= 1970 Pacific typhoon season =

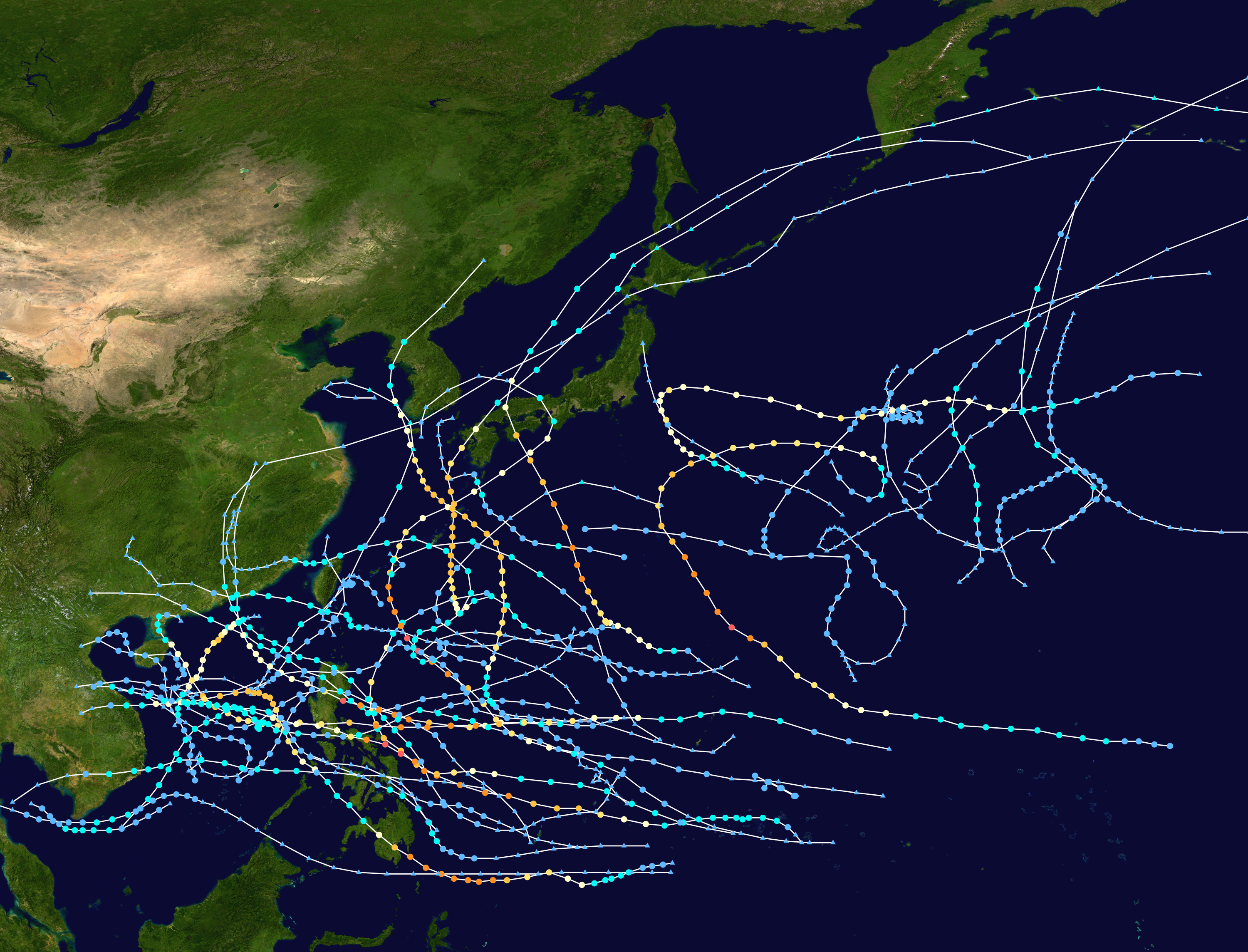
- Season summary map

Seasonal boundaries
- First system formed: January 1, 1970
- Last system dissipated: December 19, 1970

Strongest storm
- Name: Hope
  - Maximum winds: 280 km/h (175 mph) (1-minute sustained)
  - Lowest pressure: 895 hPa (mbar)

Seasonal statistics
- Total depressions: 31
- Total storms: 26
- Typhoons: 13
- Very strong typhoons: 7 (unofficial)
- Total fatalities: > 1,847
- Total damage: > $216 million (1970 USD)

Related articles
- 1970 Atlantic hurricane season; 1970 Pacific hurricane season; 1970 North Indian Ocean cyclone season

The 1970 Pacific typhoon season has no official bounds; it ran year-round in 1970, but most tropical cyclones tend to form in the northwestern Pacific Ocean between June and December. These dates conventionally delimit the period of each year when most tropical cyclones form in the northwestern Pacific Ocean.

The scope of this article is limited to the Pacific Ocean, north of the equator and west of the International Dateline. Storms that form east of the date line and north of the equator are called hurricanes; see 1970 Pacific hurricane season. Tropical Storms formed in the entire west Pacific basin were assigned a name by the Joint Typhoon Warning Center. Tropical depressions in this basin have the "W" suffix added to their number. Tropical depressions that enter or form in the Philippine area of responsibility are assigned a name by the Philippine Atmospheric, Geophysical and Astronomical Services Administration or PAGASA. This can often result in the same storm having two names.

== Seasonal summary ==
27 tropical depressions formed this year in the Western Pacific, of which 24 became tropical storms. 12 storms reached typhoon intensity, of which 7 reached super typhoon strength.

== Systems ==
=== Typhoon Nancy (Atang) ===
- Typhoon (JMA)
- Category 4 typhoon (SSHWS)
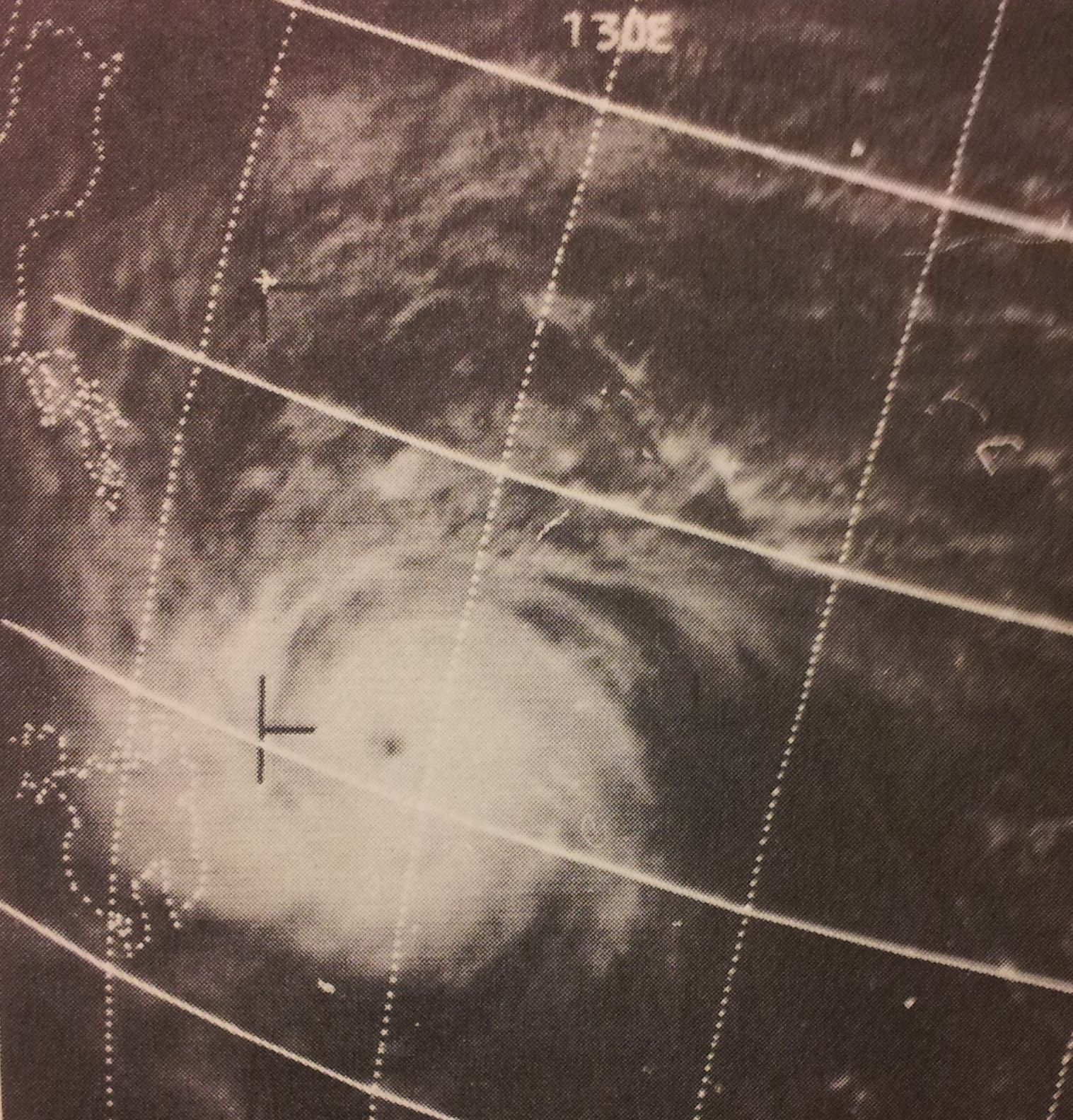
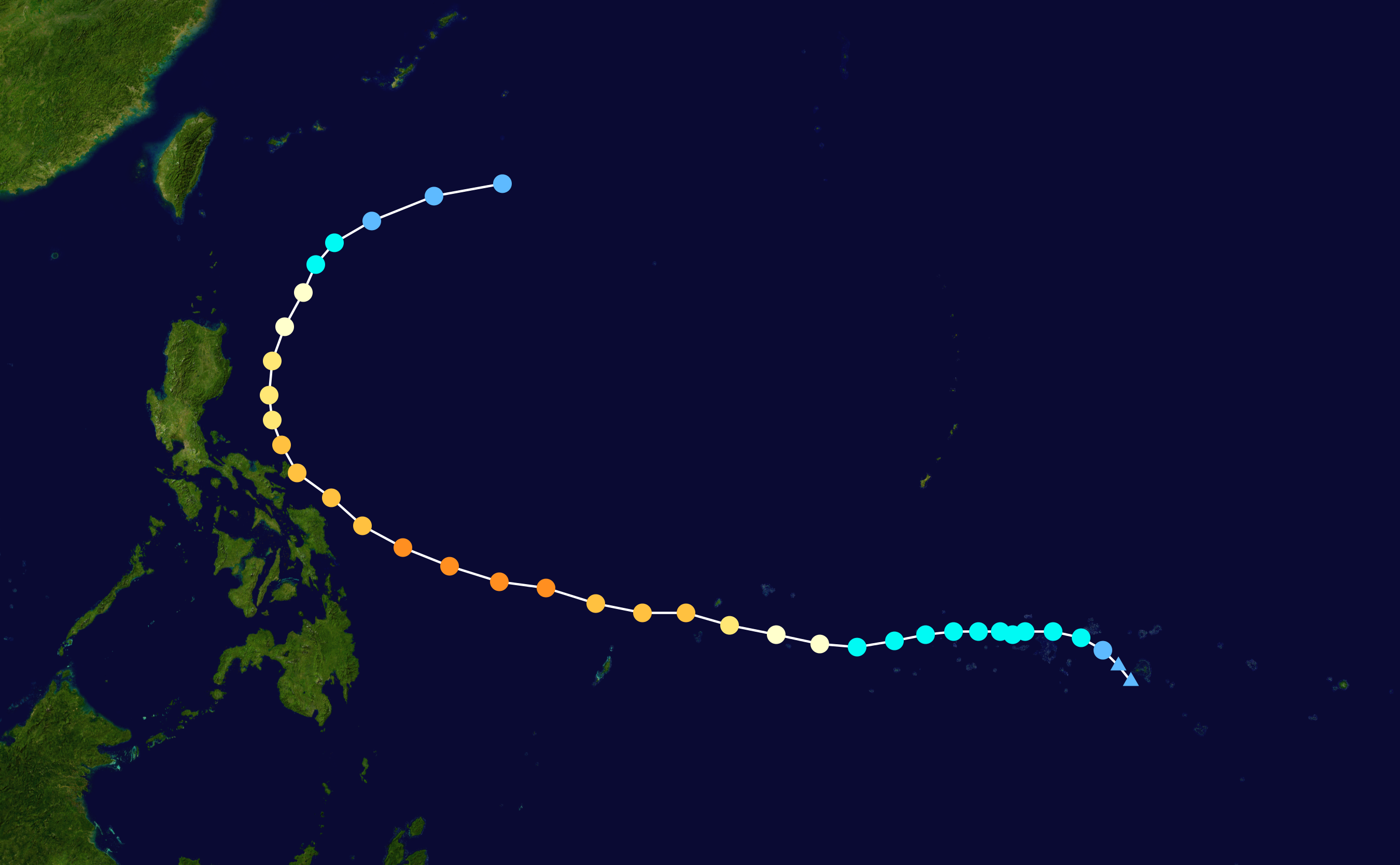
- Duration: February 19 – February 28
- Peak intensity: 220 km/h (140 mph) (1-min); 950 hPa (mbar)

Nancy originated from the interaction between an active ITCZ and a cold front near the Caroline Islands and the equator in mid February. An increase in convection was shown by weather satellites on February 18 and by the following day a recon aircraft found a weak depression to the south of the Caroline Islands. The depression moved west, suppressed south by a high pressure ridge to the north, and gradually strengthened into a tropical storm and was given the name Nancy early on February 20. Nancy became a typhoon on the 22 about 100 miles northwest from Woleai. On February 23 Nancy passed to the north of Yap where strong gale winds occurred. Continuing to encounter more favorable conditions Nancy was able to achieve a peak intensity of 140 mph (220 km/h) and a pressure of 952 hPa (28.1 inHg) on February 24. This was the equivalent of a category four hurricane. It is rare to have a typhoon of this magnitude during the month of February, as noted by the JTWC, only Irma of the 1953 season reached the same intensity at the time. As Nancy approached the Philippine Islands the typhoon traversed to the western ambit of the ridge that had kept it to the south, allowing it to move farther in a north direction. During the 25 Nancy passed east off the coast of the easternmost islands of the Philippines. On the island of Catanduanes, the edge of the eye brushed the eastern coast. A U. S. Coast Guard loran station on Catanduanes recorded intense winds, at which point the equipment malfunctioned. The storm encountered a hostile environment to the northeast of Luzon and began to weaken. By February 26 Nancy had become a tropical storm and shortly afterward had transitioned into an extra tropical cyclone and moved off into open ocean. By the 28 what remained of Nancy was a frontal trough.

Nancy caused significant damage to the Philippines and surrounding islands. Particularly hard hit were the islands of Catanduanes and Samar. Damage was estimated near a million dollars with 5,000 families homeless. On the Island of Yap heavy storm surge caused $160,000 in damages, luckily no one was killed. A 6,065 ton American ship, Antinous, encountered the full brunt of the typhoon shortly before midnight, February 24. Ship logs record sea swells of over 40 feet, winds over 100 knots, a central pressure of 953 millibars, and three of the ships large butane tanks on the main dock broke free during the storm along with a portion of its bulwark.

=== Super Typhoon Olga (Deling) ===
- Typhoon (JMA)
- Category 5 super typhoon (SSHWS)
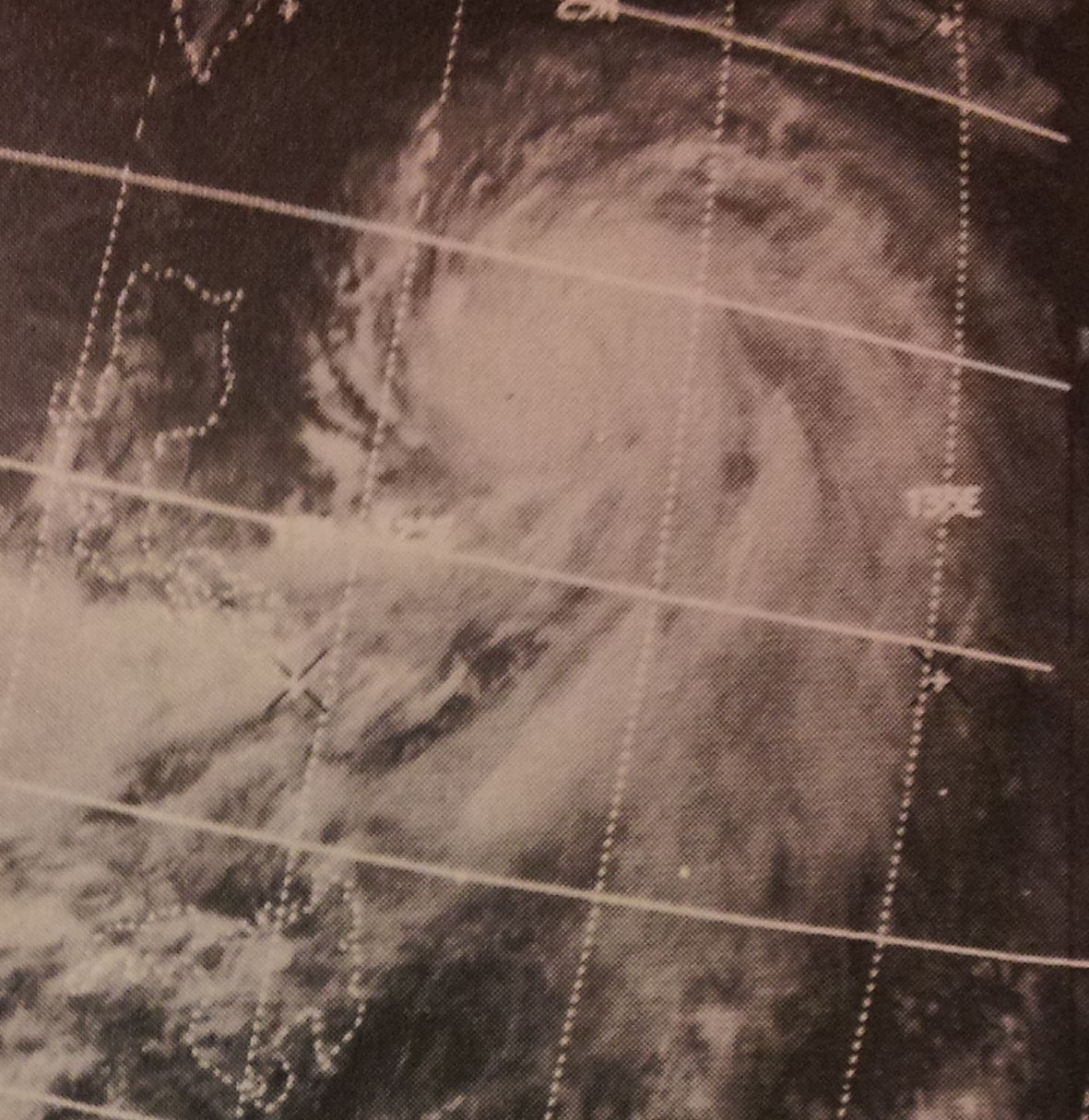
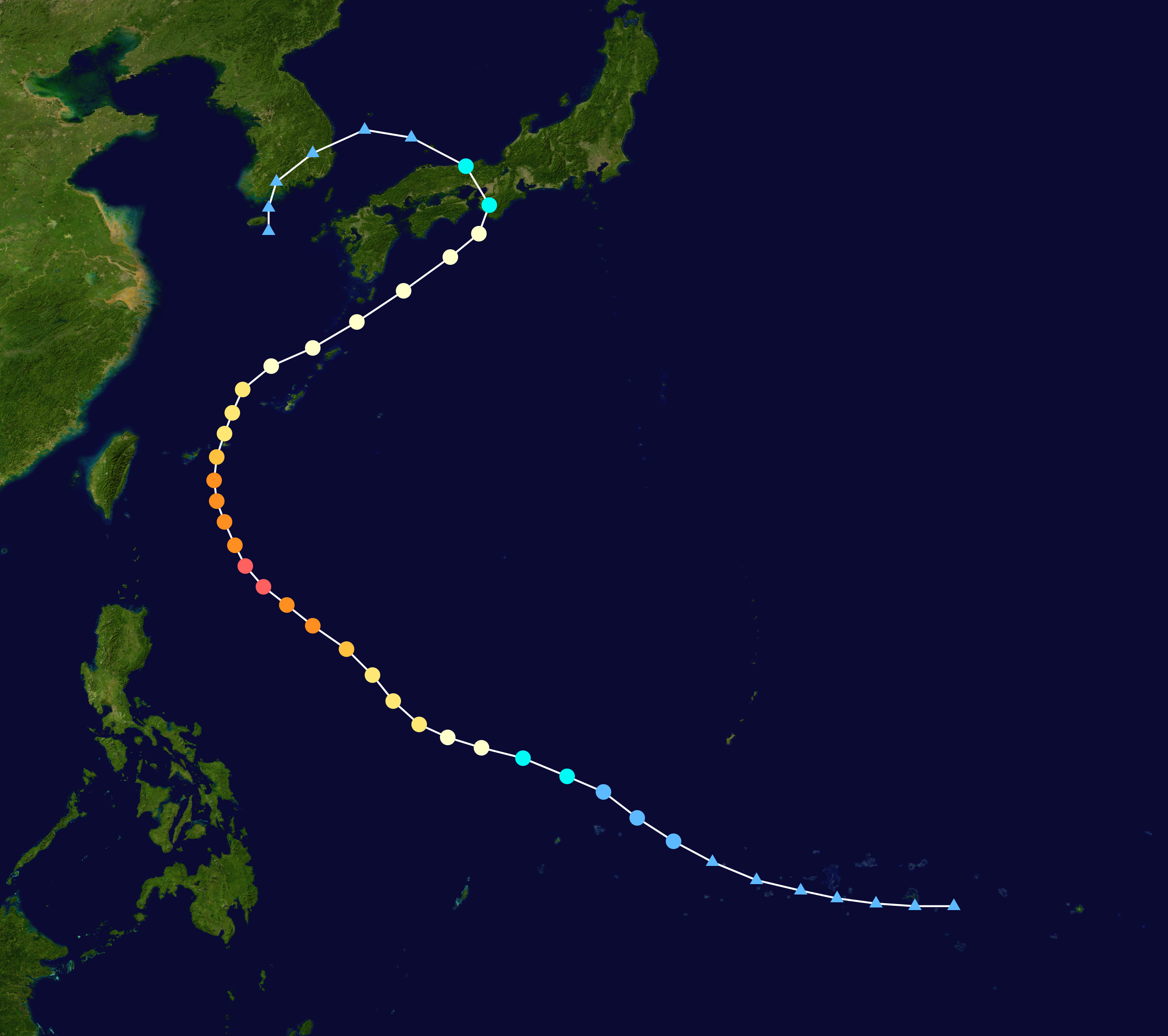
- Duration: June 27 – July 5
- Peak intensity: 260 km/h (160 mph) (1-min); 905 hPa (mbar)

In mid-June a change in the jet stream over a large part of the Pacific Ocean caused an increase in tropical wave frequency; one becoming the precursor to Olga. The wave was first noticed near the Marshall Islands, particularly the Island of Majuro on June 24. As it moved west weather satellites depicted the wave had begun to organize with considerable convection and spiraling storm bands as it neared the Central Caroline Islands. Due to the waves close proximity to a high pressure area to the north, strong easterlies accelerated it to the west. The increased forward speed inhibited the establishment of a circulation until it was south of Guam early on June 29. Later that day reconnaissance found a closed center and gale-force winds, prompting the JTWC to upgrade the low into a tropical storm and was given the name Olga. As it entered the Philippine Sea the ridge that had kept it to the south began to weaken allowing Olga to move in a northwestward direction. As Olga entered an increasingly favorable environment, the storm slowed its forward speed and strengthened into a typhoon late on June 29. Rapid intensification followed as the system bottomed out at a pressure of 904 hPa (26.7 inHg) and winds of 160 mph (260 km/h) on July 1. The rapid 62 millibar drop between June 30 and July 1 caused an intense wind profile surrounding the small eye. The storm followed a break in the ridge and moved north while gradually weakening. As Olga was passing to the east of Taiwan a short wave from the China mainland gave an eastward component to the storm's motion. A low developed following the short wave and began to influence Olga, causing the typhoon to weaken. Dry air soon entered the circulation, reducing the systems overall convection. During July 5 Olga made landfall on the Kansai region of Japan, south of Osaka, as a tropical storm. The system continued into the Sea of Japan, and merged with a cold front. The remaining low tracked over South Korea before completely dissipating on July 7.

Olga was a very intense typhoon, causing an estimated ten million dollars to Japan alone. While passing through the Ryukyu Islands wind measurements were as high as 130 mph (205 km/h) on July 4. Heavy rains occurred over Japan, up to 14 inches in some areas, caused landslides and extensive flooding; killing 20. In South Korea 29 deaths were caused by the heavy rainfall associated with Olga's remnants.

=== Tropical Storm Pamela (Klaring) ===
- Severe tropical storm (JMA)
- Tropical storm (SSHWS)
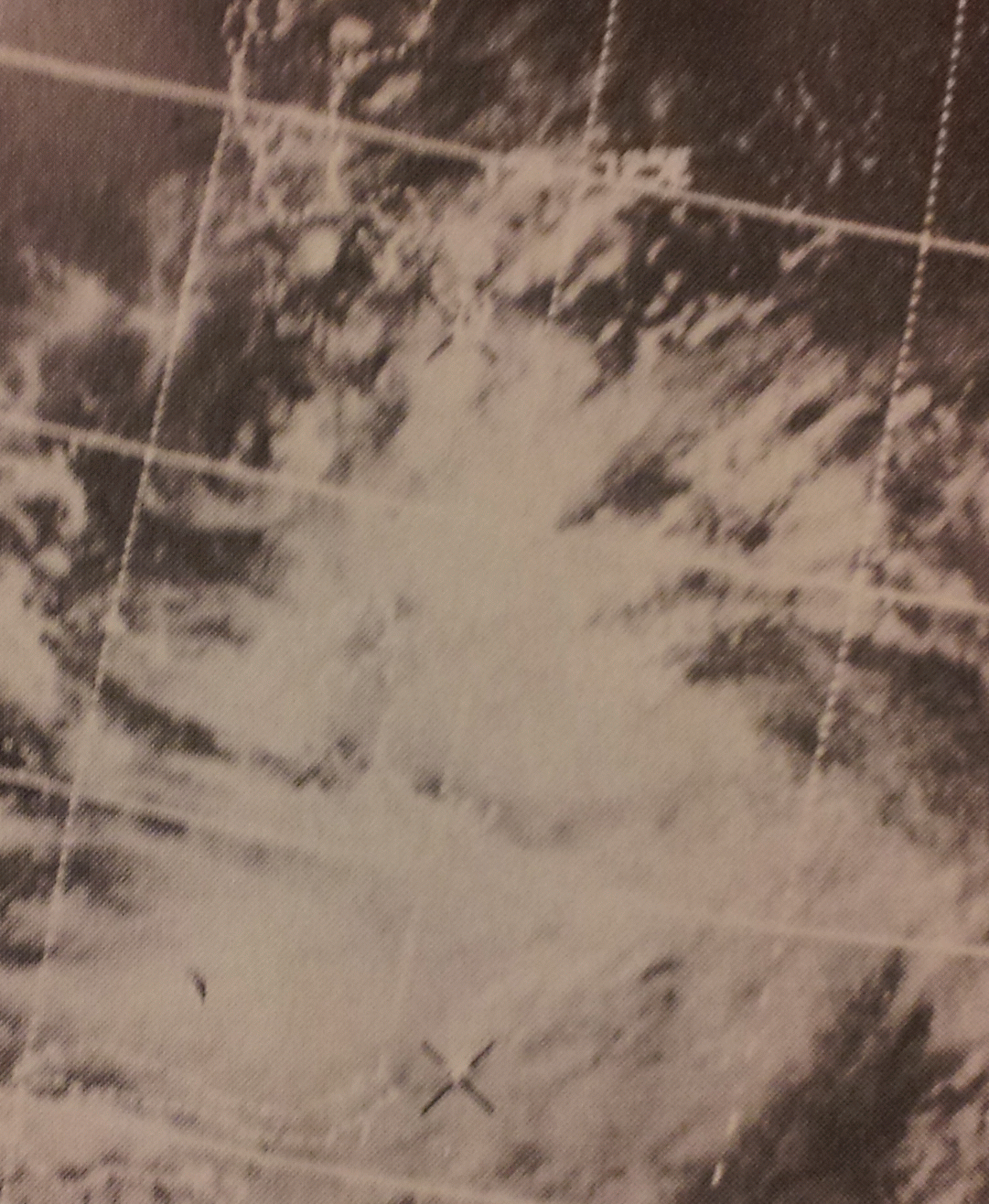
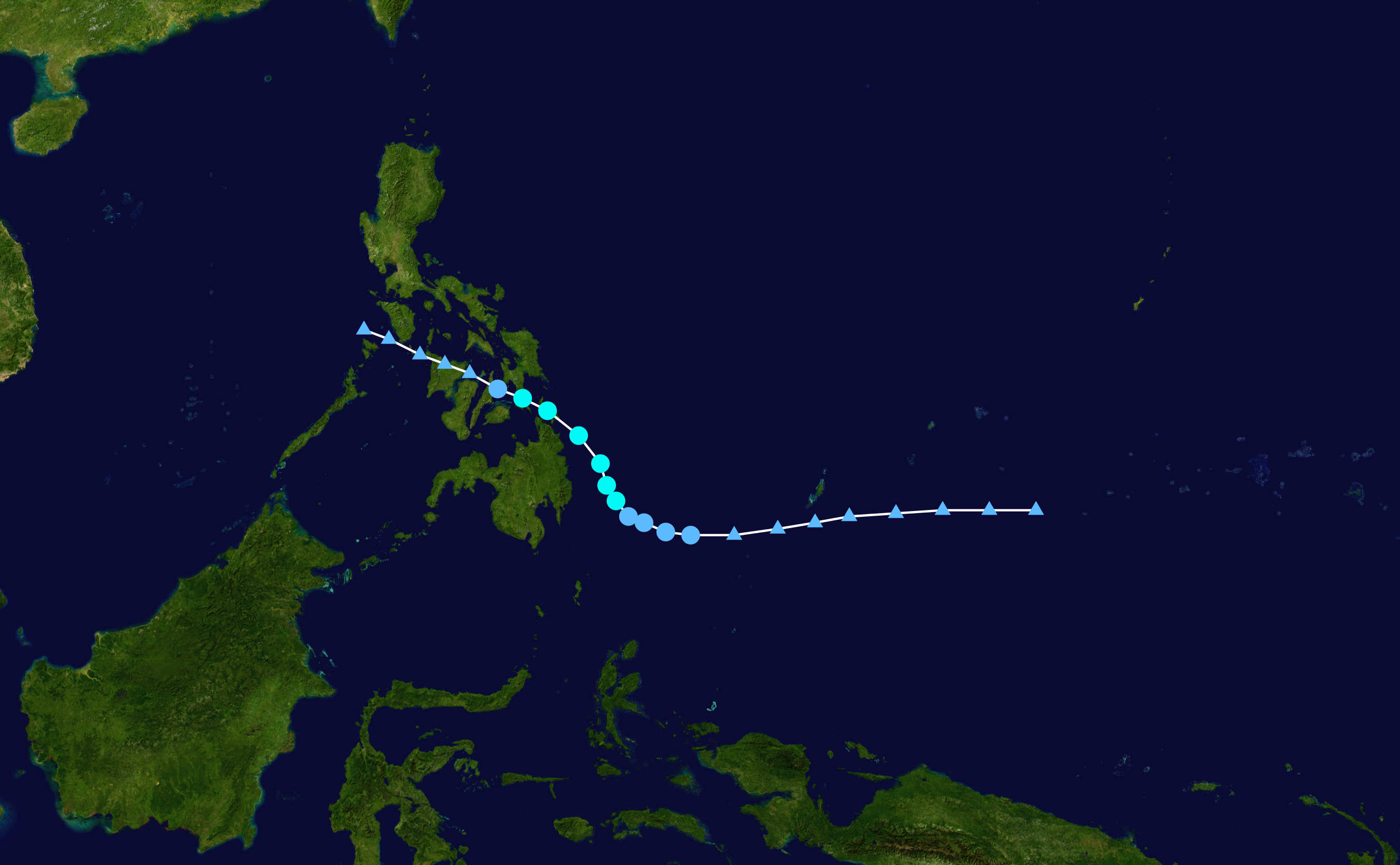
- Duration: June 28 – July 1
- Peak intensity: 95 km/h (60 mph) (1-min); 980 hPa (mbar)

Forming on June 28, Pamela slowly travelled towards the Philippines, and made landfall late on June 30. The tropical storm brought rains and winds to the Philippines, but no major damage was reported. Having greatly weakened after landfall, Pamela degenerated into a remnant low and dissipated over the South China Sea on July 1, just as Category 5 Super Typhoon Olga reached its peak.

=== Tropical Storm Ruby (Emang) ===
- Severe tropical storm (JMA)
- Tropical storm (SSHWS)
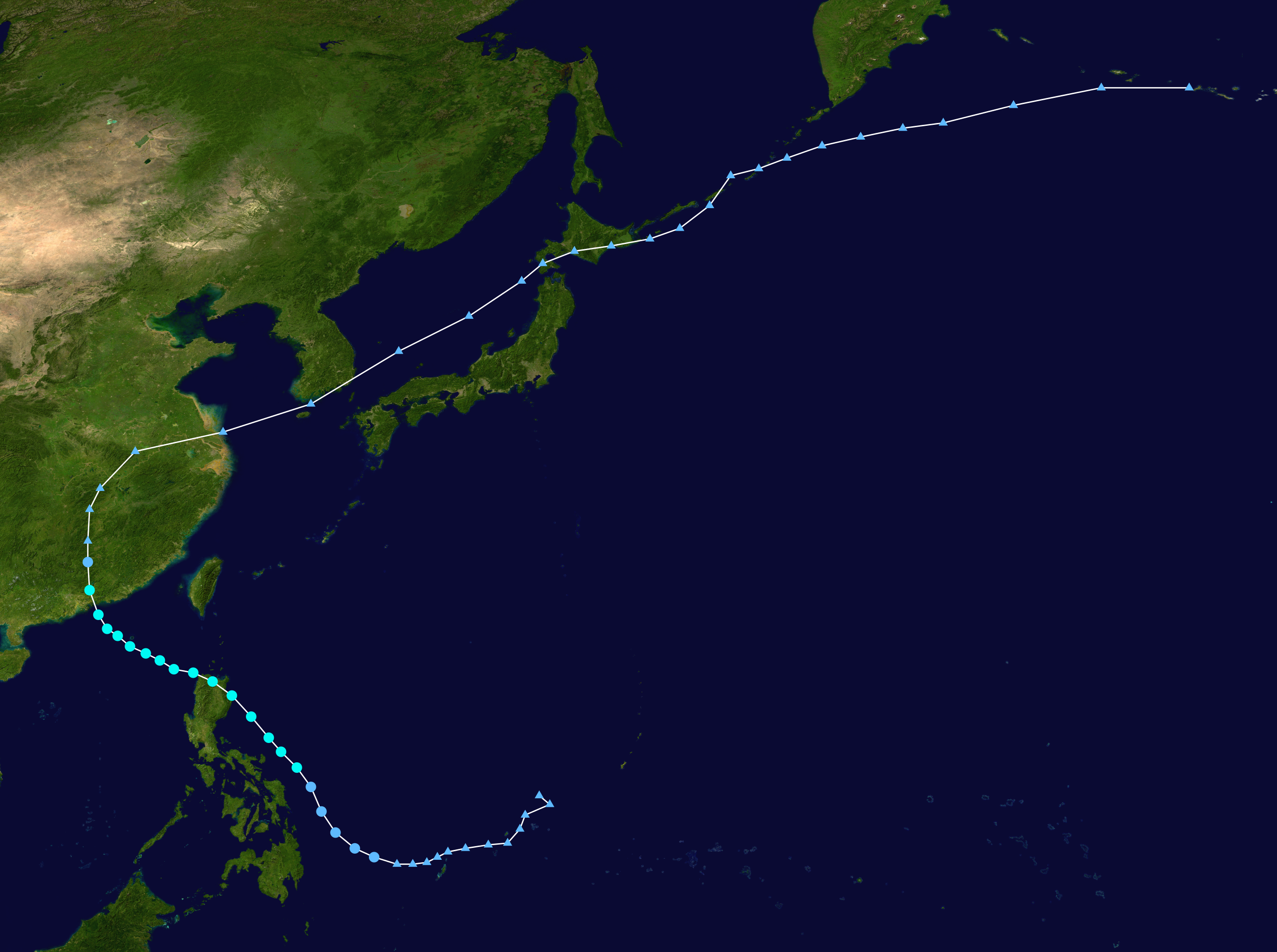
- Duration: July 11 – July 17
- Peak intensity: 100 km/h (65 mph) (1-min); 985 hPa (mbar)

Tropical Storm Ruby formed as a disturbance east of the Philippines. It slowly traveled west-southwest, becoming a tropical storm on the 12th. It crossed the northern part of Luzon before making landfall in China on the 15th. The storm became extratropical over China, and proceeded northwest, crossing Hokkaido before dissipating over the Aleutian Islands.

=== Tropical Storm Sally ===
- Tropical storm (JMA)
- Tropical storm (SSHWS)
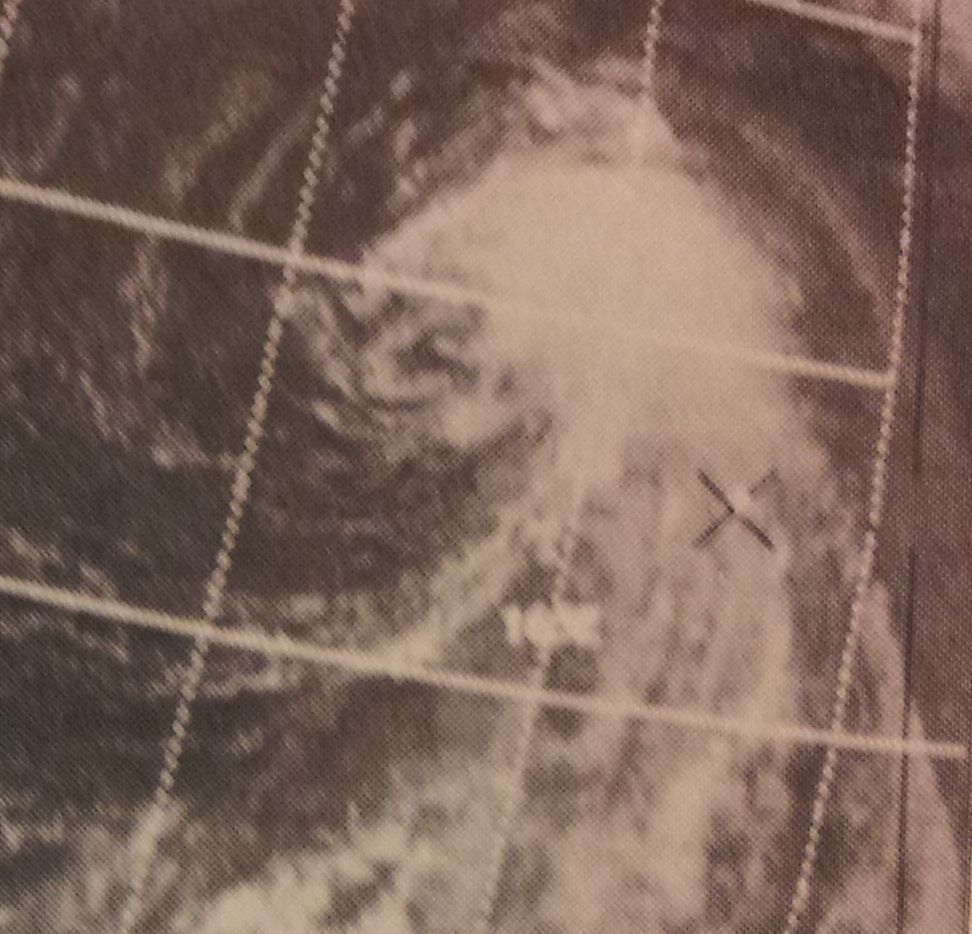
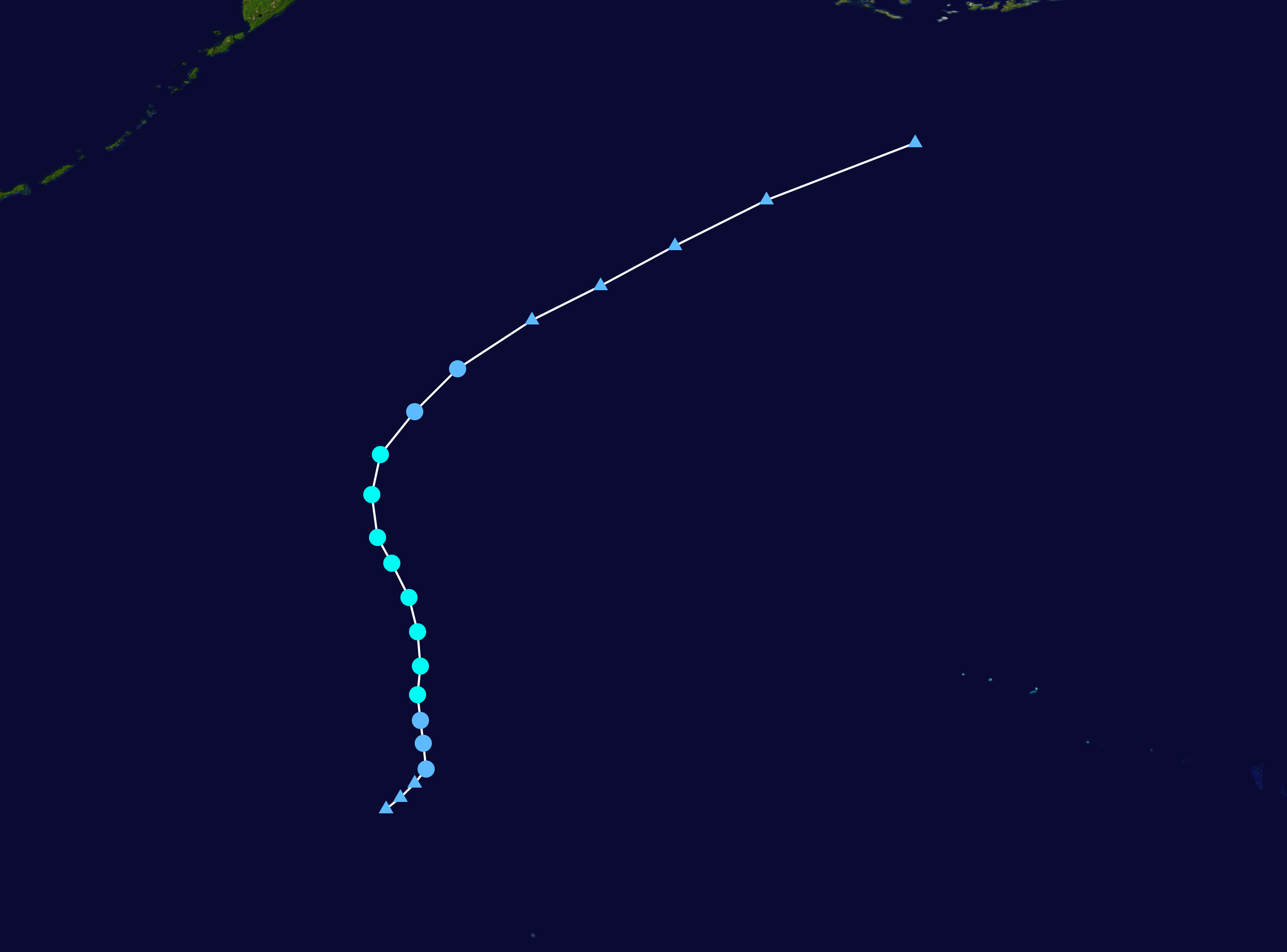
- Duration: July 19 – July 23
- Peak intensity: 75 km/h (45 mph) (1-min); 992 hPa (mbar)

Tropical Storm Sally was a tropical cyclone that formed in the Western Pacific Ocean during the 1970 Pacific typhoon season . It developed from a tropical disturbance on July 19 and gradually intensified into a tropical storm. It became a tropical storm on the 21st, then became extratropical on the 22nd Sally moved generally westward, remaining at sea throughout its lifespan. The storm reached its peak intensity as a tropical storm with maximum sustained winds of 75 kilometers per hour (45 miles per hour). Sally eventually weakened and dissipated on July 23. Due to its offshore track, Tropical Storm Sally did not cause any significant impact on land. The storm primarily affected open waters, generating rough seas and strong winds in the vicinity of its path.

=== Tropical Storm 07W (Gading) ===
- Tropical depression (JMA)
- Tropical storm (SSHWS)
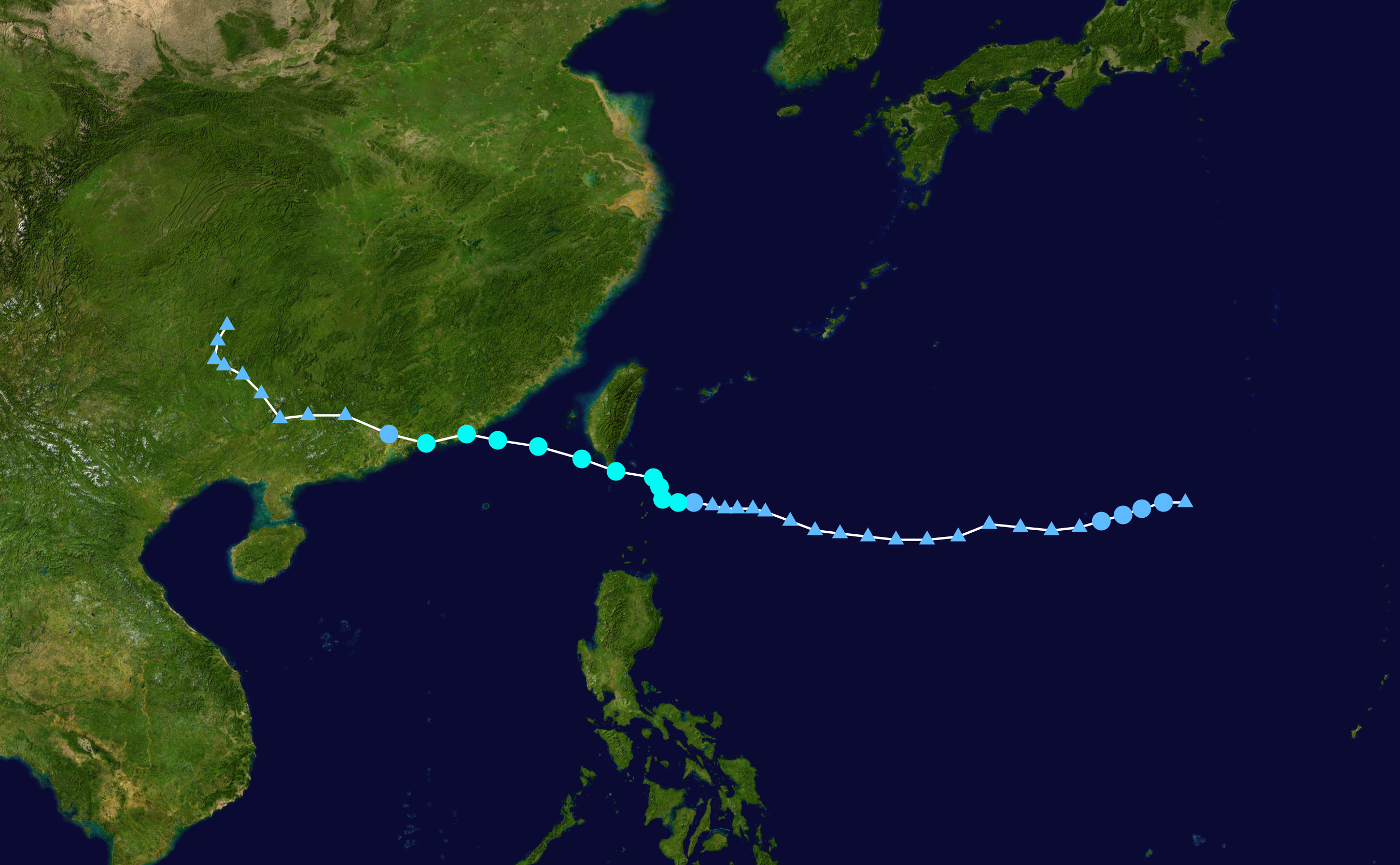
- Duration: July 25 – August 2
- Peak intensity: 85 km/h (50 mph) (1-min); 994 hPa (mbar)

Tropical Storm 07W, also known in the Philippines as Gading, was a tropical cyclone that formed in the Western Pacific Ocean during the 1970 Pacific typhoon season. It originated from a tropical depression that developed on July 25. The system gradually organized and intensified, reaching tropical storm strength. 07W generally moved westward, passing the Philippine Area of Responsibility (PAR), bringing rainfall in Taiwan, and hitting Eastern China. The storm maintained its intensity for a short period before weakening and dissipating on August 2. Due to its relatively weak intensity and offshore track, 07W did not cause any significant impact on land areas but still bringing rainfall. The storm primarily affected open waters, generating rough seas and gusty winds in the vicinity of its path.

=== Tropical Storm 06W ===
- Tropical storm (JMA)
- Tropical storm (SSHWS)
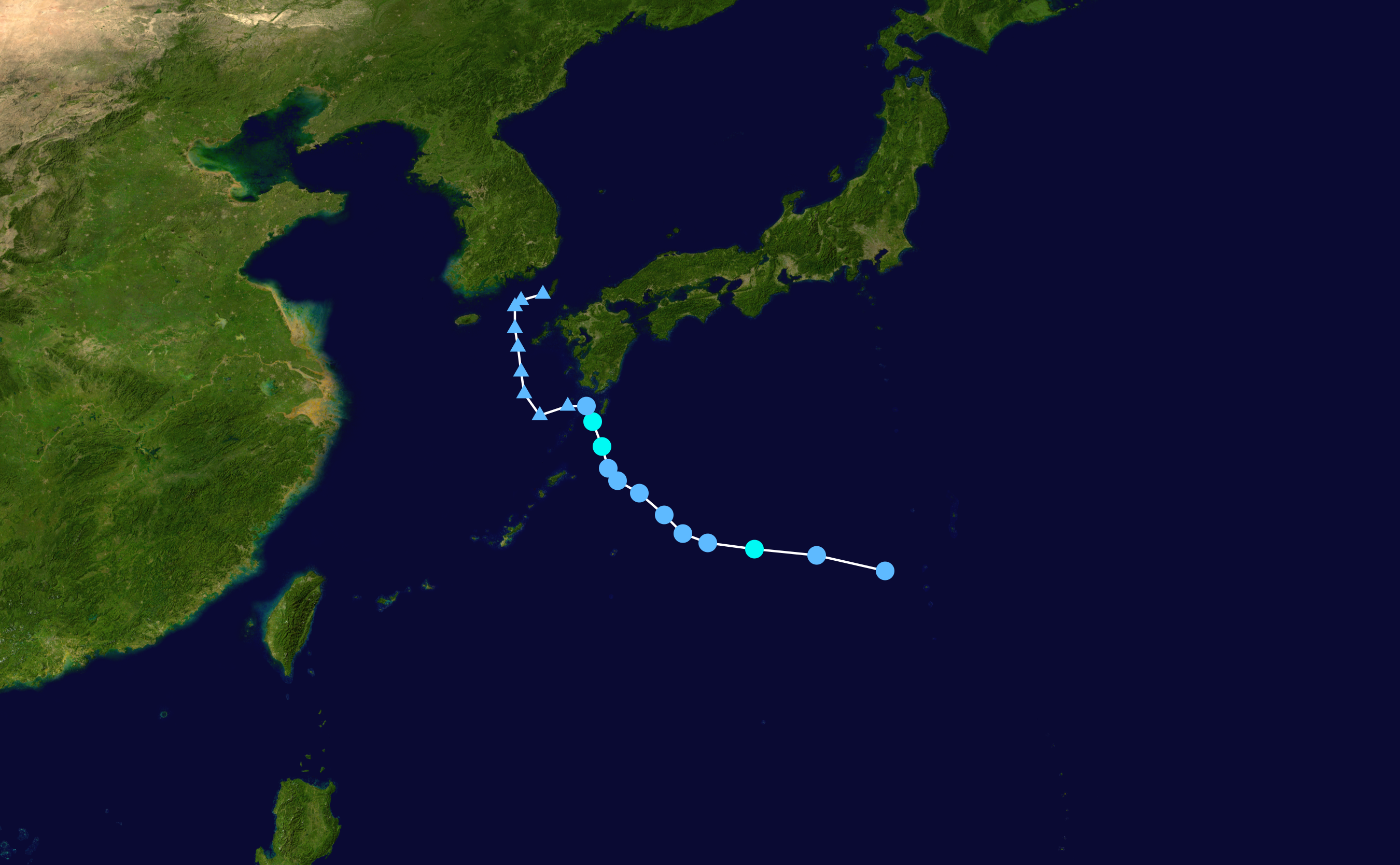
- Duration: July 28 – August 1
- Peak intensity: 75 km/h (45 mph) (1-min); 994 hPa (mbar)

Tropical Storm 06W was a short-lived tropical storm that moved westward through the Philippine Sea before dissipating over the South China Sea on August 1. Due to its offshore path and relatively weak intensity, it did not cause significant impacts to land.

=== Tropical Storm Therese ===
- Tropical storm (JMA)
- Tropical storm (SSHWS)
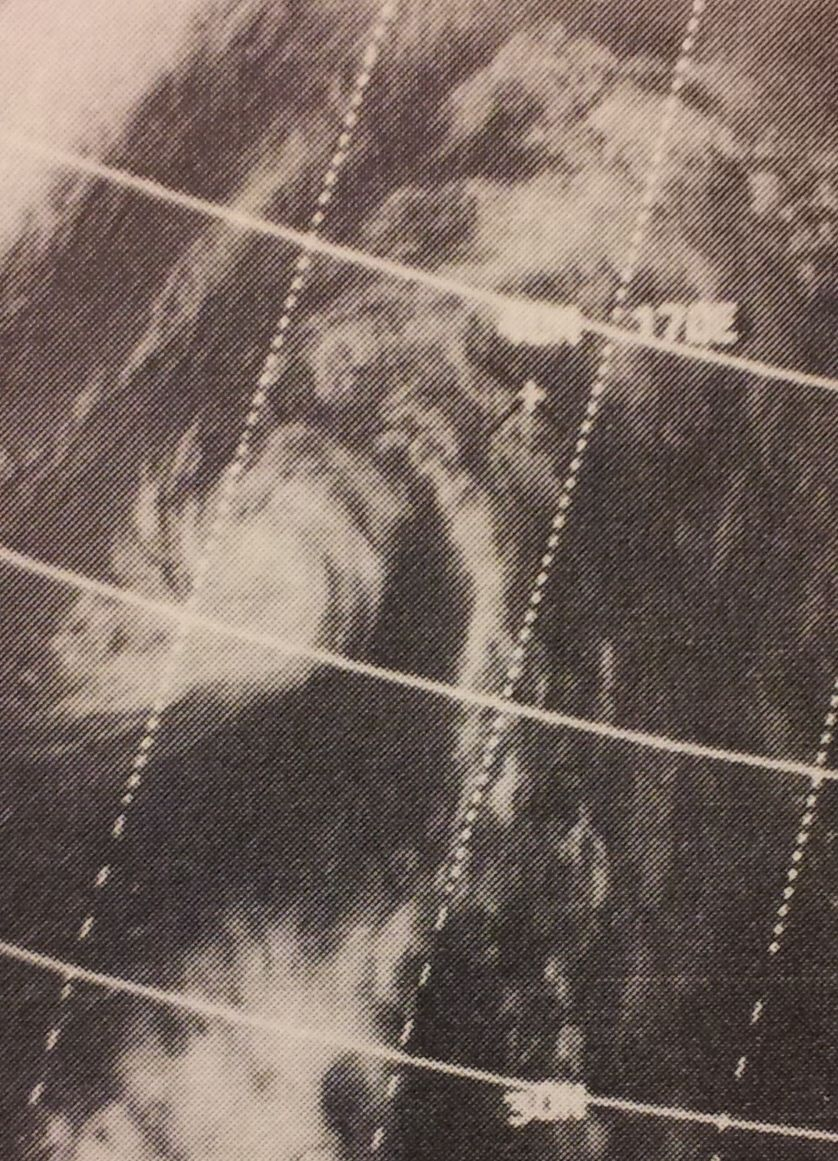
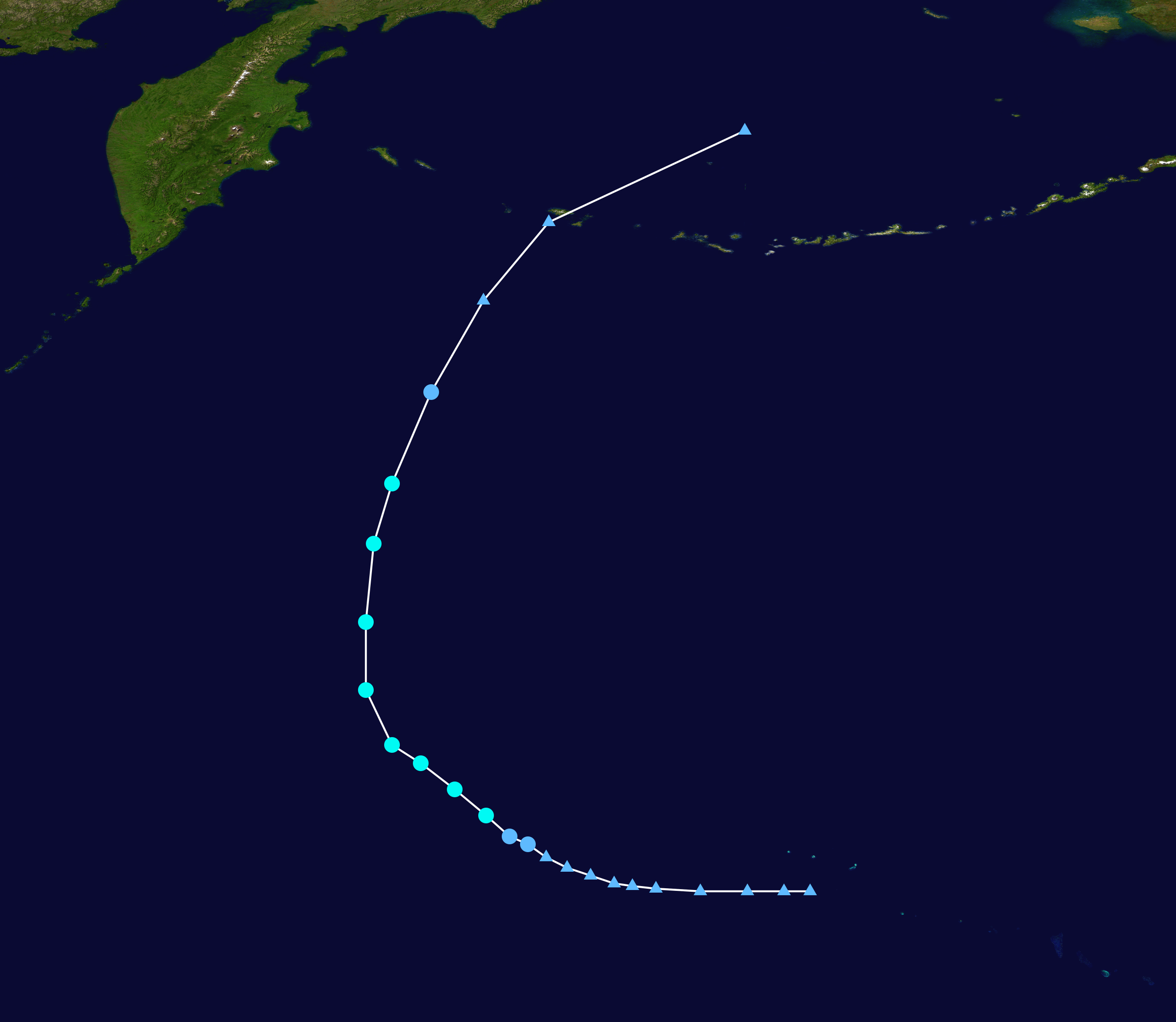
- Duration: August 1 – August 4
- Peak intensity: 75 km/h (45 mph) (1-min); 990 hPa (mbar)

Tropical Storm Therese remained far at sea during its life. It formed as a disturbance on the July 30, then turned northwestward and became a tropical storm, before undergoing extratropical transition and dissipating over the Bering Sea.

=== Tropical Storm Violet (Heling) ===
- Tropical storm (JMA)
- Tropical storm (SSHWS)
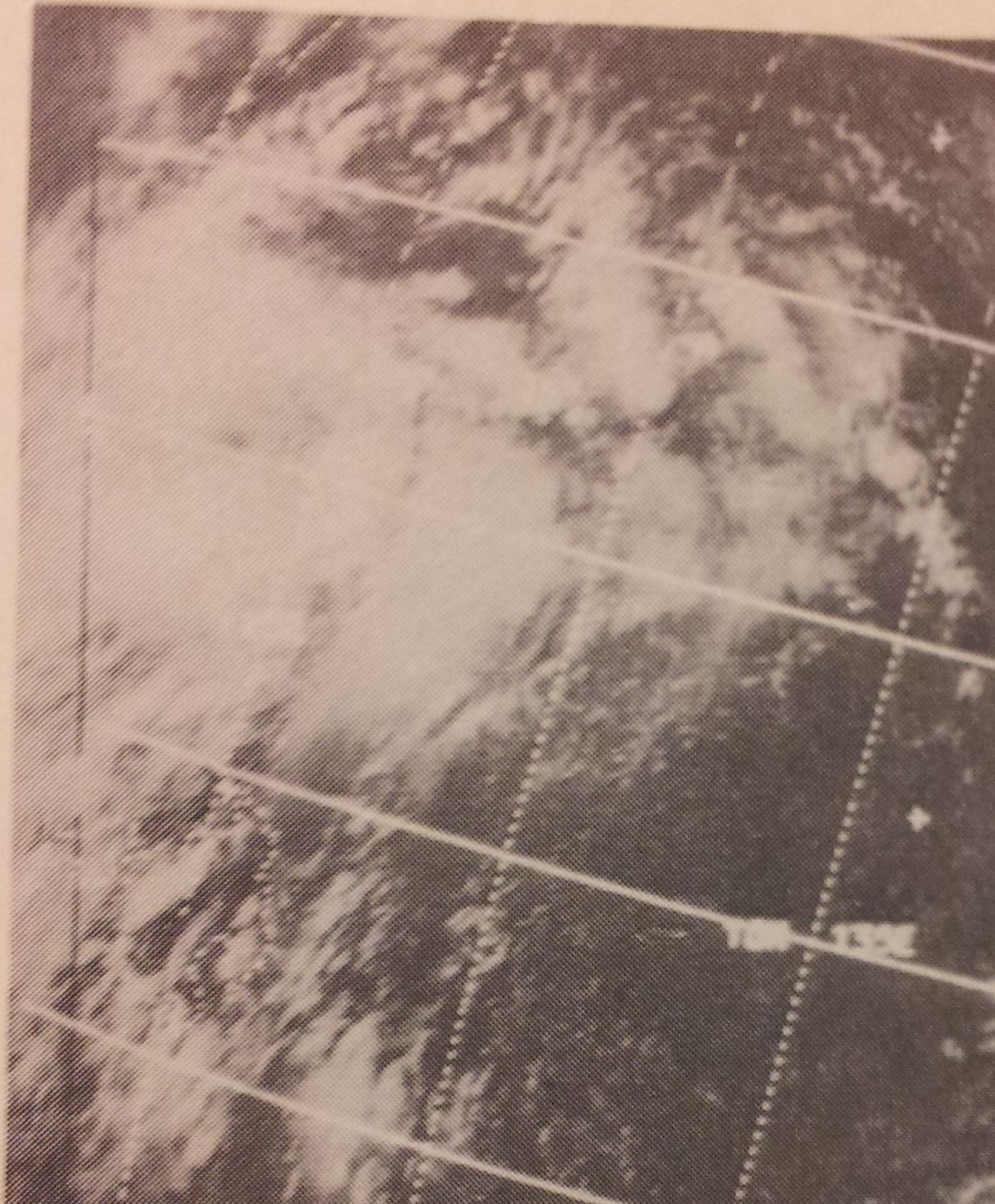
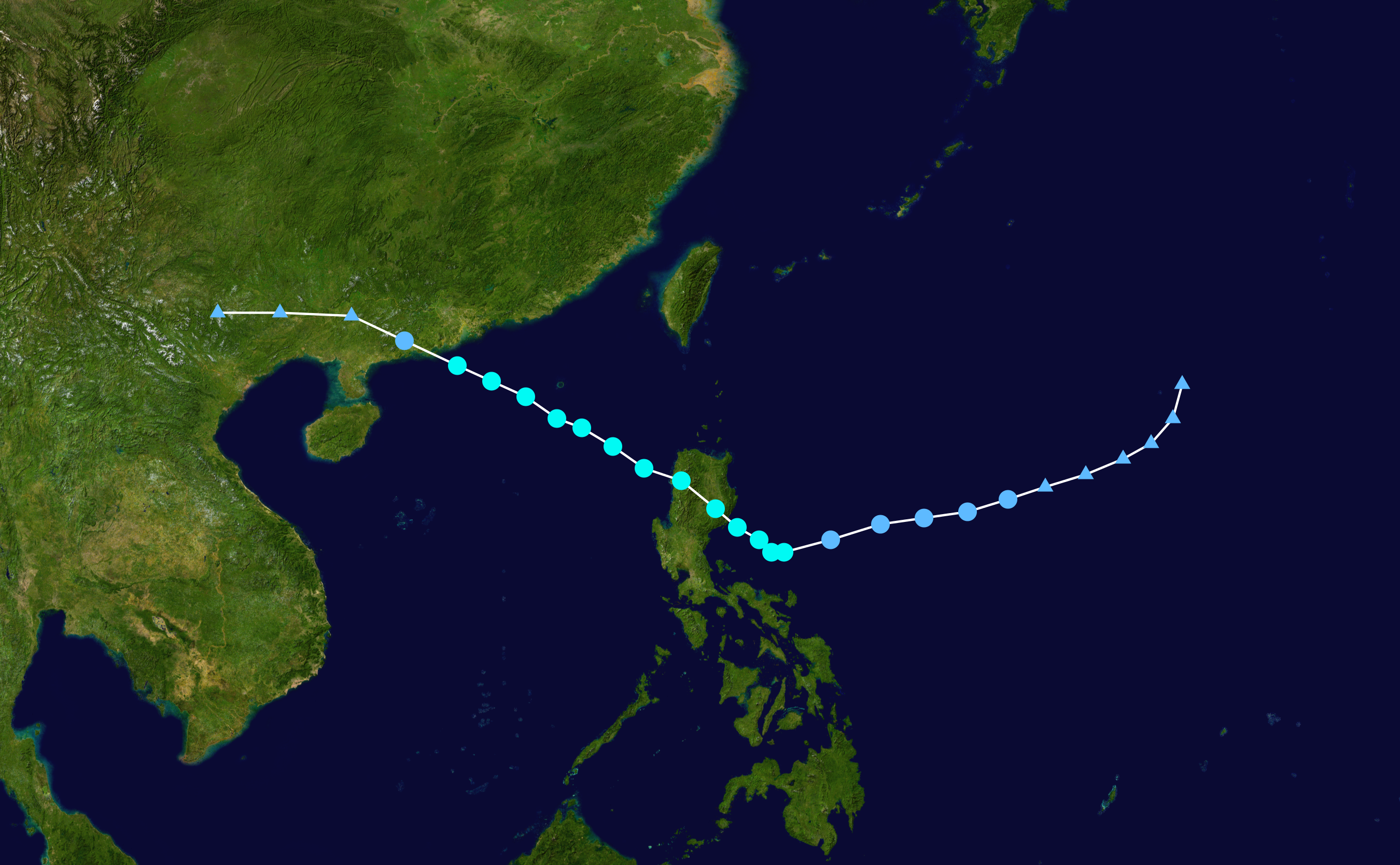
- Duration: August 3 – August 9
- Peak intensity: 75 km/h (45 mph) (1-min); 992 hPa (mbar)

Tropical Storm Violet formed east of the Philippines, then traveled westward, becoming a tropical storm before making landfall on Luzon. Violet then crossed the South China Sea before making landfall in China as a weak tropical storm. It dissipated over China shortly after.

=== Typhoon Wilda (Iliang) ===
- Typhoon (JMA)
- Category 3 typhoon (SSHWS)
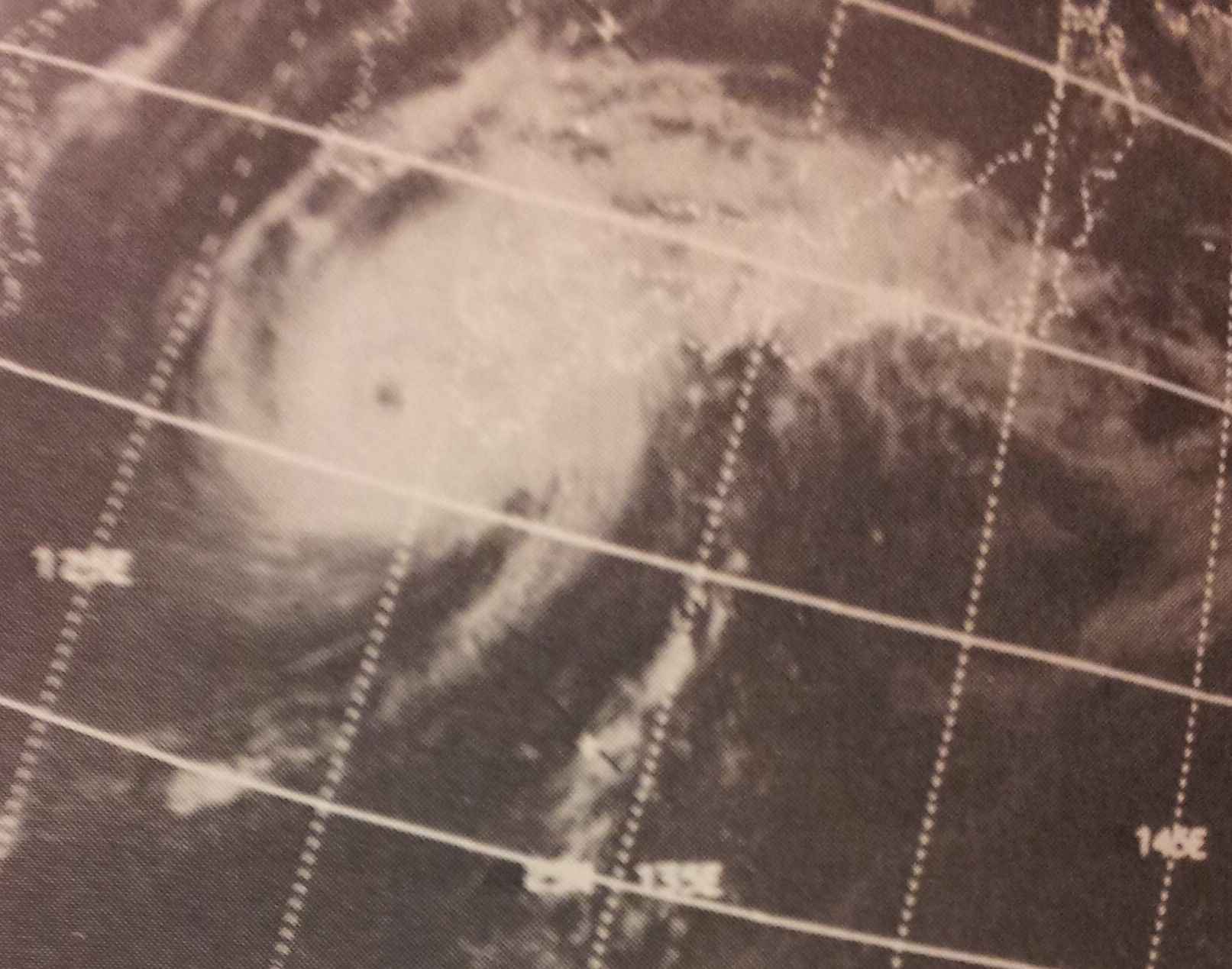
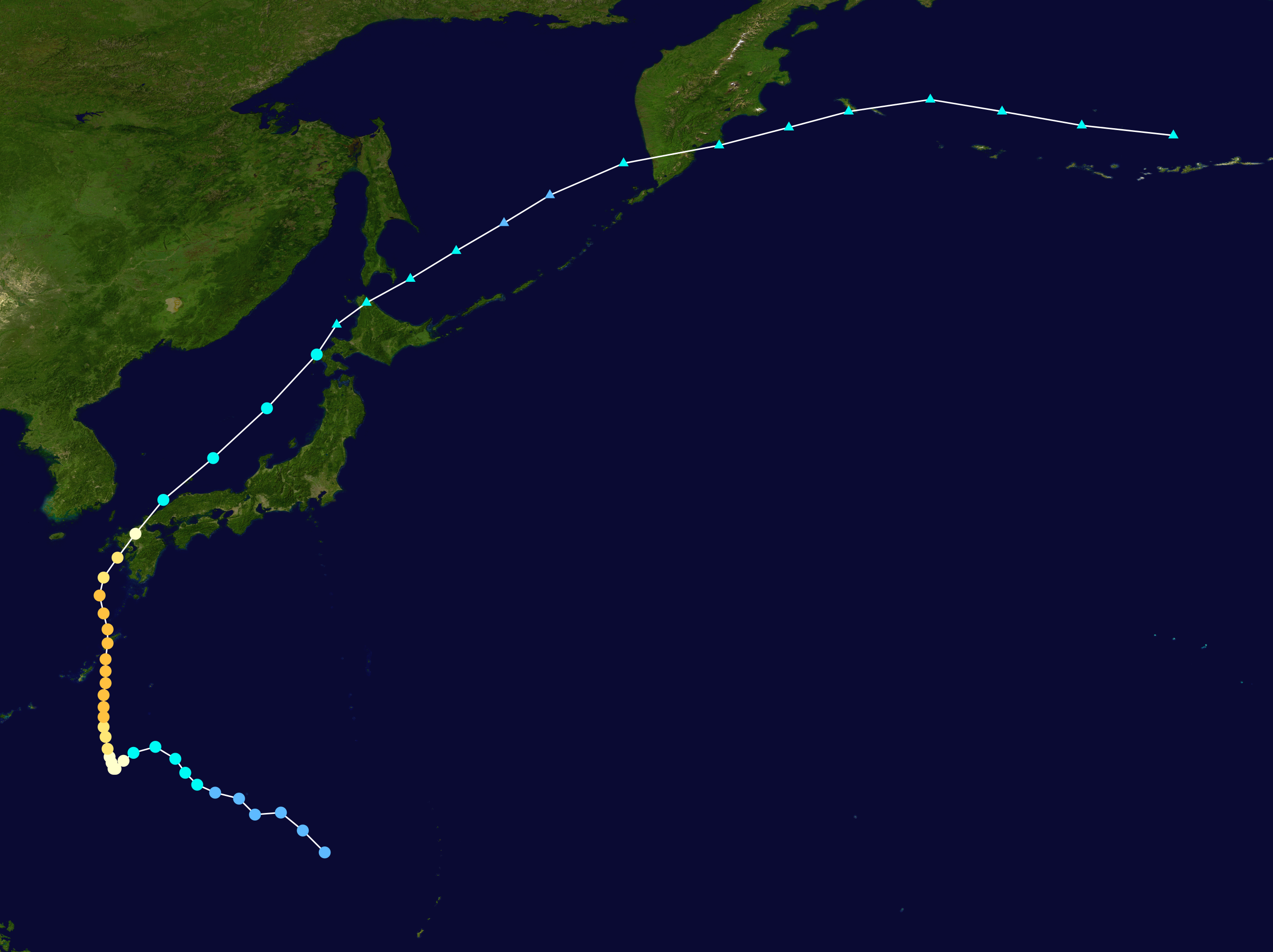
- Duration: August 9 – August 15
- Peak intensity: 195 km/h (120 mph) (1-min); 940 hPa (mbar)

A broad surface trough developed into Tropical Storm Wilda on August 9. After drifting to the west-southwest, it turned to the north, where it reached a peak of 120 mph winds on the 12th near Okinawa. Wilda continued northward, and weakened slightly to a 105 mph typhoon before making landfall on western Kyūshū on the 14th. Wilda accelerated to the northeast, and became extratropical on the 15th. The typhoon caused heavy rain, killing 11 people.

=== Super Typhoon Anita ===
- Typhoon (JMA)
- Category 4 super typhoon (SSHWS)
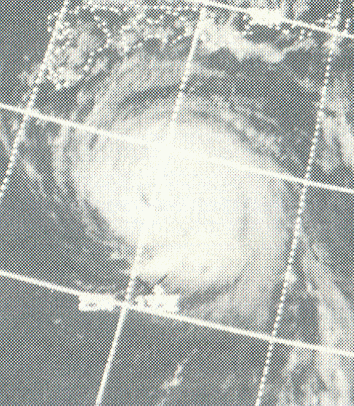
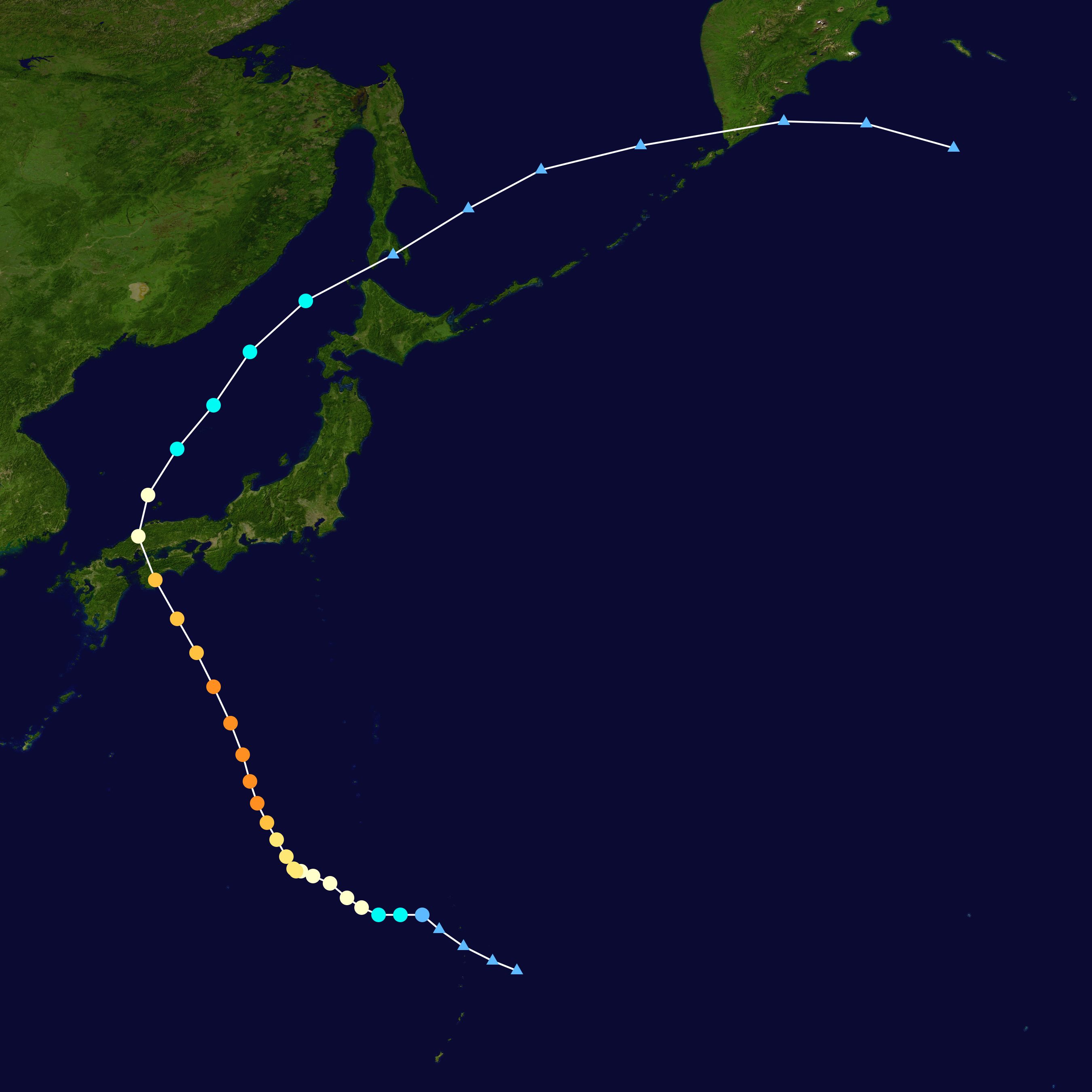
- Duration: August 15 – August 22
- Peak intensity: 250 km/h (155 mph) (1-min); 910 hPa (mbar)

An upper-level low contributed to the formation of Tropical Depression 11W on August 16 over the northern Marianas Islands. It quickly intensified, reaching typhoon status that night. Anita's intensification rate slowed initially, but as it continued northwestward late on the 18th and 19th, Anita rapidly strengthened to a 155 mph super typhoon. It weakened as it accelerated to the north-northwest, and hit western Shikoku in Japan on the 21st as a 115 mph typhoon. Anita, which became extratropical on the 22nd, caused 23 deaths and sank 31 vessels.

=== Typhoon Billie (Loleng) ===
- Typhoon (JMA)
- Category 3 typhoon (SSHWS)
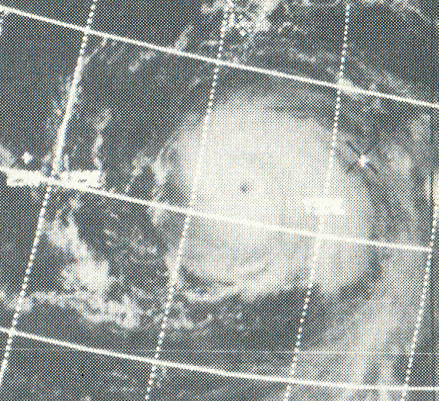
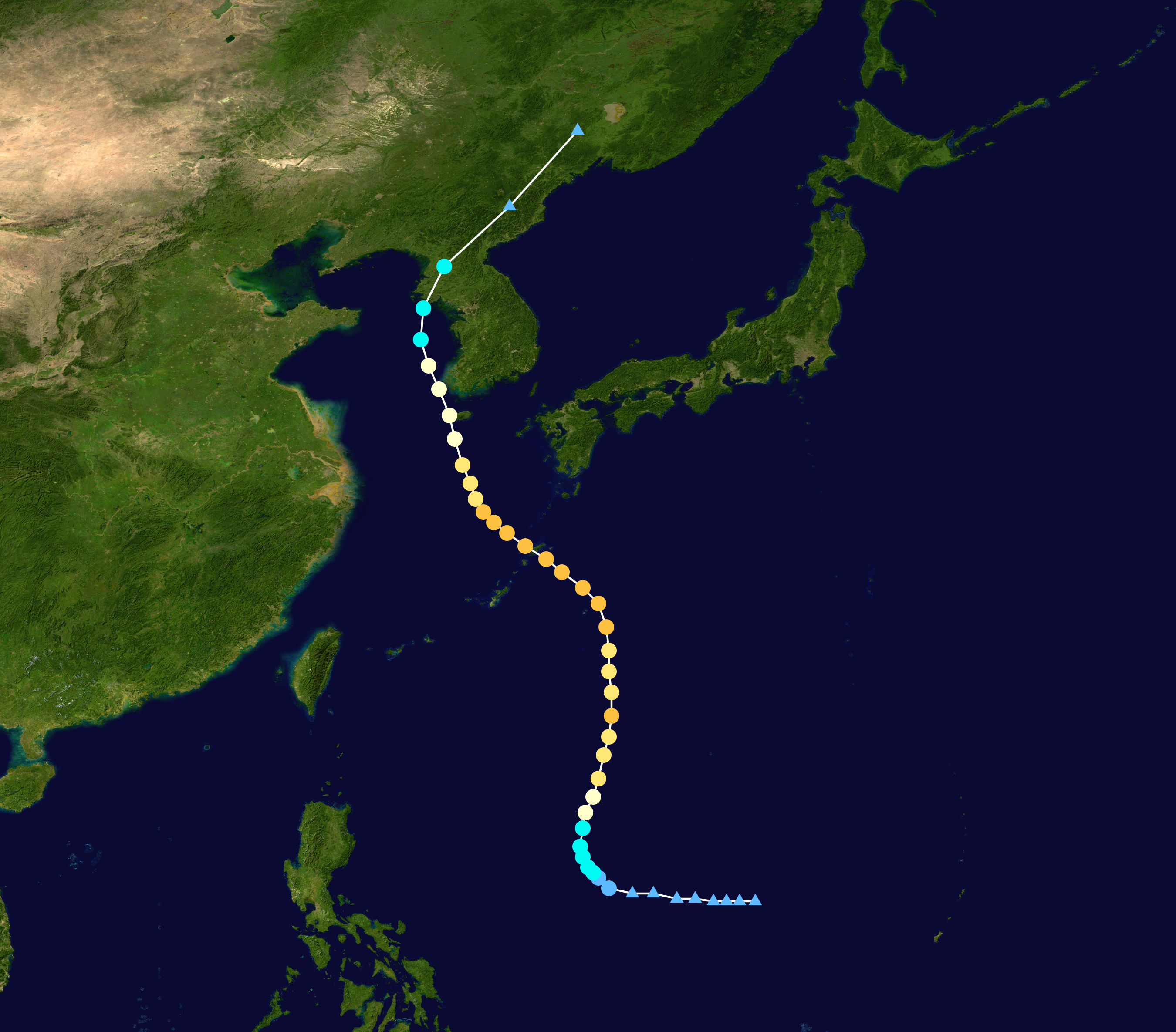
- Duration: August 21 – August 31
- Peak intensity: 205 km/h (125 mph) (1-min); 945 hPa (mbar)

Typhoon Billie formed in the Philippine Sea as a weak depression. It intensified while heading northwards, becoming a tropical storm on the 23rd, a typhoon on the 25th, and reaching its maximum intensity of 110-knot winds and a 945-millibar central pressure as it passed the Ryukyu Islands on the 27th. The storm brushed South Korea as a category-1-equivalent typhoon on the 29th before making landfall in North Korea on the 30th. The remnants of Billie dissipated over the Sino-Soviet border shortly after.

=== Typhoon Clara ===
- Typhoon (JMA)
- Category 2 typhoon (SSHWS)
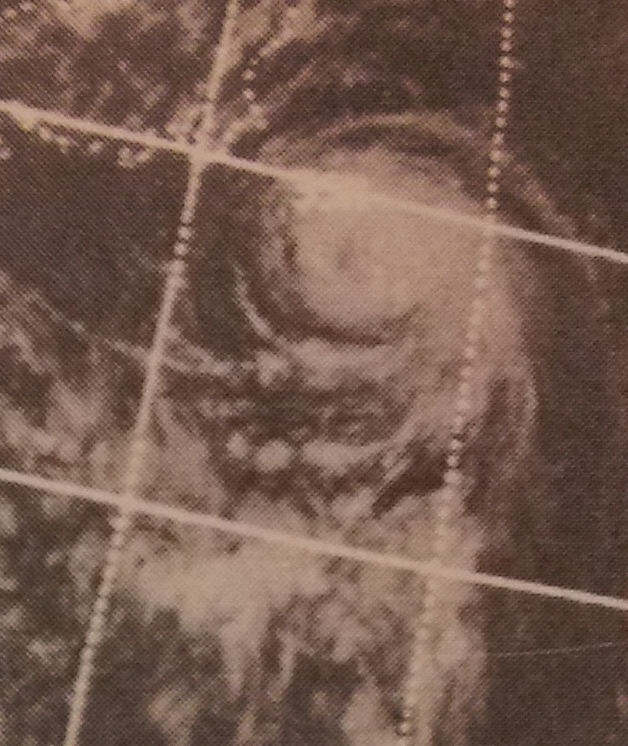
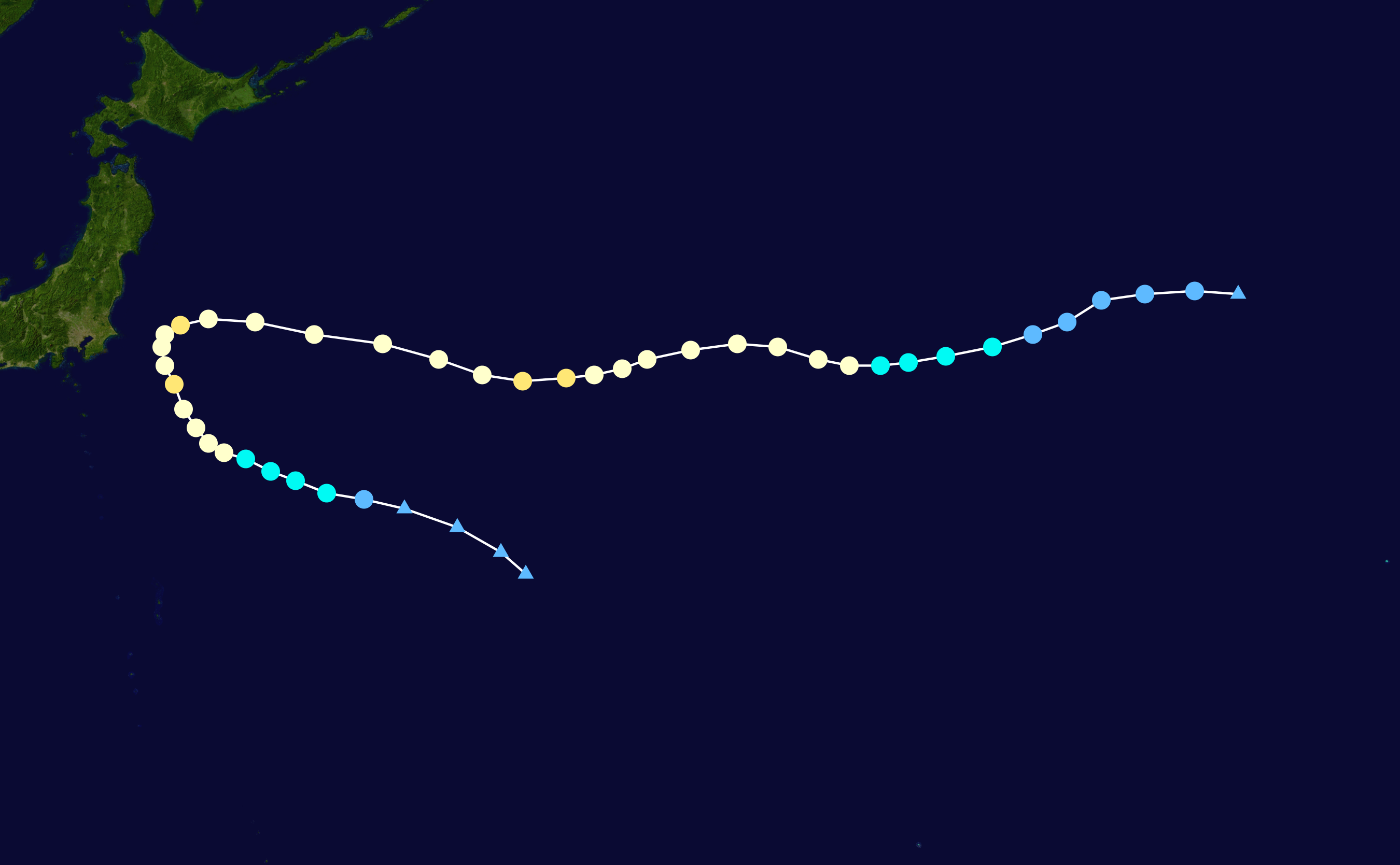
- Duration: August 25 – September 4
- Peak intensity: 155 km/h (100 mph) (1-min); 960 hPa (mbar)

Tropical Storm Clara developed on August 26 southeast of Japan from an upper tropospheric circulation that separated from the Mid-Pacific trough. It quickly strengthened, and became a typhoon on the 27th at 31.9º North, one of only 16 Western Pacific typhoons to reach that strength north of 30ºN. Clara peaked at 95 mph before coming close to Japan, when a shortwave trough forced it sharply eastward. The storm maintained its intensity until becoming extratropical on September 3. An interesting fact about Clara was a reconnaissance mission flown into Hurricane Dot in the central Pacific also flew into Clara on the same flight, an unusual accomplishment not normally seen.

=== Tropical Depression Miding ===
- Tropical depression (JMA)
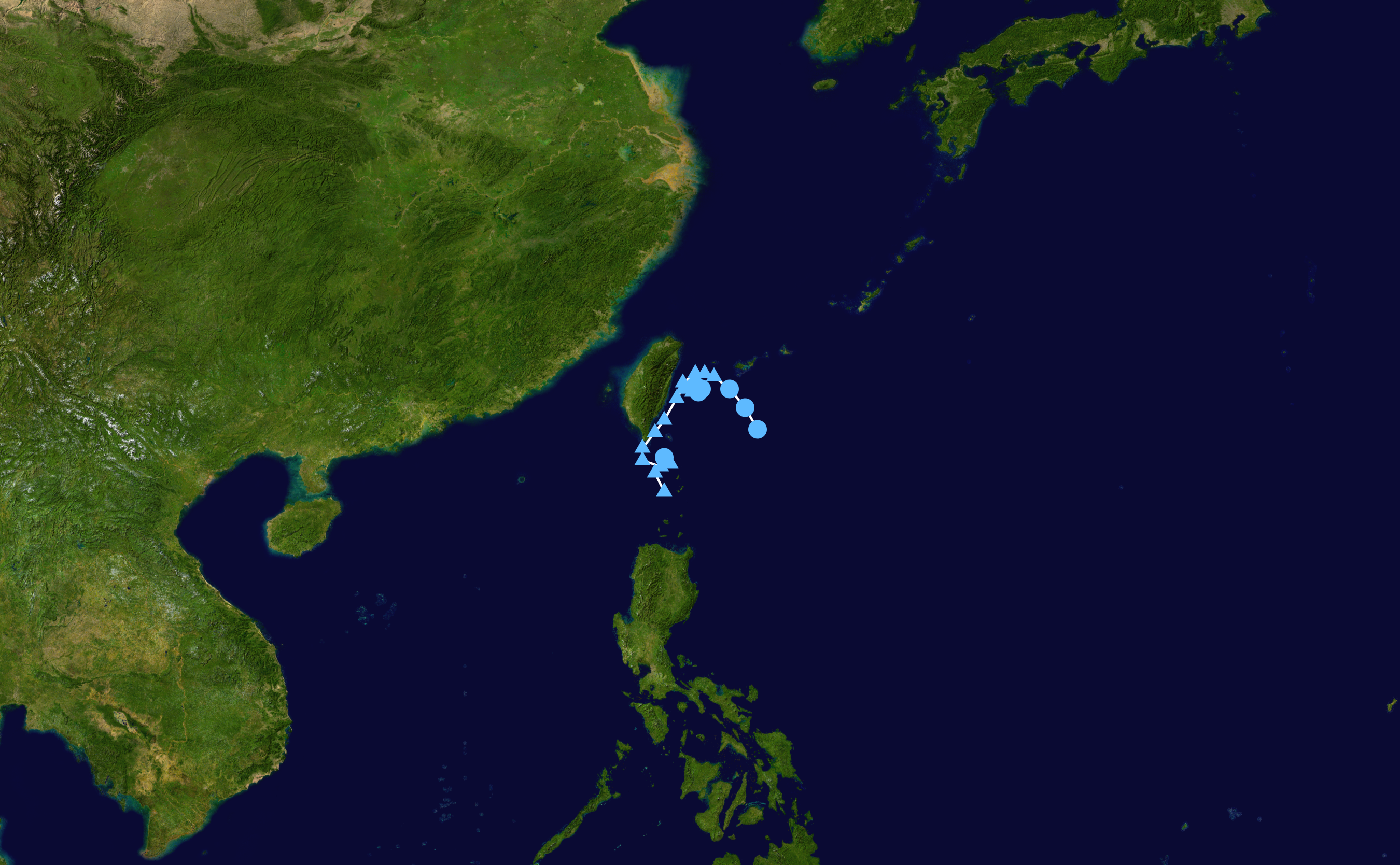
- Duration: August 31 – September 2
- Peak intensity: 55 km/h (35 mph) (10-min); 996 hPa (mbar)

Tropical Depression Miding was a short-lived tropical cyclone that formed in the Western Pacific. It moved in a generally southwestern direction. Due to its brief existence and offshore track, Miding caused no significant damage to any land areas. It primarily affected open waters, producing rough seas and gusty winds near its path.

=== Tropical Storm Fran (Norming) ===
- Severe tropical storm (JMA)
- Tropical storm (SSHWS)
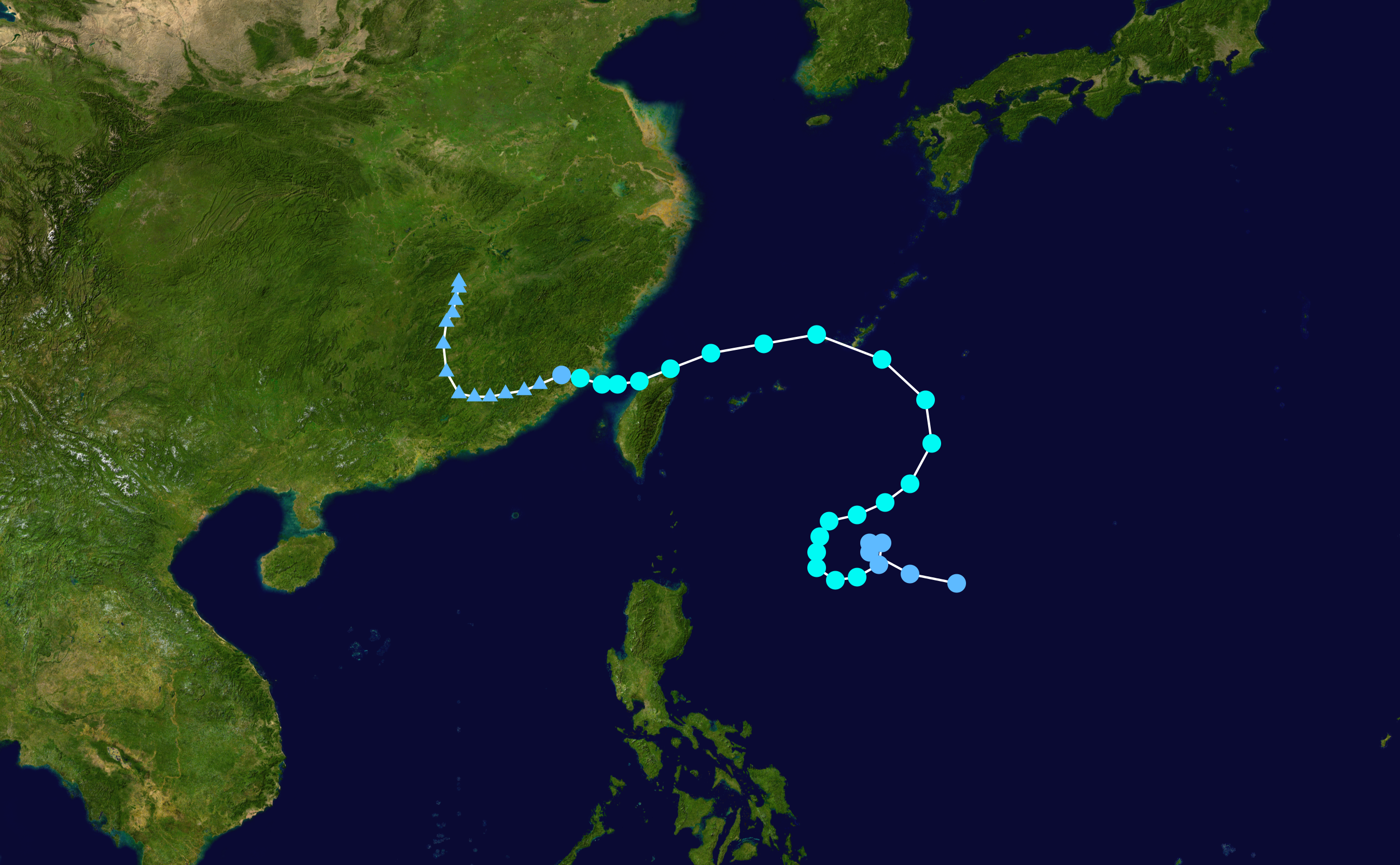
- Duration: September 3 – September 10
- Peak intensity: 100 km/h (65 mph) (1-min); 975 hPa (mbar)

Tropical Storm Fran formed east of the Philippines on the 3rd, then traveled in a rather unusual fashion, traveling away from the coast before turning back towards it. It passed over the northern part of Taiwan Island on the 6th, before making landfall in China on the 7th. The remnants of Fran lingered over China for some days before it dissipated.

=== Tropical Storm Ellen (Oyang) ===
- Tropical storm (JMA)
- Tropical storm (SSHWS)
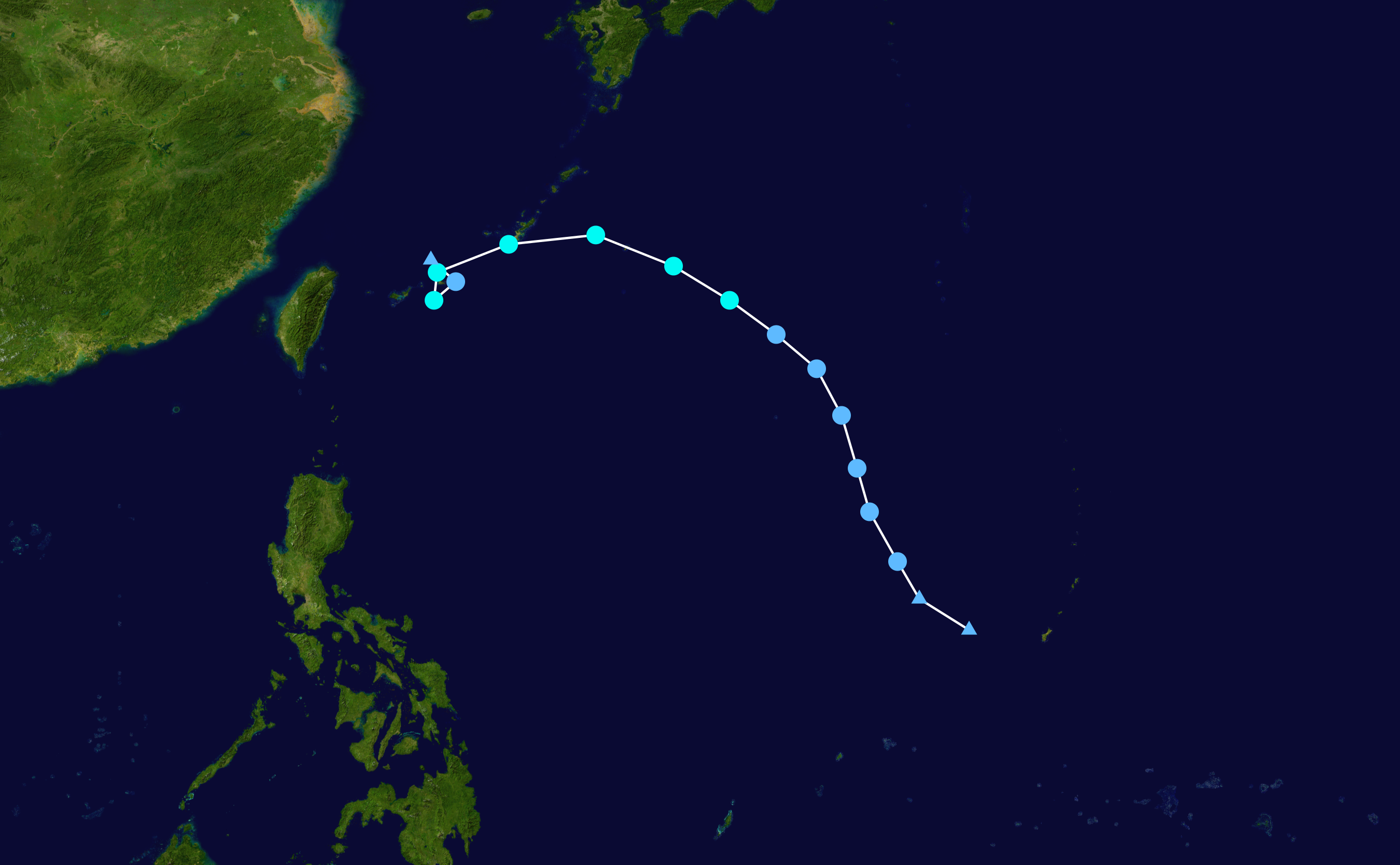
- Duration: September 3 – September 6
- Peak intensity: 85 km/h (50 mph) (1-min); 985 hPa (mbar)

Tropical Storm Ellen formed east of the Philippines and traveled northwestwards, becoming a tropical storm well south of Japan. It passed over the southern Ryukyu Islands before dissipating.

=== Super Typhoon Georgia (Pitang) ===
- Typhoon (JMA)
- Category 5 super typhoon (SSHWS)
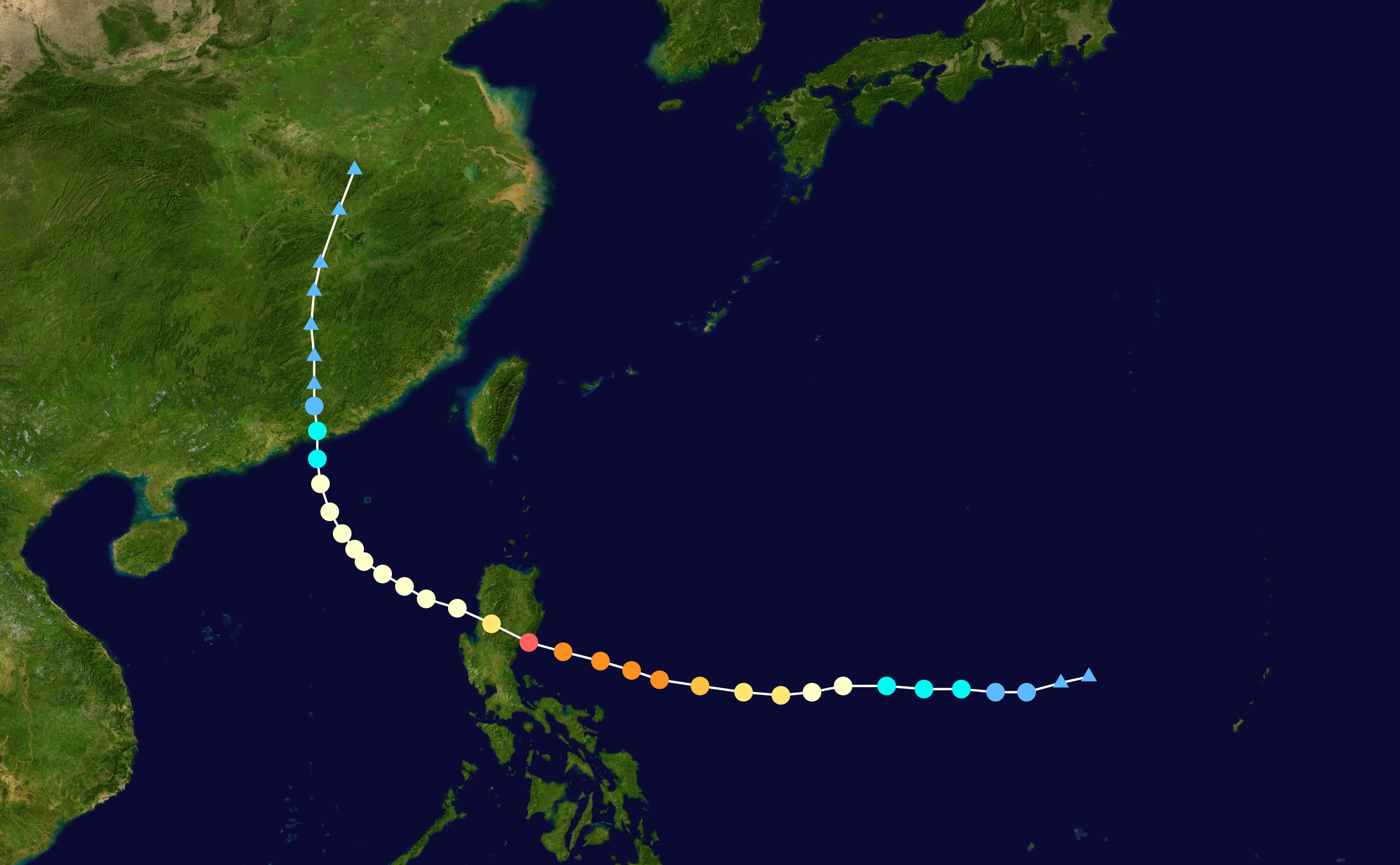
- Duration: September 7 – September 16
- Peak intensity: 260 km/h (160 mph) (1-min); 905 hPa (mbar)

Georgia originated from a tropical wave on September 7, and became tropical storm Georgia on the 8th. Moving over warmer waters, Georgia reached typhoon status late on the 8th and super typhoon status on the 10th, developing a distinct eye. Georgia continued to strengthen further and peaked as a 160 mph category 5 super typhoon, just as the typhoon made landfall at Luzon. Georgia did not drop a lot of rain during its passage through the Philippines, but its strong winds caused 95 casualties (with 80 missing) and damage at $1.4 million (1970 USD). Georgia greatly weakened over the Philippines, and emerged into the South China Sea on the 12th, as a category 1 typhoon. A trough turned Georgia to the north on the 13th, and Georgia made its final landfall in China, degenerating into a remnant low on the 14th, and completely dissipating on the 16th.

=== Super Typhoon Hope ===
- Typhoon (JMA)
- Category 5 super typhoon (SSHWS)
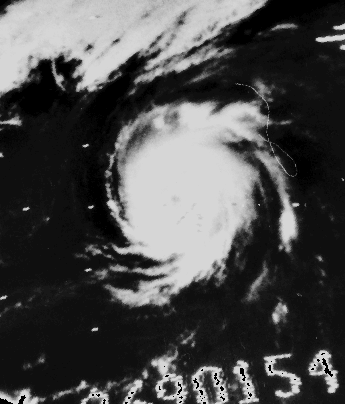
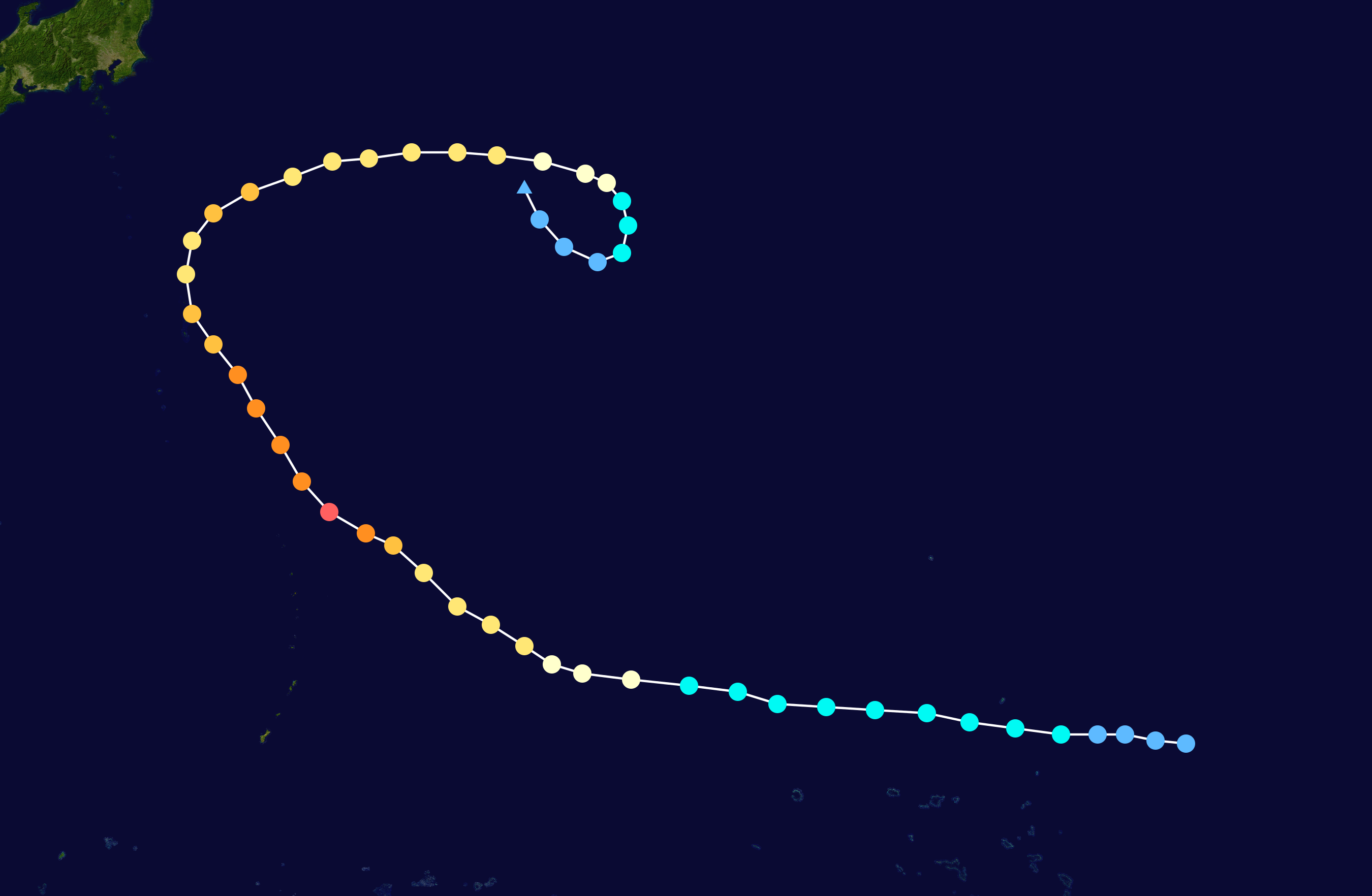
- Duration: September 19 – September 30
- Peak intensity: 280 km/h (175 mph) (1-min); 895 hPa (mbar)

The strongest storm of the season, Hope was a very strong category 5 super typhoon with pressure reaching 895 mbar. Hope did not affect land and stayed well out to sea. It formed in September 19 and dissipated on September 30.

=== Tropical Depression Ruping ===
- Tropical depression (JMA)
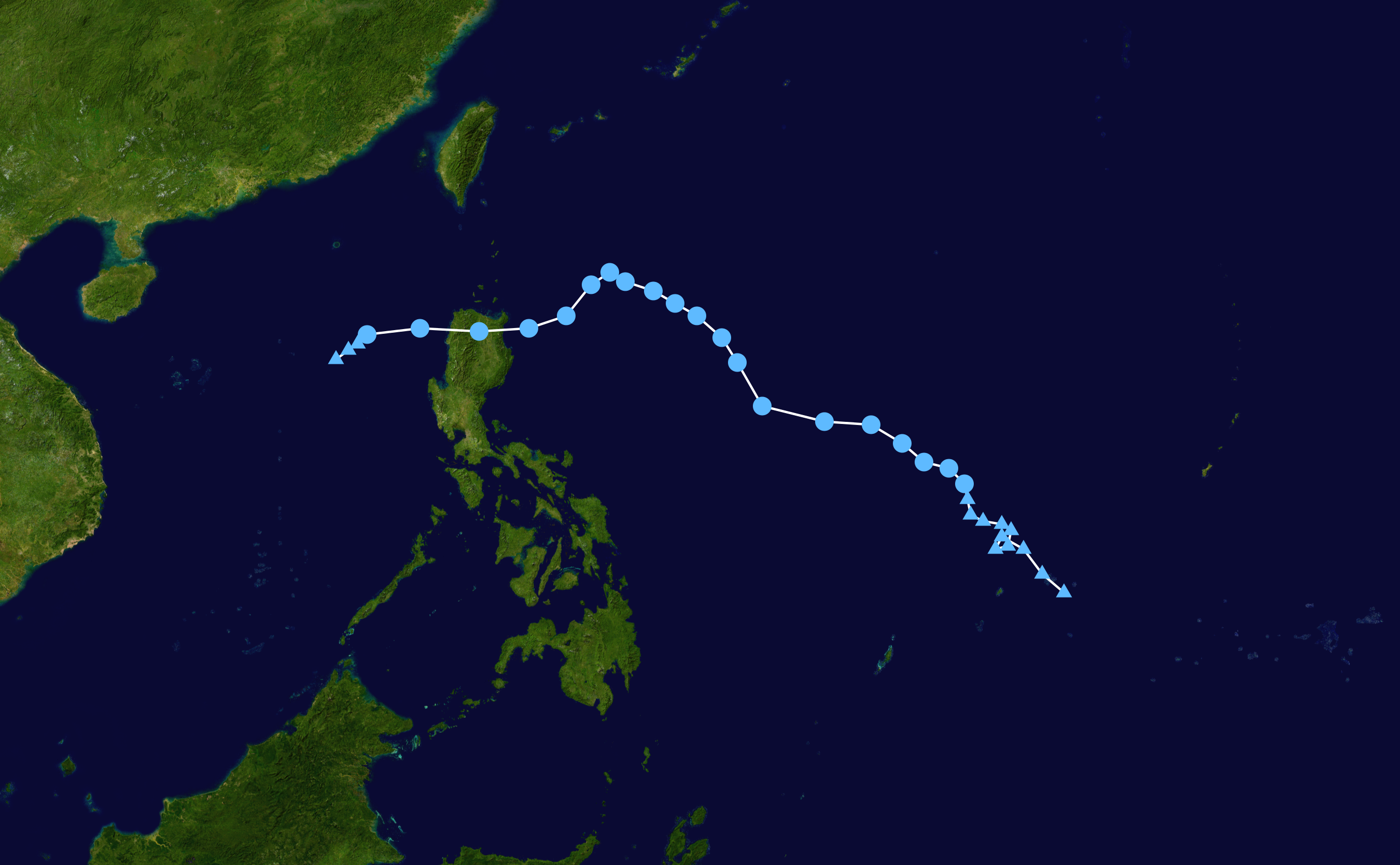
- Duration: September 18 – September 28
- Peak intensity: 55 km/h (35 mph) (10-min); 1000 hPa (mbar)

Tropical Depression Ruping was a weak but long-lasting tropical cyclone in the Western Pacific. The depression made landfall in the northern Philippines. Due to its weak intensity and largely offshore path, it did not cause significant damage on land but did create rough seas and gusty winds near its track.

=== Typhoon Iris ===
- Typhoon (JMA)
- Category 3 typhoon (SSHWS)
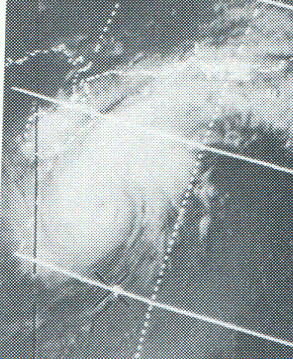
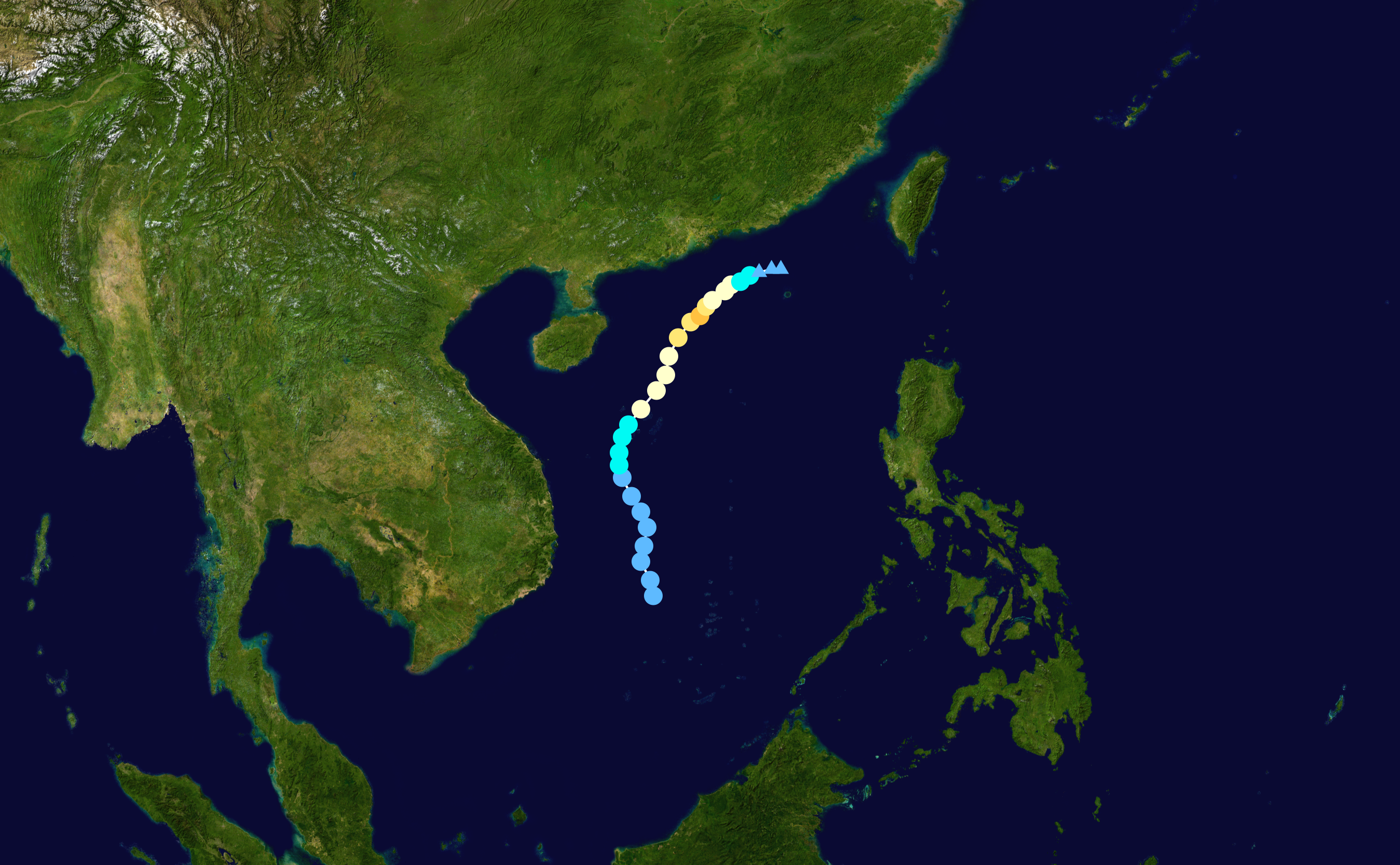
- Duration: October 2 – October 8
- Peak intensity: 185 km/h (115 mph) (1-min); 960 hPa (mbar)

Iris was the first typhoon to develop over the South China Sea in October since 1957. Iris developed on the 2nd due to a shear line. It intensified while slowly traveling northwards, reaching its maximum intensity on the afternoon of the 6th while 140 miles south of Hong Kong. The conditions around the system rapidly became unfavorable after that, and it weakened quickly, finally dissipating on the 9th.

=== Tropical Depression 20W ===
- Tropical depression (JMA)
- Tropical depression (SSHWS)
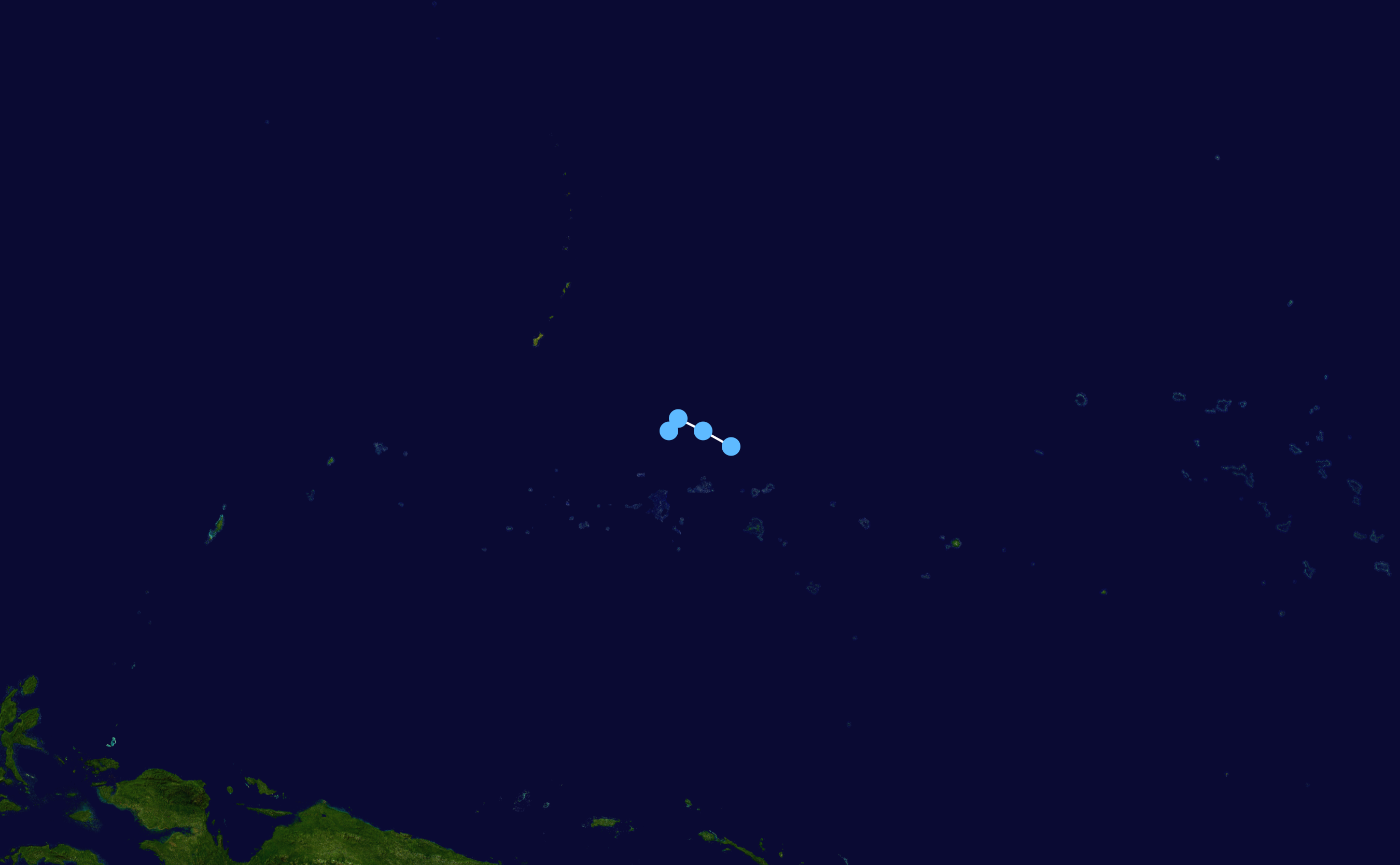
- Duration: October 4 – October 10
- Peak intensity: 55 km/h (35 mph) (10-min); 1004 hPa (mbar)

Tropical Depression 20W was a short-lived tropical depression that formed in the Pacific Ocean. It remained at sea and was a relatively weak system, so it did not cause any notable damage or fatalities.

=== Super Typhoon Joan (Sening) ===
- Typhoon (JMA)
- Category 5 super typhoon (SSHWS)
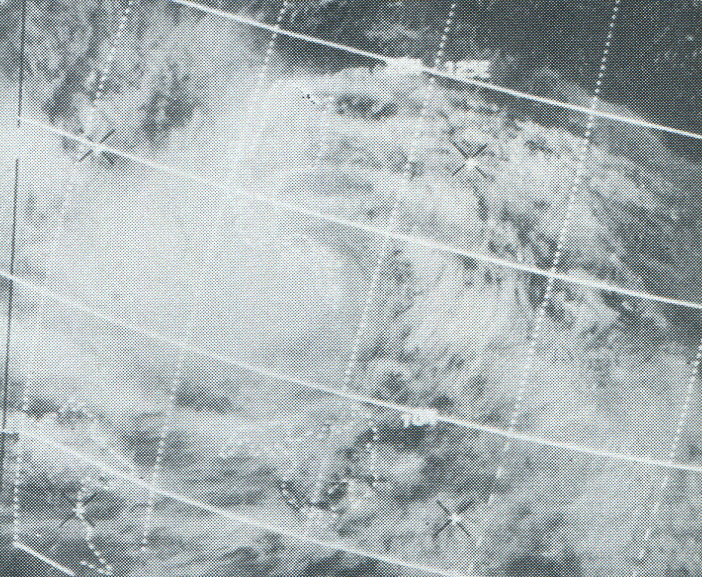
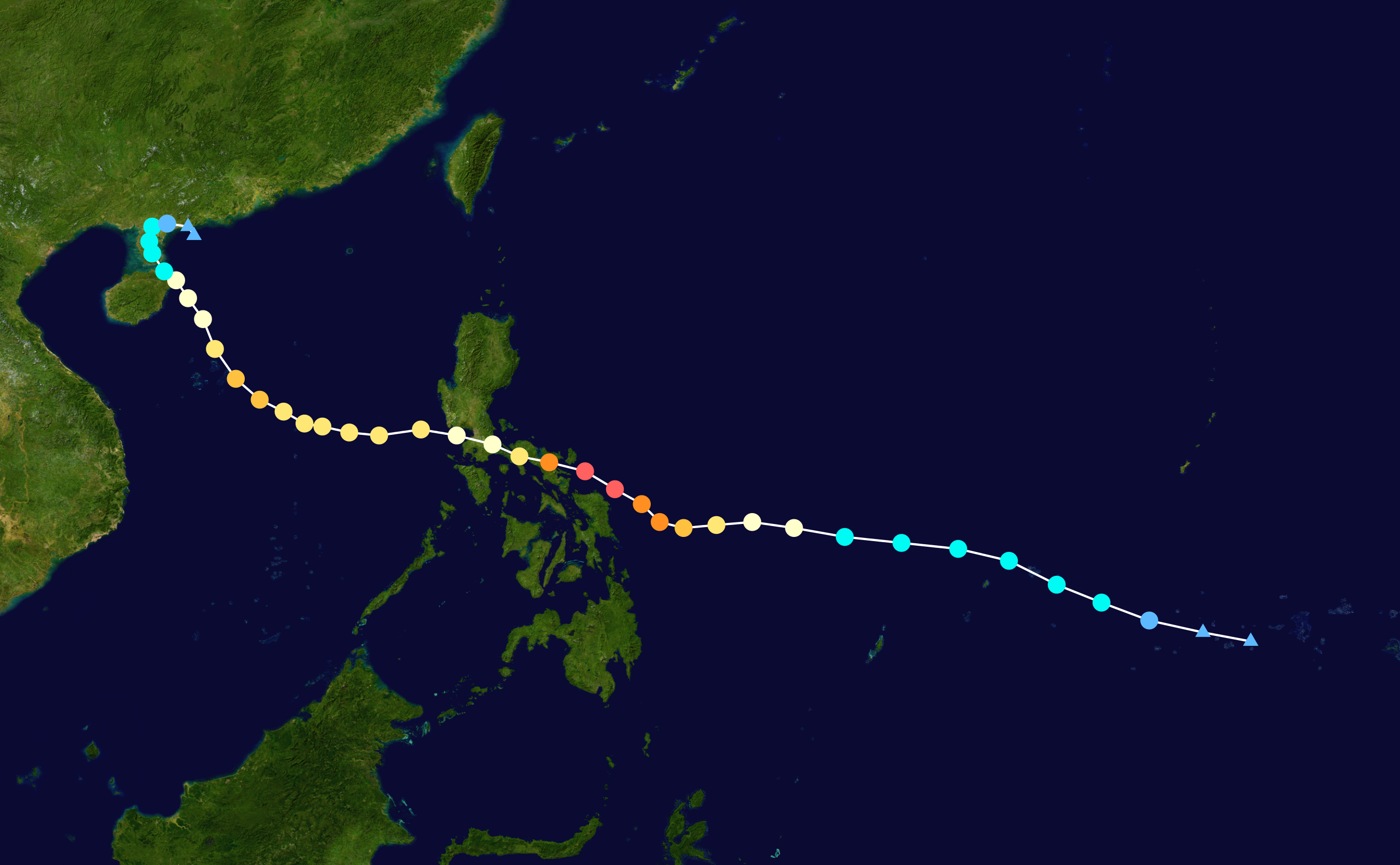
- Duration: October 9 – October 18
- Peak intensity: 280 km/h (175 mph) (1-min); 905 hPa (mbar)

A tropical disturbance organized into Tropical Storm Joan on October 10, east of the Philippines. Conditions favored strengthening, and Joan reached typhoon status on the 11th. From late on the 11th to early on the 13th, Typhoon Joan rapidly intensified to a 175 mph Super Typhoon. It struck the southeastern Luzon at that intensity on the 13th, and crossed the archipelago. After weakening to a minimal typhoon, Joan turned to the northwest, where it reintensified to a 115 mph typhoon. It made landfall on eastern Hainan Island on the 16th, and dissipated on the 18th over China. Joan left 768 people dead (with 193 missing), and caused $74 million in damage (1970 USD), mostly from agricultural losses.

=== Super Typhoon Kate (Titang) ===
- Typhoon (JMA)
- Category 4 super typhoon (SSHWS)
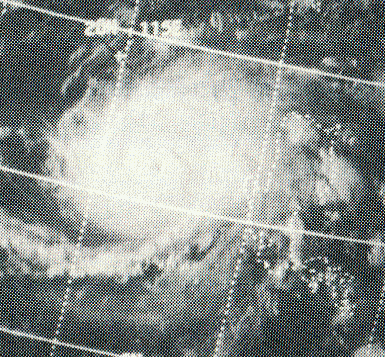
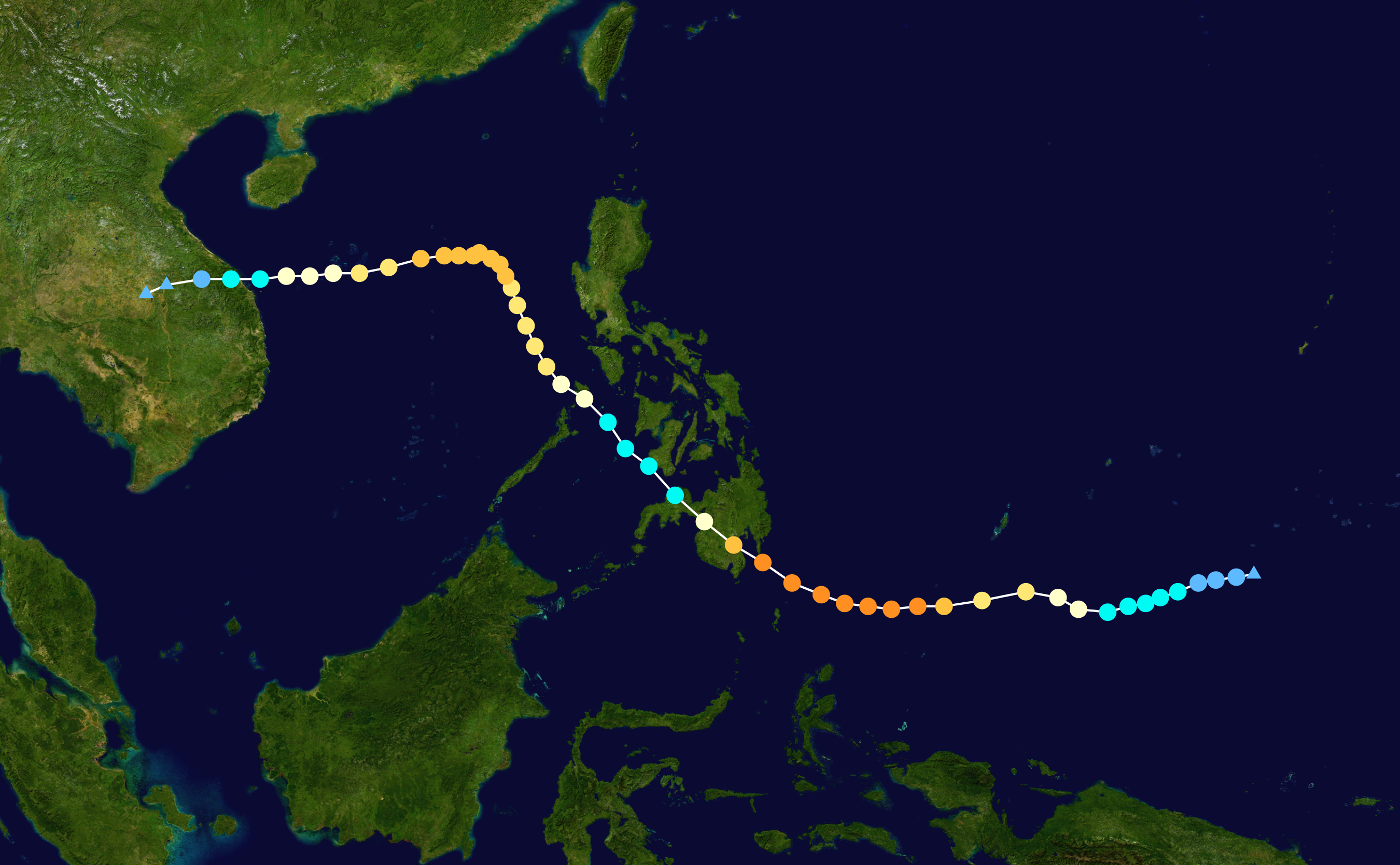
- Duration: October 14 – October 26
- Peak intensity: 240 km/h (150 mph) (1-min); 940 hPa (mbar)

Tropical Storm Kate developed just behind Typhoon Joan, east of the southern Philippines on October 14. It tracked westward as a small cyclone, and strengthened into a typhoon on the 15th. It made landfall twice, once in the Philippines and once in Vietnam, resulting in at least 631 fatalities (with 284 missing) and $50 million in damage.

=== Tropical Storm Louise (Uding) ===
- Typhoon (JMA)
- Tropical storm (SSHWS)
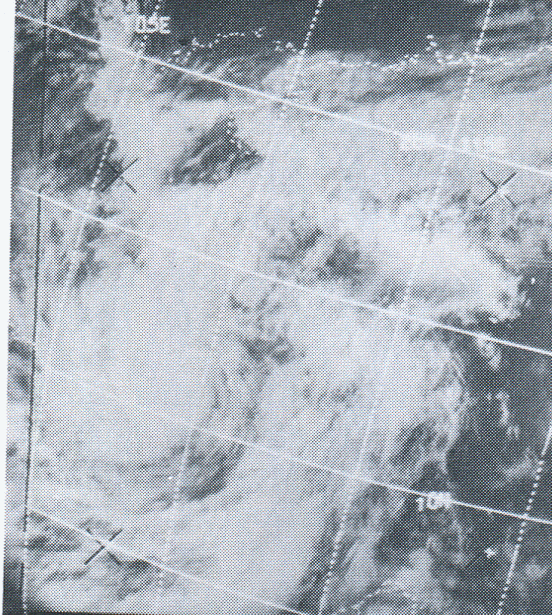
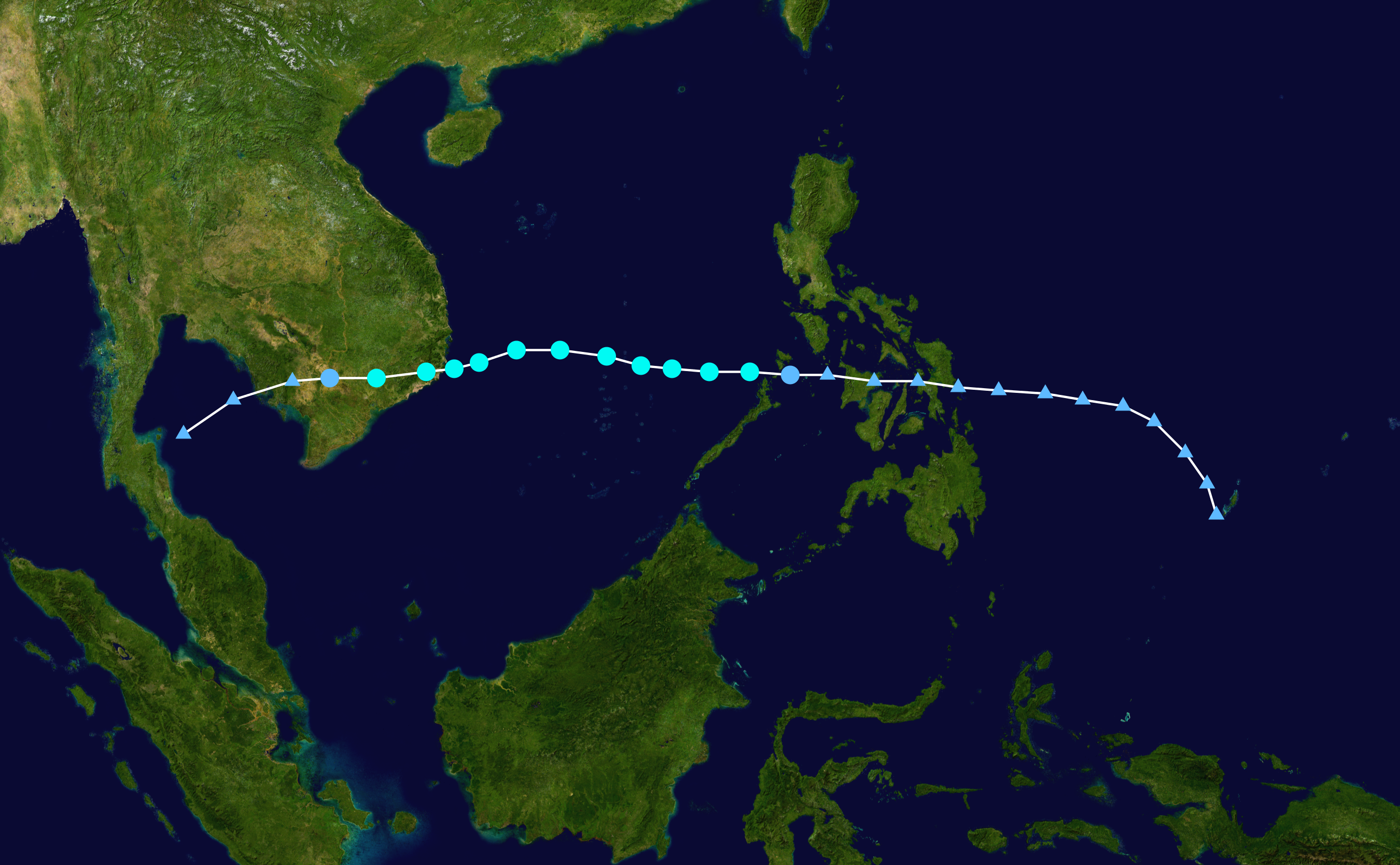
- Duration: October 23 – October 29
- Peak intensity: 110 km/h (70 mph) (1-min); 990 hPa (mbar)

Tropical Storm Louise (classified as a typhoon by the JMA) formed as a disturbance east of the Philippines. The disturbance traveled across them before it became a tropical storm over the South China Sea. It made landfall in South Vietnam and dissipated over the Gulf of Thailand.

=== Tropical Storm Marge (Wening) ===
- Severe tropical storm (JMA)
- Tropical storm (SSHWS)
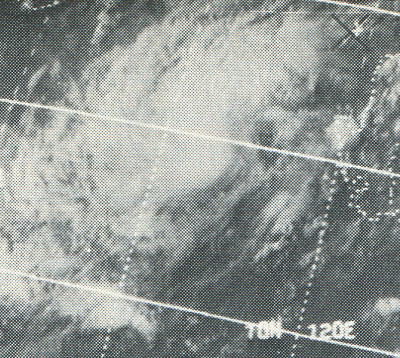
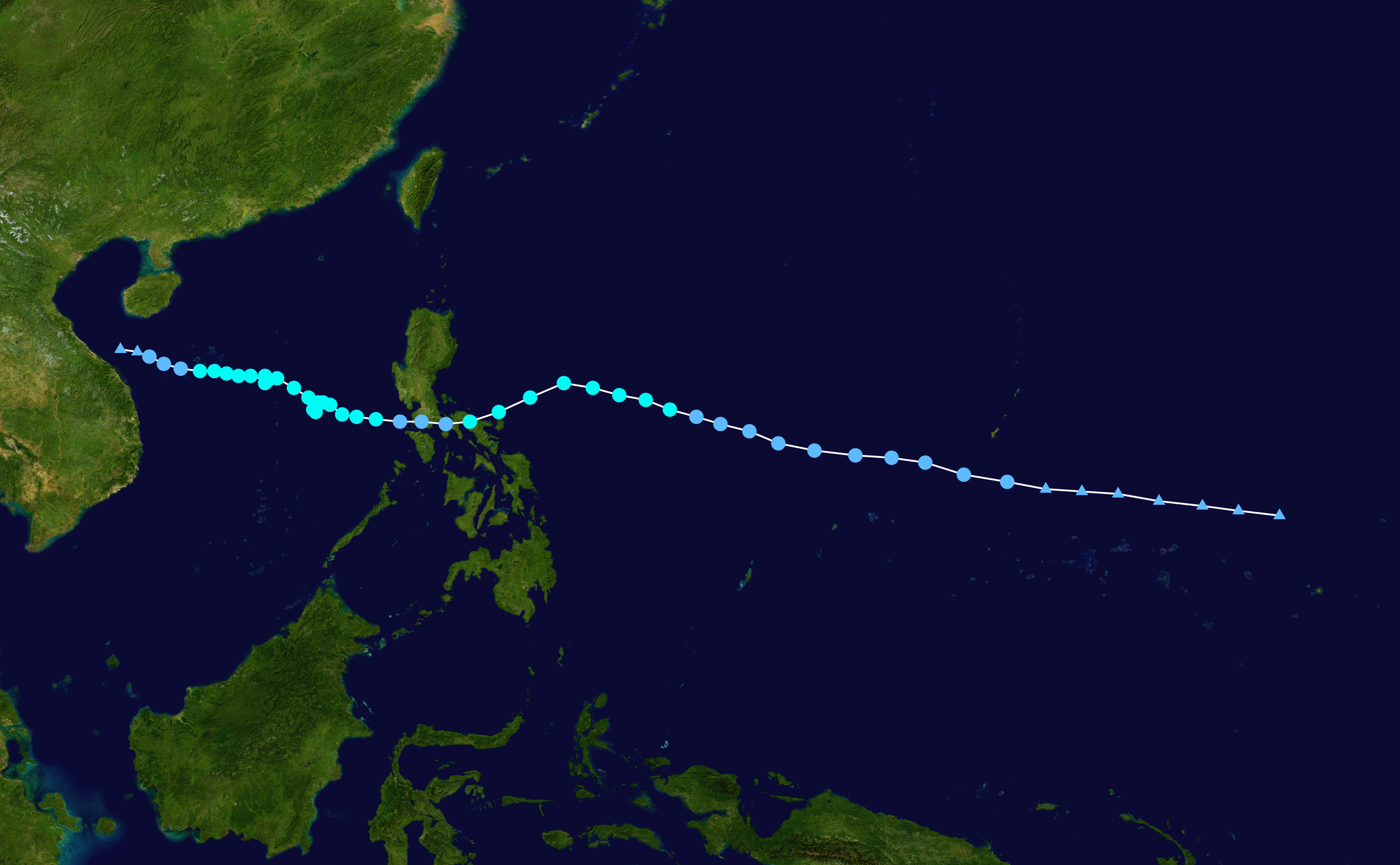
- Duration: October 27 – November 8
- Peak intensity: 100 km/h (65 mph) (1-min); 990 hPa (mbar)

Tropical Storm Marge followed a similar path to Louise. It formed over the Pacific, becoming a tropical depression south of Guam. It became a tropical storm 3 days later, then crossed southern Luzon before dissipating over the South China Sea off the Vietnamese coast.

=== Tropical Storm Nora ===
- Tropical storm (JMA)
- Tropical storm (SSHWS)
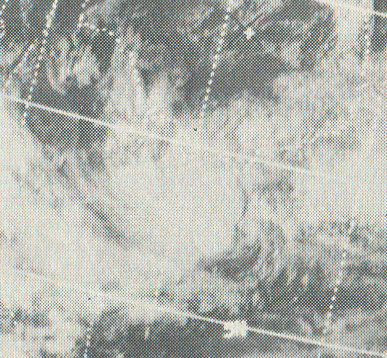
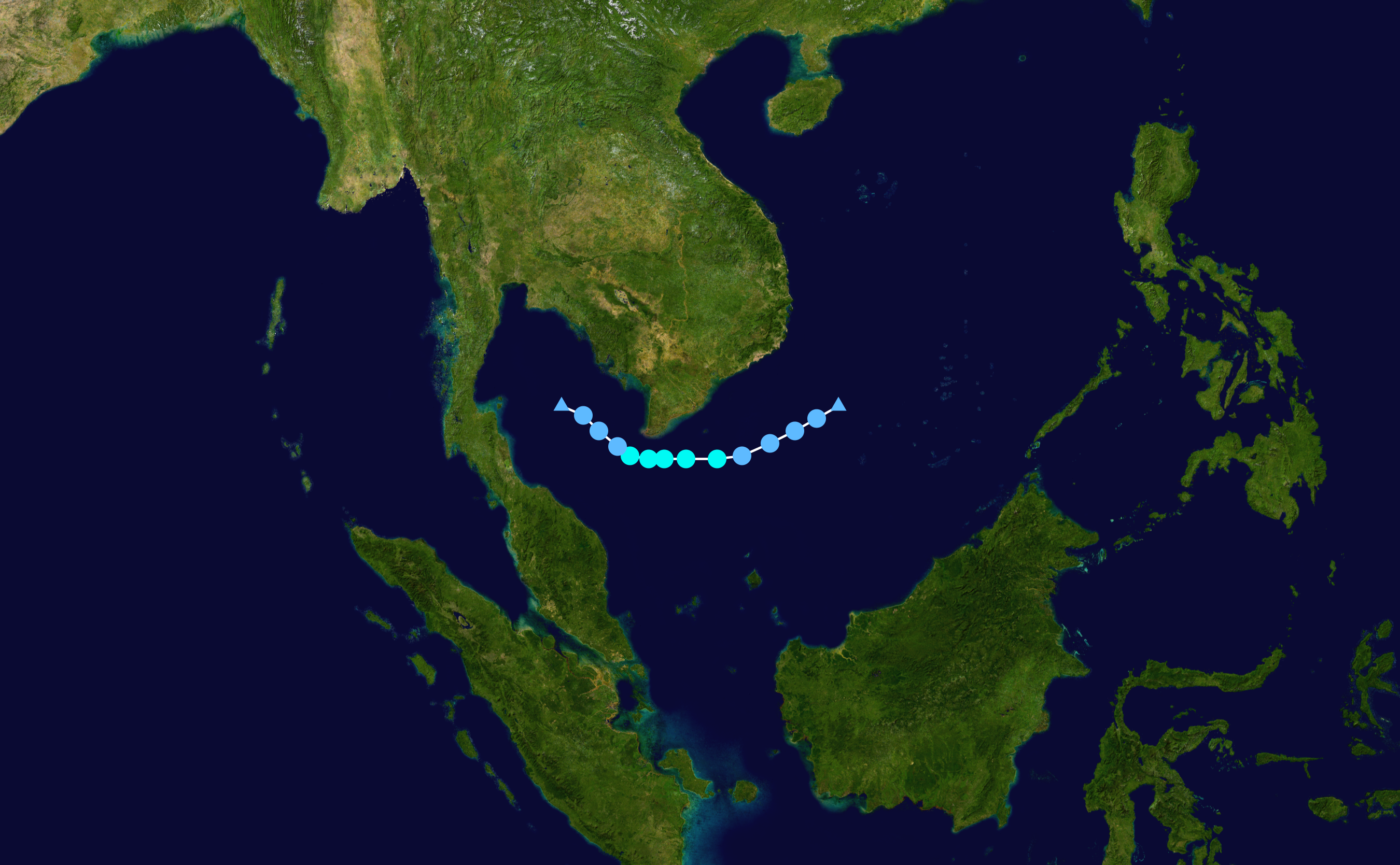
- Duration: November 1 – November 4
- Peak intensity: 95 km/h (60 mph) (1-min); 1000 hPa (mbar)

Tropical Storm Nora formed south of Vietnam and began to strengthen, becoming a tropical storm the next day. The system passed south of Cape Cà Mau as a tropical storm before weakening and dissipating over the Gulf of Thailand. The remnants of Nora then crossed the Malay Peninsula on the 5th, and contributed to the formation of the 1970 Bhola cyclone on the 8th, which devastated East Pakistan (Modern day Bangladesh).

=== Tropical Storm Opal ===
- Severe tropical storm (JMA)
- Tropical storm (SSHWS)
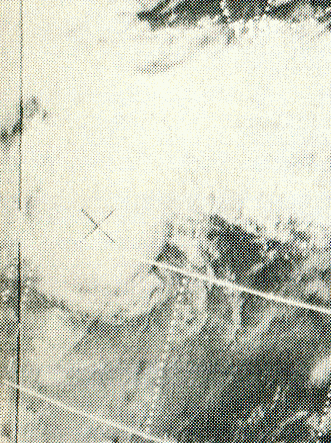
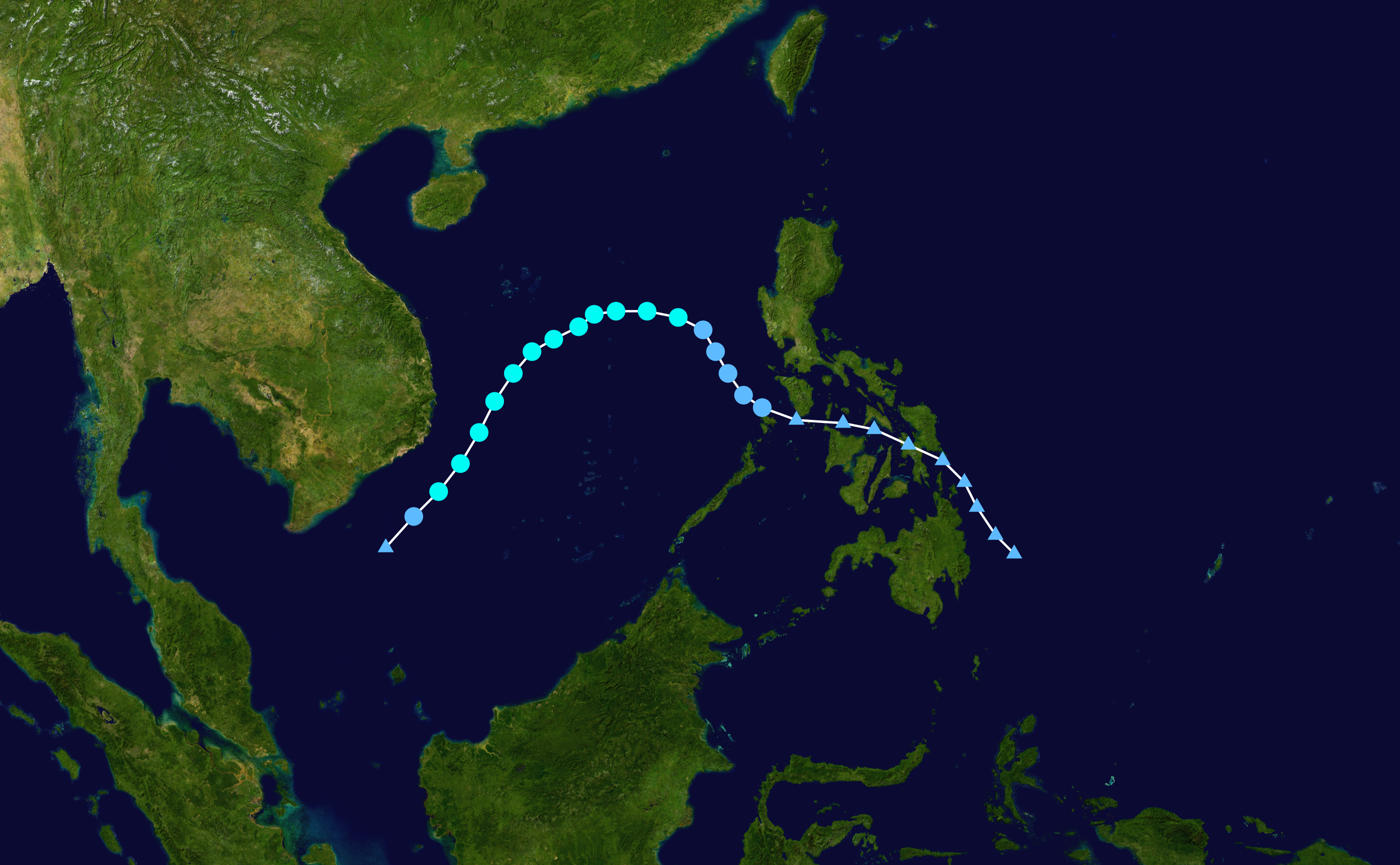
- Duration: November 11 – November 17
- Peak intensity: 95 km/h (60 mph) (1-min); 990 hPa (mbar)

Tropical Storm Opal formed as a disturbance over the sea east of Mindanao, then crossed the Philippines before becoming a depression over the South China Sea. It intensified into a tropical storm as it turned southwestward over the South China Sea, passing close to Vietnam, but it dissipated southeast of the Mekong Delta.

=== Super Typhoon Patsy (Yoling) ===
- Typhoon (JMA)
- Category 4 super typhoon (SSHWS)
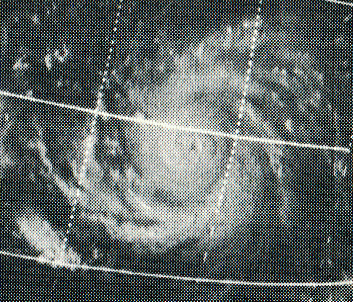
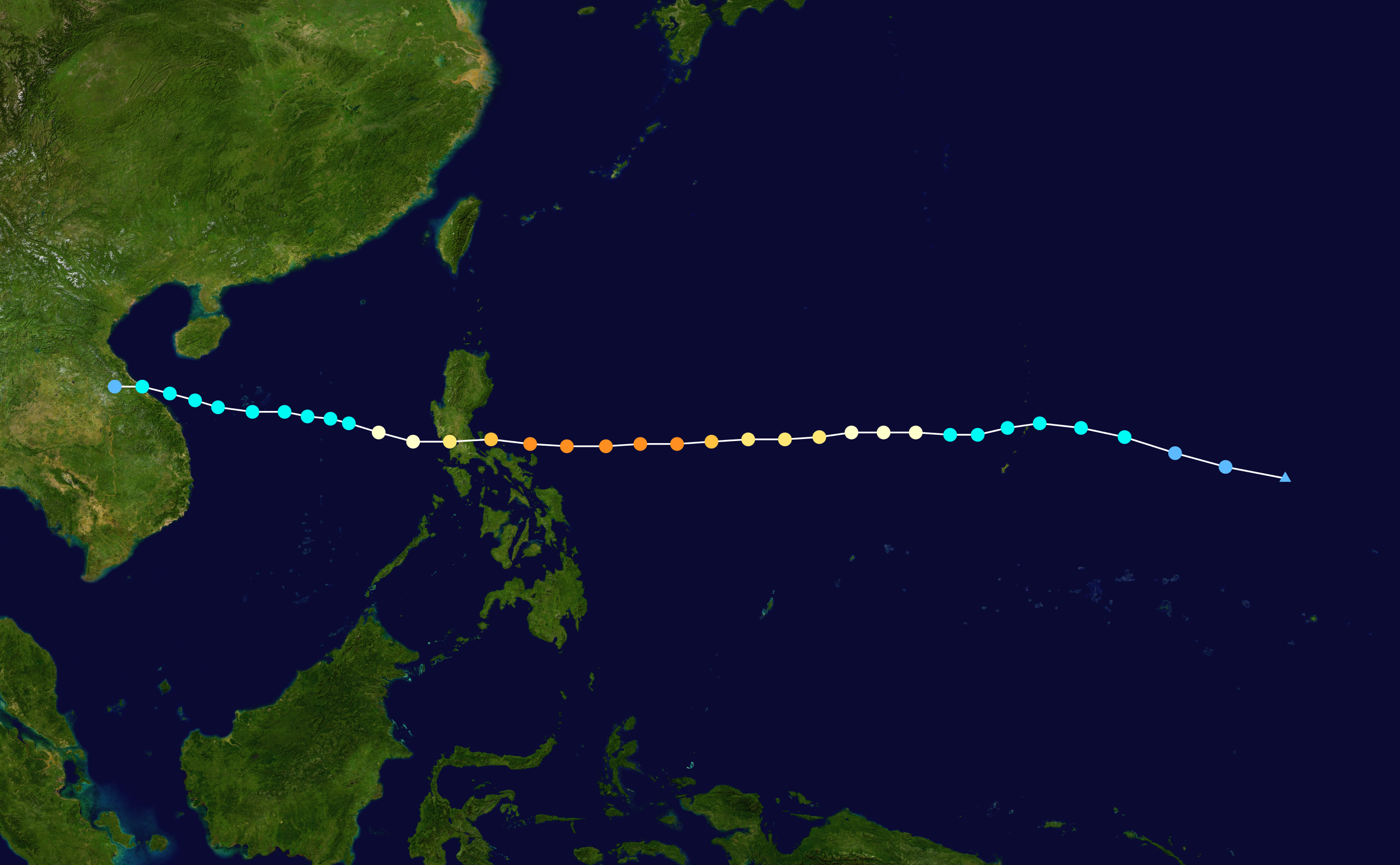
- Duration: November 14 – November 22
- Peak intensity: 250 km/h (155 mph) (1-min); 910 hPa (mbar)

A tropical disturbance organized into Tropical Depression 27W on November 14 near the Marianas Islands. A strong ridge to its north forced it westward, where it strengthened to tropical storm status later on the 14th. Patsy steadily intensified, reaching typhoon strength on the 16th and peaking at 155 mph on the 18th. Its inflow became disrupted by the Philippines to its west, and Patsy hit Luzon on the 19th with winds of 130 mph, making it the 3rd strong typhoon since September to strike the island. After crossing the island, Patsy traversed the South China Sea, where cooler waters kept the system a tropical storm. On November 22, Patsy struck Vietnam, and dissipated soon after. Typhoon Patsy was one of the deadliest typhoons to strike the Philippines in its history. 611 people were killed (with 351 missing) on the island, and 135 people were killed at sea due to shipping failures. Because the Vietnam War was raging at that time, it is difficult to say about the damage or death toll, but estimates say that 30 people died in Vietnam.

=== Tropical Storm Ruth (Aning) ===
- Tropical storm (JMA)
- Tropical storm (SSHWS)
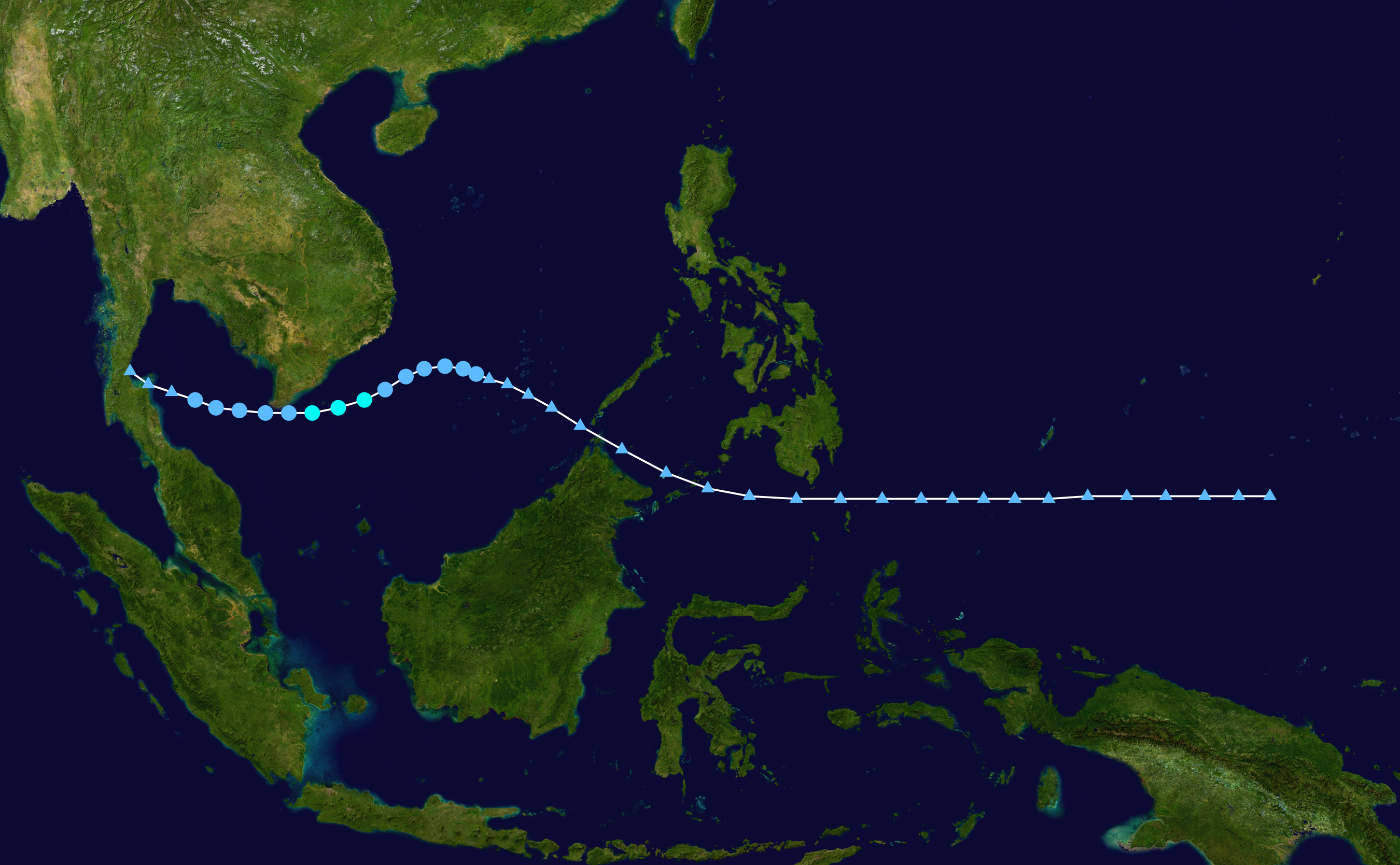
- Duration: November 24 – November 29
- Peak intensity: 75 km/h (45 mph) (1-min); 996 hPa (mbar)

Tropical Storm Ruth formed as a disturbance far at sea, then slowly travelled westward, but it did not intensify into a tropical depression until it was in the South China Sea. It briefly became a tropical storm south of the Mekong Delta, but it weakened into a tropical depression before it crossed just south of Cape Cà Mau. The remnants of Ruth dissipated just off the coast of Thailand.

=== Tropical Depression Bidang ===
- Tropical depression (JMA)
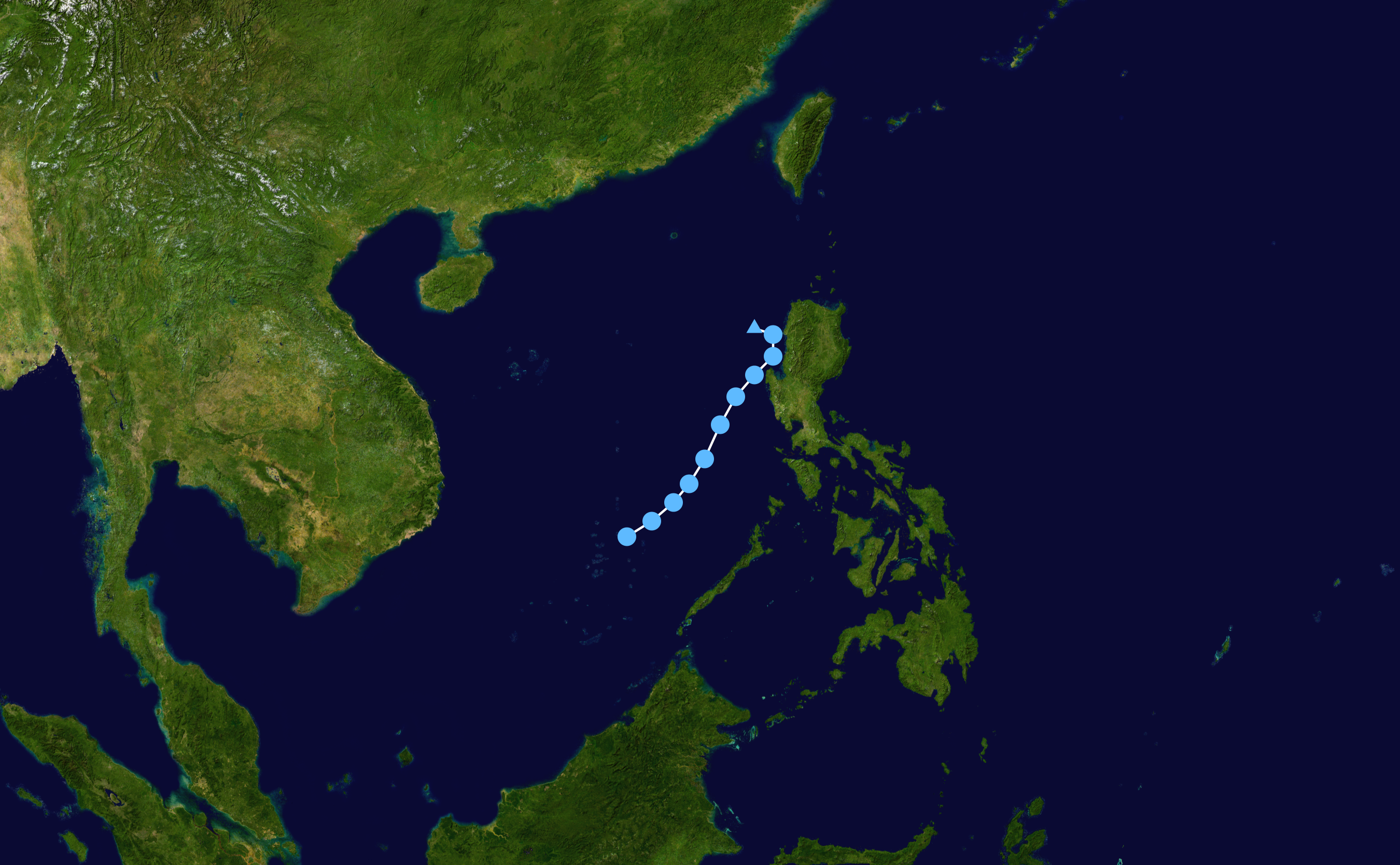
- Duration: December 15 – December 19
- Peak intensity: 55 km/h (35 mph) (10-min); 1002 hPa (mbar)

Tropical Depression Bidang developed in the western Pacific Ocean. It was a relatively weak storm, and due to its weak intensity and offshore track, it had no significant impact on land.

=== Other systems ===
According to the Japan Meteorological Agency, on September 2 Tropical Cyclone Dot briefly crossed the International Date Line from the Central Pacific into its area of responsibility, crossing back later that day.

== Storm names ==
Western North Pacific tropical cyclones were named by the Joint Typhoon Warning Center. The first storm of 1970 was named Nancy and the final one was named Ruth.

- Agnes
- Bonnie
- Carmen
- Della
- Elaine
- Faye
- Gloria
- Hester
- Irma
- Judy
- Kit
- Lola
- Mamie
- Nina
- Ora
- Phyllis
- Rita
- Susan
- Tess
- Viola
- Winnie
- Alice
- Betty
- Cora
- Doris
- Elsie
- Flossie
- Grace
- Helen
- Ida
- June
- Kathy
- Lorna
- Marie
- Nancy 1W
- Olga 2W
- Pamela 3W
- Ruby 4W
- Sally 5W
- Therese 8W
- Violet 9W
- Wilda 10W
- Anita 11W
- Billie 12W
- Clara 13W
- Dot 14C
- Ellen 15W
- Fran 16W
- Georgia 17W
- Hope 18W
- Iris 19W
- Joan 21W
- Kate 22W
- Louise 23W
- Marge 24W
- Nora 25W
- Opal 26W
- Patsy 27W
- Ruth 28W
- Sarah
- Thelma
- Vera
- Wanda
- Amy
- Babe
- Carla
- Dinah
- Emma
- Freda
- Gilda
- Harriet
- Ivy
- Jean
- Kim
- Lucy
- Mary
- Nadine
- Olive
- Polly
- Rose
- Shirley
- Trix
- Virginia
- Wendy

One Central Pacific System developed, Hurricane Dot. The policy at that time was to use Western Pacific Names for the Central Pacific.

=== Philippines ===
Atang	Bising	Klaring	Deling	Emang
Gading	Heling	Iliang	Loleng	Miding
Norming	Oyang	Pitang	Ruping	Sening
Titang	Uding	Wening	Yoling	
Auxiliary list
				Aning
Bidang	Kading (unused)	Delang (unused)	Esang (unused)	Garding (unused)

The Philippine Atmospheric, Geophysical and Astronomical Services Administration uses its own naming scheme for tropical cyclones in their area of responsibility. PAGASA assigns names to tropical depressions that form within their area of responsibility and any tropical cyclone that might move into their area of responsibility. Should the list of names for a given year prove to be insufficient, names are taken from an auxiliary list, the first 6 of which are published each year before the season starts. Names not retired from this list will be used again in the 1974 season. This is the same list used for the 1966 season. PAGASA uses its own naming scheme that starts in the Filipino alphabet, with names of Filipino female names ending with "ng" (A, B, K, D, etc.). Names that were not assigned/going to use are marked in gray.

=== Retirement ===
Due to the severe damage in the Philippines, PAGASA later retired the names Pitang, Sening, Titang, and Yoling. Those were replaced by Pasing, Susang, Tering, and Yaning for the 1974 season. This season had the most retired names by PAGASA at that time.

== Season effects ==
This table will list all the storms that developed in the northwestern Pacific Ocean west of the International Date Line and north of the equator during 1970. It will include their intensity, duration, name, areas affected, deaths, missing persons (in parentheses), and damage totals. Classification and intensity values will be based on estimations conducted by the JMA, however due to lack of information around this time sustained winds were recorded by the JTWC. All damage figures will be in 1970 USD. Damages and deaths from a storm will include when the storm was a precursor wave or an extratropical low.

Name	Dates	Peak intensity			Areas affected	Damage (USD)	Deaths	Ref(s).
Name	Dates	Category	Wind speed	Pressure	Areas affected	Damage (USD)	Deaths	Ref(s).
TD	January 1 – 2	Tropical depression	Not specified	1008 hPa (29.77 inHg)	None	None	None	
TD	January 9	Tropical depression	Not specified	1010 hPa (29.83 inHg)	None	None	None	
Nancy (Atang)	February 19 – 28	Violent typhoon	220 km/h (140 mph)	950 hPa (28.05 inHg)	Caroline Islands, Philippines	$160,000	None	
TD	March 14 – 17	Tropical depression	Not specified	1004 hPa (29.65 inHg)	Palau, Philippines	None	None	
Bising	June 11 – 13	Tropical depression	55 km/h (35 mph)	997 hPa (29.44 inHg)	Taiwan	None	None	
TD	June 23 – 24	Tropical depression	Not specified	1008 hPa (29.77 inHg)	Philippines	None	None	
Olga (Deling)	June 27 – July 5	Violent typhoon	260 km/h (160 mph)	905 hPa (26.72 inHg)	Caroline Islands, Ryukyu Islands, Japan, South Korea	$10 million	49	
Pamela (Klaring)	June 28 – July 1	Severe tropical storm	95 km/h (60 mph)	980 hPa (28.94 inHg)	Philippines	Unknown	Unknown	
TD	July 9	Tropical depression	Not specified	1008 hPa (29.77 inHg)	None	None	None	
TD	July 10 – 11	Tropical depression	Not specified	1008 hPa (29.77 inHg)	None	None	None	
Ruby (Emang)	July 11 – 17	Severe tropical storm	100 km/h (65 mph)	985 hPa (29.09 inHg)	Philippines, South China	None	None	
TD	July 10 – 12	Tropical depression	Not specified	1008 hPa (29.77 inHg)	None	None	None	
TD	July 15 – 30	Tropical depression	Not specified	1004 hPa (29.65 inHg)	None	None	None	
Sally	July 19 – 23	Tropical storm	75 km/h (45 mph)	992 hPa (29.29 inHg)	None	None	None	
TD	July 19 – August 2	Tropical depression	Not specified	996 hPa (29.65 inHg)	None	None	None	
07W (Gading)	July 25 – August 2	Tropical depression	85 km/h (50 mph)	996 hPa (29.41 inHg)	Taiwan, East China	None	None	
06W	July 28 – August 1	Tropical storm	75 km/h (45 mph)	994 hPa (29.35 inHg)	Ryukyu Islands	None	None	
TD	July 29	Tropical depression	Not specified	1006 hPa (29.71 inHg)	Ryukyu Islands	None	None	
Therese	August 1 – 4	Tropical storm	75 km/h (45 mph)	990 hPa (29.23 inHg)	None	None	None	
TD	August 1	Tropical depression	Not specified	1000 hPa (29.71 inHg)	None	None	None	
TD	August 3	Tropical depression	Not specified	1008 hPa (29.77 inHg)	None	None	None	
Violet (Heling)	August 3 – 9	Tropical storm	75 km/h (45 mph)	992 hPa (29.29 inHg)	Philippines, South China	None	None	
TD	August 6 – 9	Tropical depression	Not specified	1004 hPa (29.65 inHg)	None	None	None	
Wilda (Iliang)	August 9 – 15	Violent typhoon	195 km/h (120 mph)	940 hPa (27.76 inHg)	Ryukyu Islands, Japan	Unknown	11	
TD	August 11 – 16	Tropical depression	Not specified	1004 hPa (29.65 inHg)	Philippines	None	None	
TD	August 12 – 16	Tropical depression	Not specified	1004 hPa (29.65 inHg)	Vietnam	None	None	
TD	August 12 – 15	Tropical depression	Not specified	1006 hPa (29.71 inHg)	Mariana Islands	None	None	
TD	August 14 – 19	Tropical depression	Not specified	997 hPa (29.44 inHg)	Vietnam	None	None	
TD	August 14 – 16	Tropical depression	Not specified	1004 hPa (29.65 inHg)	Ryukyu Islands	None	None	
Anita	August 15 – 22	Violent typhoon	250 km/h (155 mph)	910 hPa (26.87 inHg)	Japan	None	31	
TD	August 15 – 20	Tropical depression	Not specified	1006 hPa (29.71 inHg)	Japan	None	None	
TD	August 18	Tropical depression	Not specified	1004 hPa (29.65 inHg)	None	None	None	
Billie (Loleng)	August 21 – 31	Violent typhoon	205 km/h (125 mph)	945 hPa (27.91 inHg)	Ryukyu Islands, Korean Peninsula	Unknown	Unknown	
TD	August 21	Tropical depression	Not specified	1008 hPa (29.77 inHg)	None	None	None	
Clara	August 25 – September 4	Typhoon	155 km/h (100 mph)	960 hPa (28.35 inHg)	None	None	None	
TD	August 25 – 31	Tropical depression	Not specified	1004 hPa (29.65 inHg)	None	None	None	
TD	August 25 – 26	Tropical depression	Not specified	1004 hPa (29.65 inHg)	None	None	None	
Miding	August 31 – September 2	Tropical depression	55 km/h (35 mph)	996 hPa (29.41 inHg)	Taiwan	None	None	
Dot	September 2	Severe ropical storm	75 km/h (45 mph)	1004 hPa (29.65 inHg)	None	None	None	
Fran (Norming)	September 3 – 10	Severe tropical storm	100 km/h (65 mph)	975 hPa (28.79 inHg)	Ryukyu Islands, Taiwan, East China	None	None	
TD	September 3	Tropical depression	Not specified	1000 hPa (29.53 inHg)	Laos	None	None	
Ellen (Oyang)	September 3 – 6	Tropical storm	85 km/h (50 mph)	985 hPa (29.09 inHg)	Ryukyu Islands	None	None	
TD	September 4	Tropical depression	Not specified	1006 hPa (29.71 inHg)	None	None	None	
Georgia (Pitang)	September 7 – 16	Violent typhoon	260 km/h (160 mph)	905 hPa (26.72 inHg)	Philippines, China	$1.4 million	95	
TD	September 11 – 13	Tropical depression	Not specified	1008 hPa (29.77 inHg)	None	None	None	
TD	September 13	Tropical depression	Not specified	1008 hPa (29.77 inHg)	None	None	None	
TD	September 16 – 24	Tropical depression	Not specified	1006 hPa (29.71 inHg)	None	None	None	
Ruping	September 18 – 28	Tropical depression	45 km/h (30 mph)	1000 hPa (29.53 inHg)	Philippines	None	None	
Hope	September 19 – 30	Violent typhoon	280 km/h (175 mph)	895 hPa (26.43 inHg)	None	None	None	
TD	September 27 – October 4	Tropical depression	Not specified	1004 hPa (29.65 inHg)	None	None	None	
TD	October 1 – 4	Tropical depression	Not specified	1002 hPa (29.59 inHg)	None	None	None	
Iris	October 2 – 8	Very strong typhoon	185 km/h (115 mph)	960 hPa (28.35 inHg)	South China	None	None	
TD	October 4	Tropical depression	Not specified	1006 hPa (29.71 inHg)	None	None	None	
20W	October 4 – 10	Tropical depression	45 km/h (35 mph)	1004 hPa (29.65 inHg)	None	None	None	
TD	October 7	Tropical depression	Not specified	1004 hPa (29.65 inHg)	None	None	None	
Joan (Sening)	October 9 – 18	Violent typhoon	280 km/h (175 mph)	905 hPa (26.72 inHg)	Caroline Islands, Philippines, South China	$74 million	768	
TD	October 12	Tropical depression	Not specified	1006 hPa (29.71 inHg)	Vietnam	None	None	
TD	October 14 – 19	Tropical depression	Not specified	1002 hPa (29.59 inHg)	None	None	None	
Kate (Titang)	October 14 – 26	Violent typhoon	240 km/h (150 mph)	940 hPa (27.76 inHg)	Philippines	$50 million	631	
TD	October 18 – 19	Tropical depression	Not specified	1008 hPa (29.77 inHg)	None	None	None	
TD	October 18 – 19	Tropical depression	Not specified	1006 hPa (29.71 inHg)	None	None	None	
TD	October 23 – 24	Tropical depression	Not specified	1010 hPa (29.83 inHg)	None	None	None	
Louise (Uding)	October 23 – 29	Typhoon	110 km/h (70 mph)	990 hPa (29.23 inHg)	Philippines, Vietnam, Laos	None	None	
Marge (Wening)	October 27 – November 8	Severe tropical storm	100 km/h (65 mph)	990 hPa (29.23 inHg)	Philippines, Vietnam	None	None	
TD	October 27 – 29	Tropical depression	Not specified	1012 hPa (29.88 inHg)	None	None	None	
TD	October 29 – 30	Tropical depression	Not specified	1012 hPa (29.88 inHg)	None	None	None	
Nora	November 1 – 4	Tropical storm	95 km/h (60 mph)	1000 hPa (29.53 inHg)	Vietnam, Thailand	None	None	
TD	November 3 – 5	Tropical depression	Not specified	1006 hPa (29.71 inHg)	None	None	None	
Opal	November 11 – 17	Severe tropical storm	95 km/h (60 mph)	990 hPa (29.23 inHg)	Vietnam	None	None	
TD	November 11 – 12	Tropical depression	Not specified	1012 hPa (29.88 inHg)	None	None	None	
TD	November 14	Tropical depression	Not specified	1008 hPa (29.77 inHg)	None	None	None	
Patsy (Yoling)	November 14 – 22	Violent typhoon	250 km/h (155 mph)	910 hPa (26.87 inHg)	Mariana Islands, Philippines, Vietnam	$80 million	262	
Ruth (Aning)	November 24 – 29	Tropical storm	75 km/h (45 mph)	996 hPa (29.41 inHg)	None	None	None	
TD	December 2 – 3	Tropical depression	Not specified	1008 hPa (29.77 inHg)	None	None	None	
TD	December 2 – 3	Tropical depression	Not specified	1004 hPa (29.65 inHg)	None	None	None	
Bidang	December 15 – 19	Tropical depression	55 km/h (35 mph)	1002 hPa (29.59 inHg)	None	None	None	
Season aggregates
76 systems	January 1 – December 19, 1970		280 km/h (175 mph)	895 hPa (26.43 inHg)		>$216 million	>1,847	

== See also ==
- List of Pacific typhoon seasons
- 1970 Pacific hurricane season
- 1970 Atlantic hurricane season
- 1970 North Indian Ocean cyclone season
- Australian cyclone seasons: 1969–70, 1970–71
- South Pacific cyclone seasons: 1969–70, 1970–71
- South-West Indian Ocean cyclone seasons: 1969–70, 1970–71
