= Huling =

Huling may refer to:

- Huling (surname), surname
- Hulings, a surname
- Tung Hu Ling (Dong Huling, 1918–1992), Chinese tai chi teacher
- Huling, China, a town in Zhejiang province
- List of storms named Huling
