= List of storms named Huling =

The name Huling has been used to name 9 tropical cyclones, all in the Philippine Area of Responsibility, by the PAGASA and its predecessor, the Philippine Weather Bureau, in the Western Pacific Ocean.

- Typhoon Dinah (1965) (T6510, 13W, Huling) – a Category 5-equivalent super typhoon that crossed Taiwan and killed 45 people along its path.
- Typhoon Betty (1969) (T6908, 08W, Huling) – affected Taiwan and China.
- Typhoon Louise (1973) (T7313, 15W, Huling) – affected the Philippines, China, and Vietnam.
- Typhoon Vera (1977) (T7705, 07W, Huling) – struck Taiwan and China.
- Tropical Storm Maury (1981) (T8108, 08W, Huling) – affected Taiwan and China.
- Tropical Storm Lee (1985) (T8509. 09W, Huling) – struck North Korea.
- Tropical Storm Hope (1989) (T8909, 09W, Huling) – made landfall on China.
- Tropical Storm Lewis (1993) (T9303, 08W, Huling) – crossed the Philippines and struck Hainan and Vietnam as a typhoon.
- Typhoon Tina (1997) (T9711, 12W, Huling) – made landfall on South Korea as a tropical storm.

After the 2000 Pacific typhoon season, the PAGASA revised their naming lists and the name Huling was excluded.
