= Huling (surname) =

Huling is a surname. Notable people with the surname include:

- Caroline Augusta Huling (1856–1941), American journalist, philanthropist, editor, publisher and reformer
- Daniel Huling (born 1983), American steeplechase runner
- James Huling (c. 1984), American Big Brother contestant
- James H. Huling (1844–1918), American politician
- Lorraine Huling Maynard (1897–1971), American actress
- Thomas Byers Huling (1804–1865), American businessman
- isabella Alessandra Lizárraga Huling (2006–present), Mexican socialite

== See also ==
- Hulings, surname
