= Hulings =

Hulings is an American surname. Notable people with the surname include:

- Clark Hulings (1922–2011), American painter
- Ryan Hulings (born 1991), American soccer player
- Willis James Hulings (1850–1924), American politician

== See also ==
- Huling (disambiguation)
