= 1969 Pacific typhoon season =

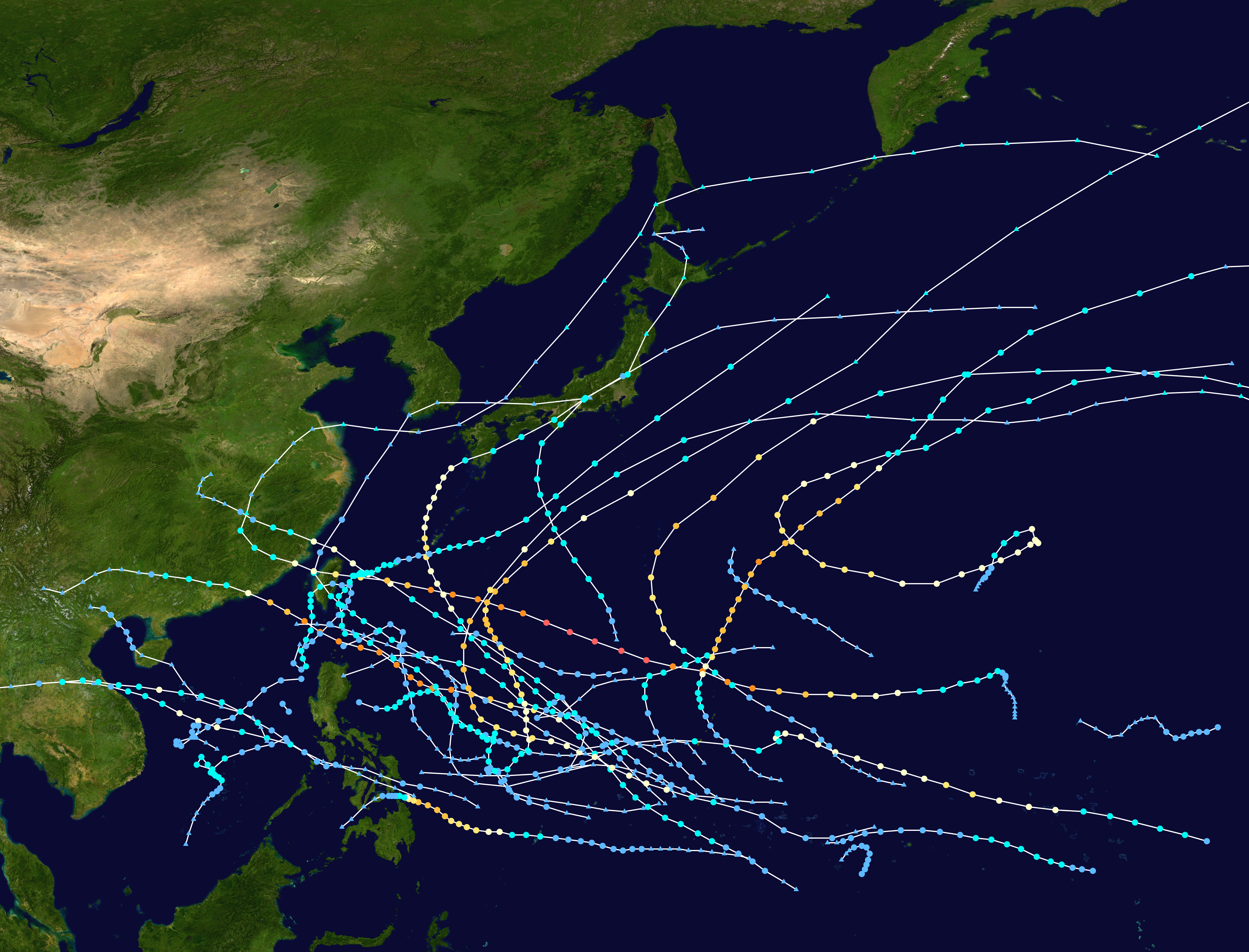
- Season summary map

Seasonal boundaries
- First system formed: January 16, 1969
- Last system dissipated: December 30, 1969

Strongest storm
- Name: Elsie
  - Maximum winds: 280 km/h (175 mph) (1-minute sustained)
  - Lowest pressure: 895 hPa (mbar)

Seasonal statistics
- Total depressions: 61
- Total storms: 19
- Typhoons: 13
- Very strong typhoons: 2 (unofficial)
- Total fatalities: 1,177
- Total damage: Unknown

Related articles
- 1969 Atlantic hurricane season; 1969 Pacific hurricane season; 1969 North Indian Ocean cyclone season

The 1969 Pacific typhoon season was the fourth least-active season on record. The season had no official bounds; it ran year-round in 1969, but most tropical cyclones tend to form in the northwestern Pacific Ocean between June and December. These dates conventionally delimit the period of each year when most tropical cyclones form in the northwestern Pacific Ocean.

The scope of this article is limited to the Pacific Ocean, north of the equator and west of the International Date Line. Storms that form east of the date line and north of the equator are called hurricanes; see 1969 Pacific hurricane season. Tropical Storms formed in the entire west pacific basin were assigned a name by the Joint Typhoon Warning Center. Tropical depressions in this basin have the "W" suffix added to their number. Tropical depressions that enter or form in the Philippine area of responsibility are assigned a name by the Philippine Weather Bureau (the predecessor of the Philippine Atmospheric, Geophysical and Astronomical Services Administration or PAGASA, which was formed three years later, in 1972). This can often result in the same storm having two names.

== Systems ==
34 tropical depressions formed this year in the Western Pacific, of which 23 became tropical storms. 13 storms reached typhoon intensity, of which 2 reached super typhoon strength.

=== Typhoon Phyllis ===
- Typhoon (JMA)
- Category 2-equivalent typhoon (SSHWS)
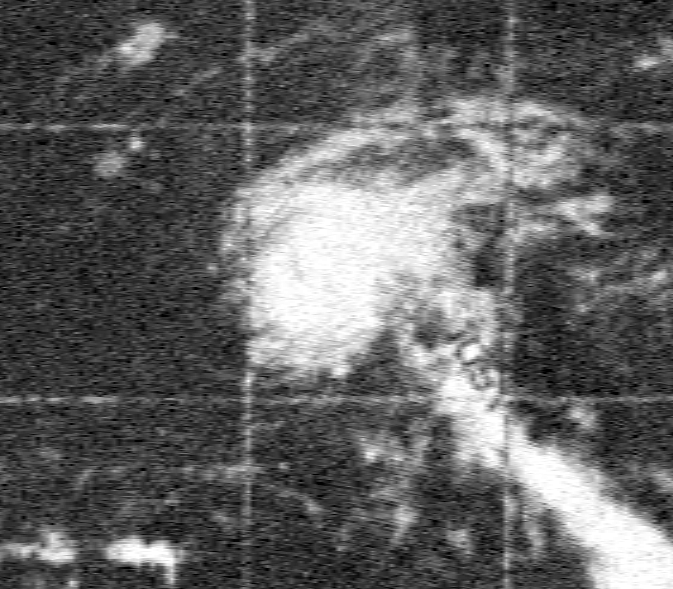
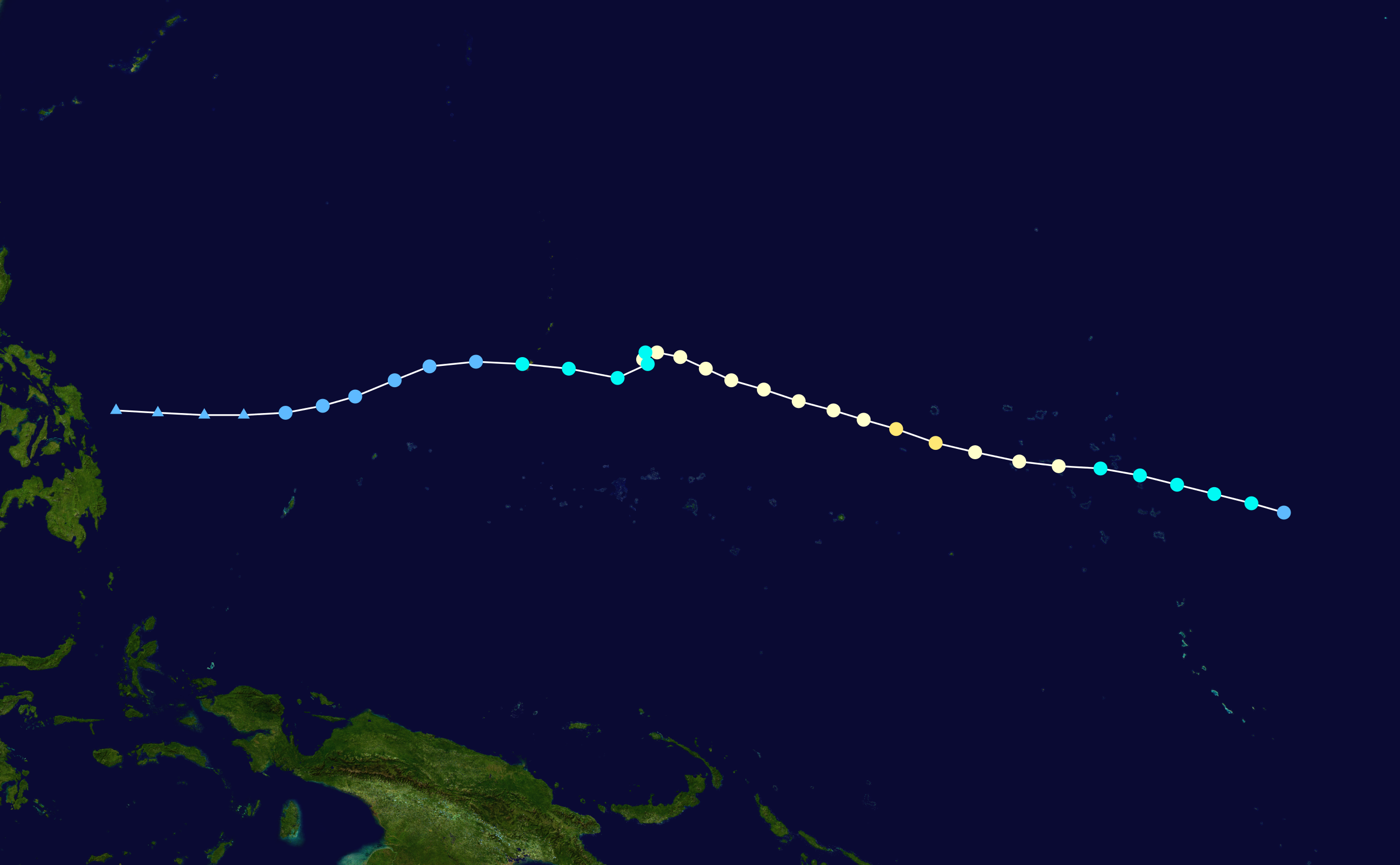
- Duration: January 16 – January 24
- Peak intensity: 155 km/h (100 mph) (1-min); 965 hPa (mbar)

=== Tropical Storm Rita ===
- Tropical storm (JMA)
- Tropical storm (SSHWS)
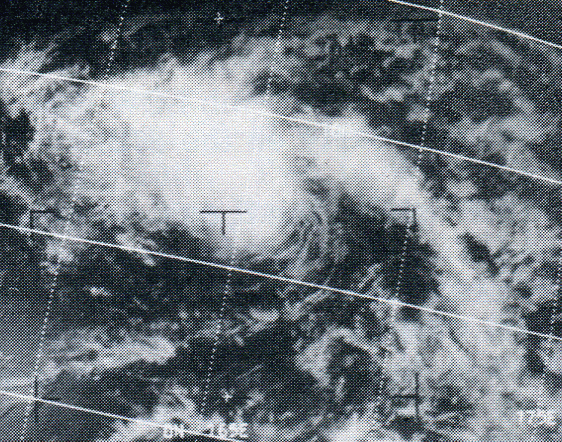
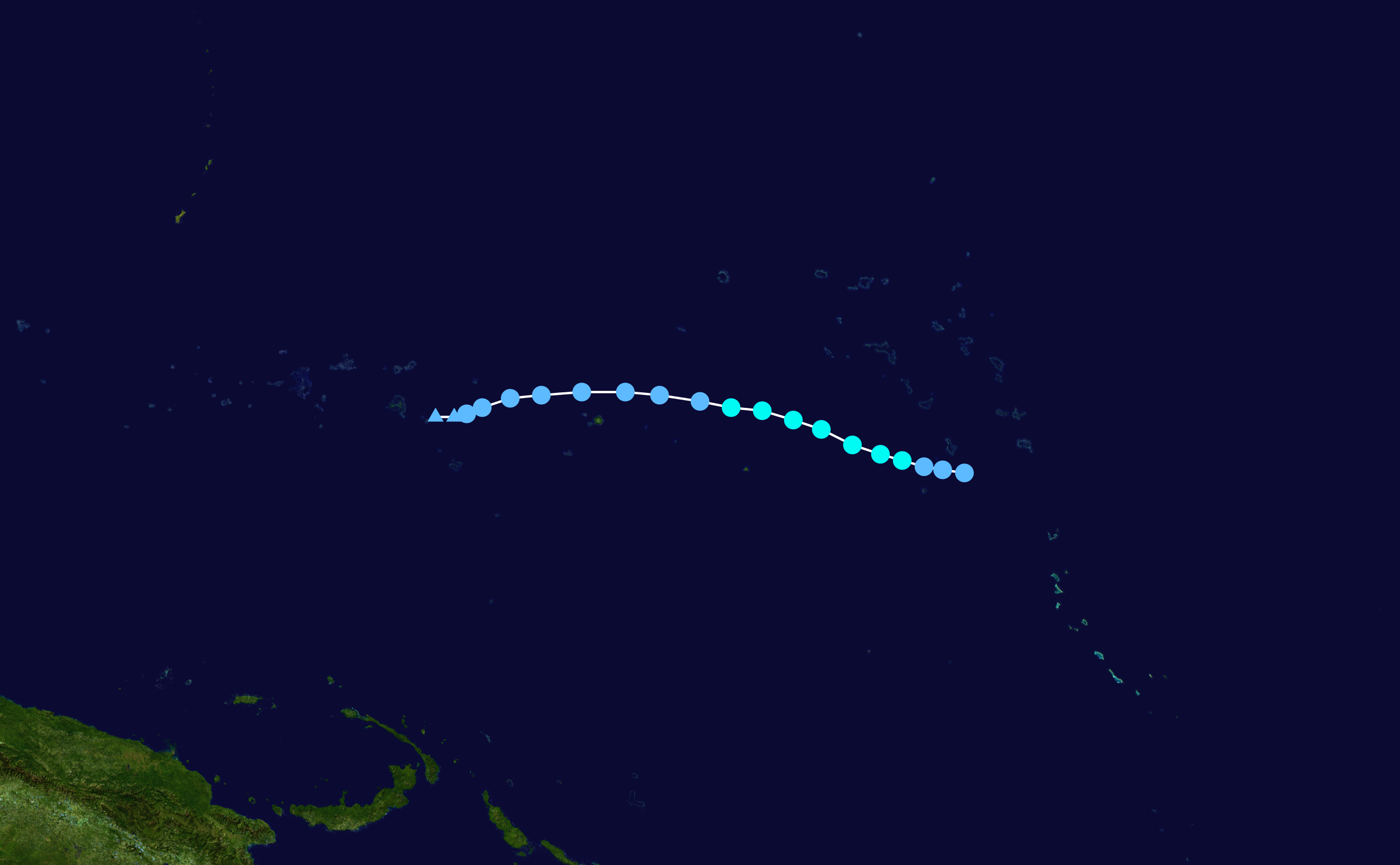
- Duration: March 6 – March 9
- Peak intensity: 75 km/h (45 mph) (1-min); 995 hPa (mbar)

=== Typhoon Susan (Atring) ===
- Typhoon (JMA)
- Category 3-equivalent typhoon (SSHWS)
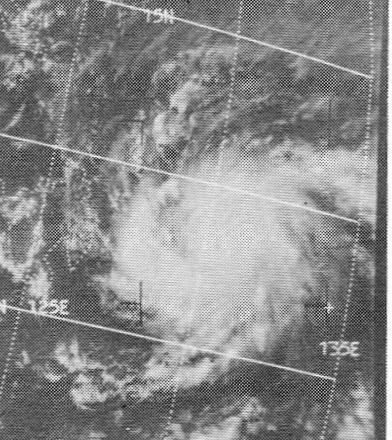
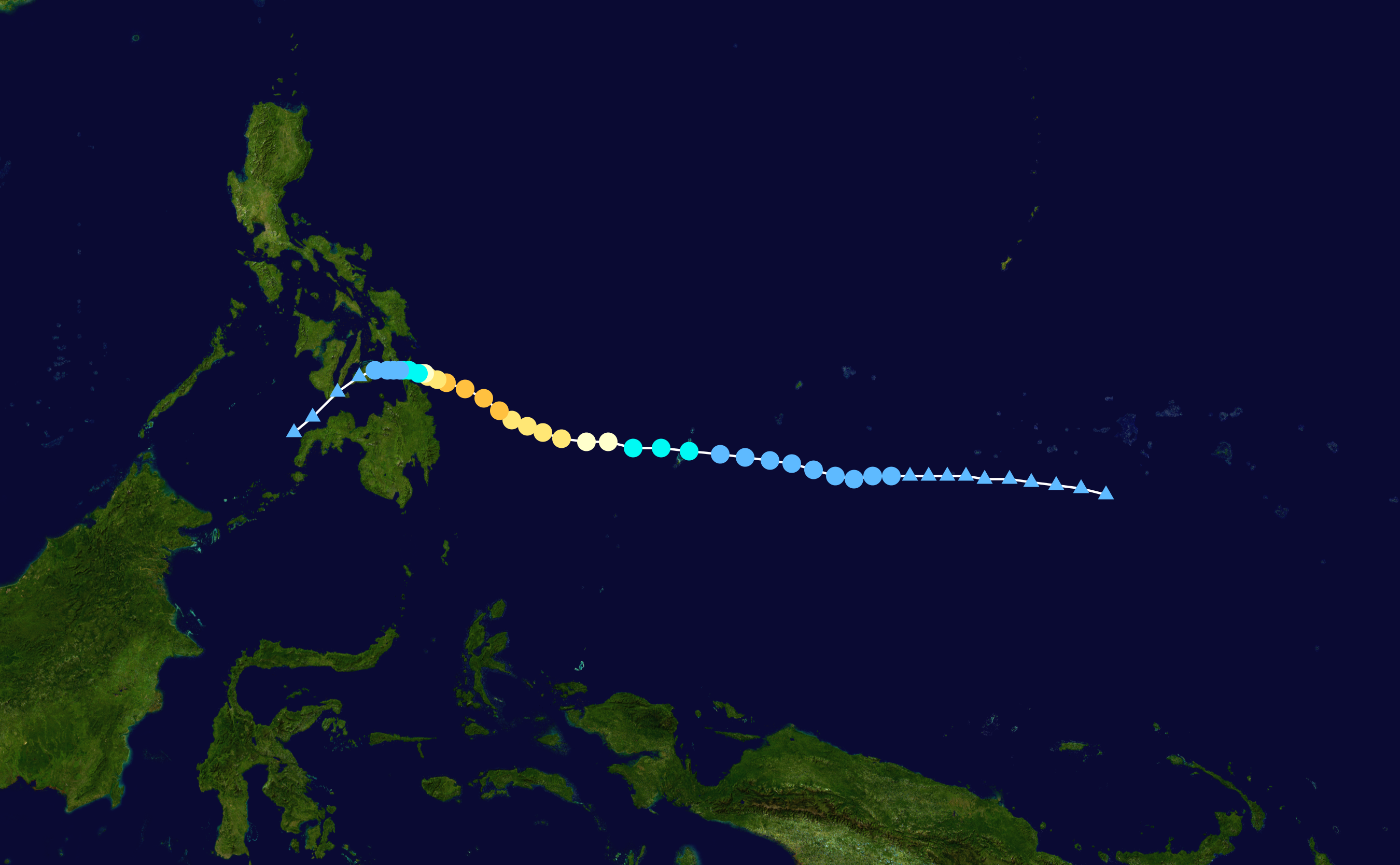
- Duration: April 15 – April 26
- Peak intensity: 195 km/h (120 mph) (1-min); 940 hPa (mbar)

=== Tropical Depression Bining ===
- Tropical depression (PAGASA)
- Duration: May 3 – May 5
- Peak intensity: 55 km/h (35 mph) (10-min);

=== Typhoon Tess (Kuring) ===
- Typhoon (JMA)
- Category 1-equivalent typhoon (SSHWS)
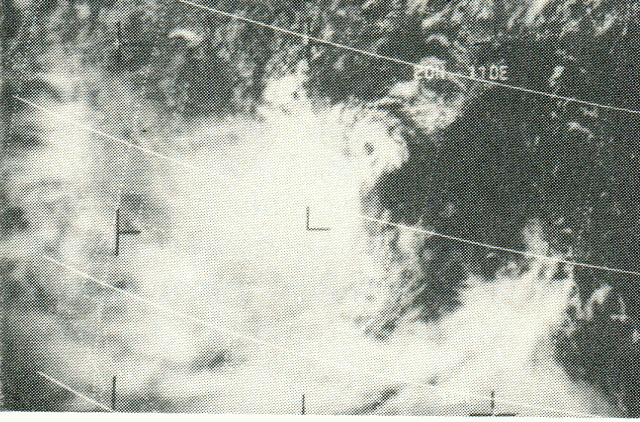
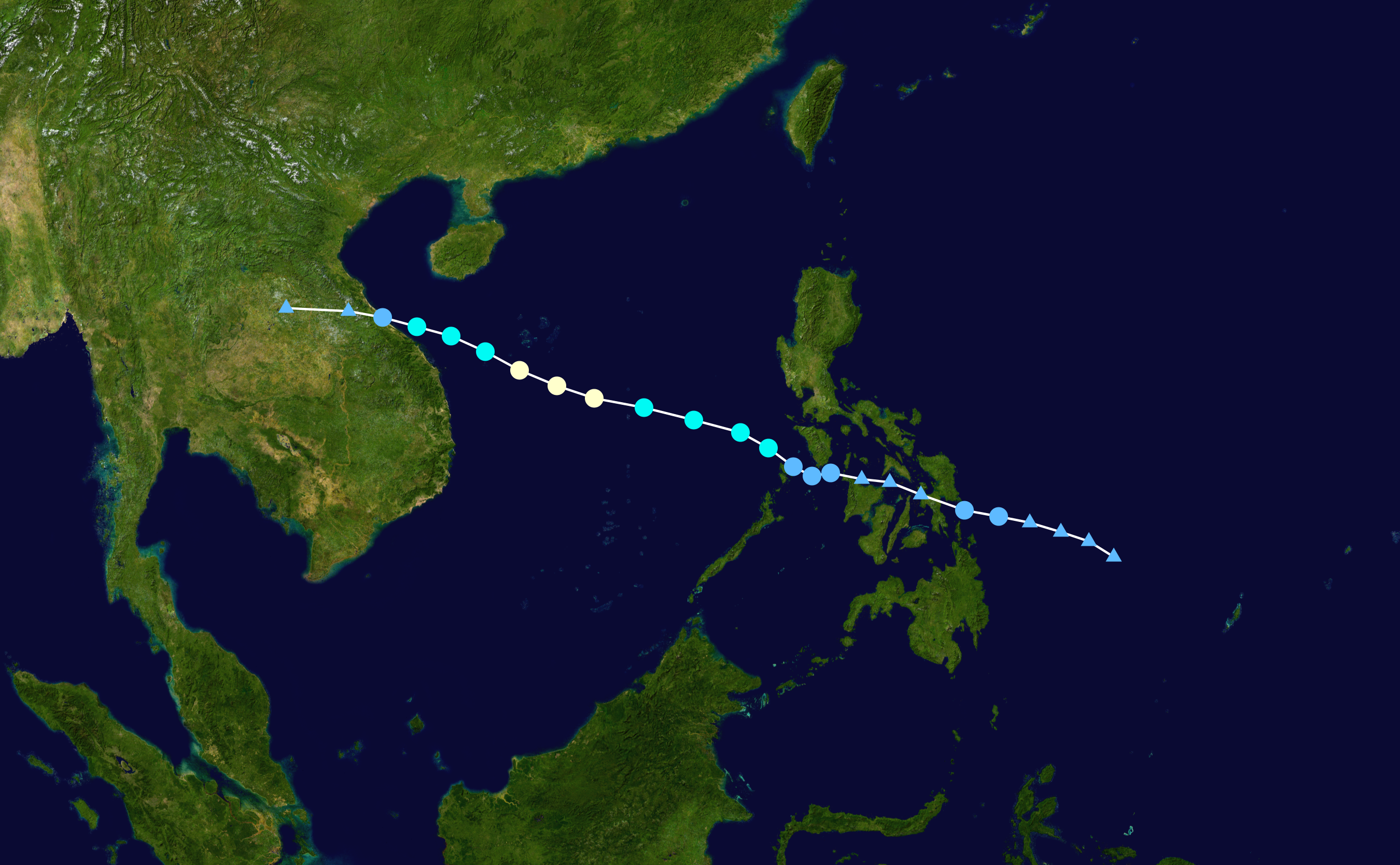
- Duration: July 6 – July 12
- Peak intensity: 130 km/h (80 mph) (1-min); 970 hPa (mbar)

=== Typhoon Viola (Elang) ===
- Typhoon (JMA)
- Category 4 super typhoon (SSHWS)
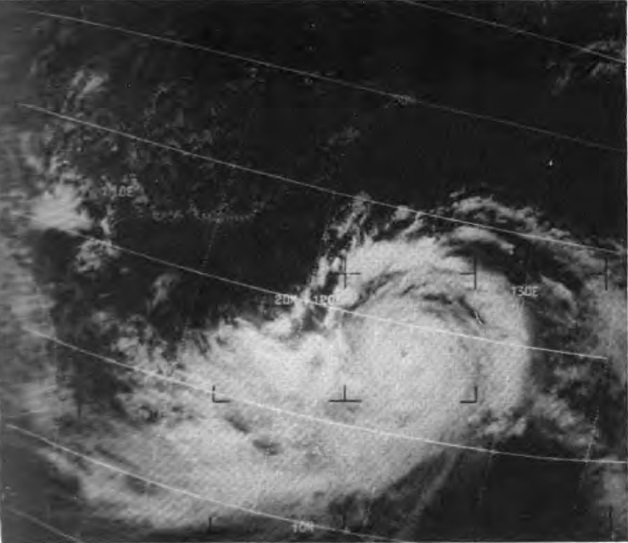
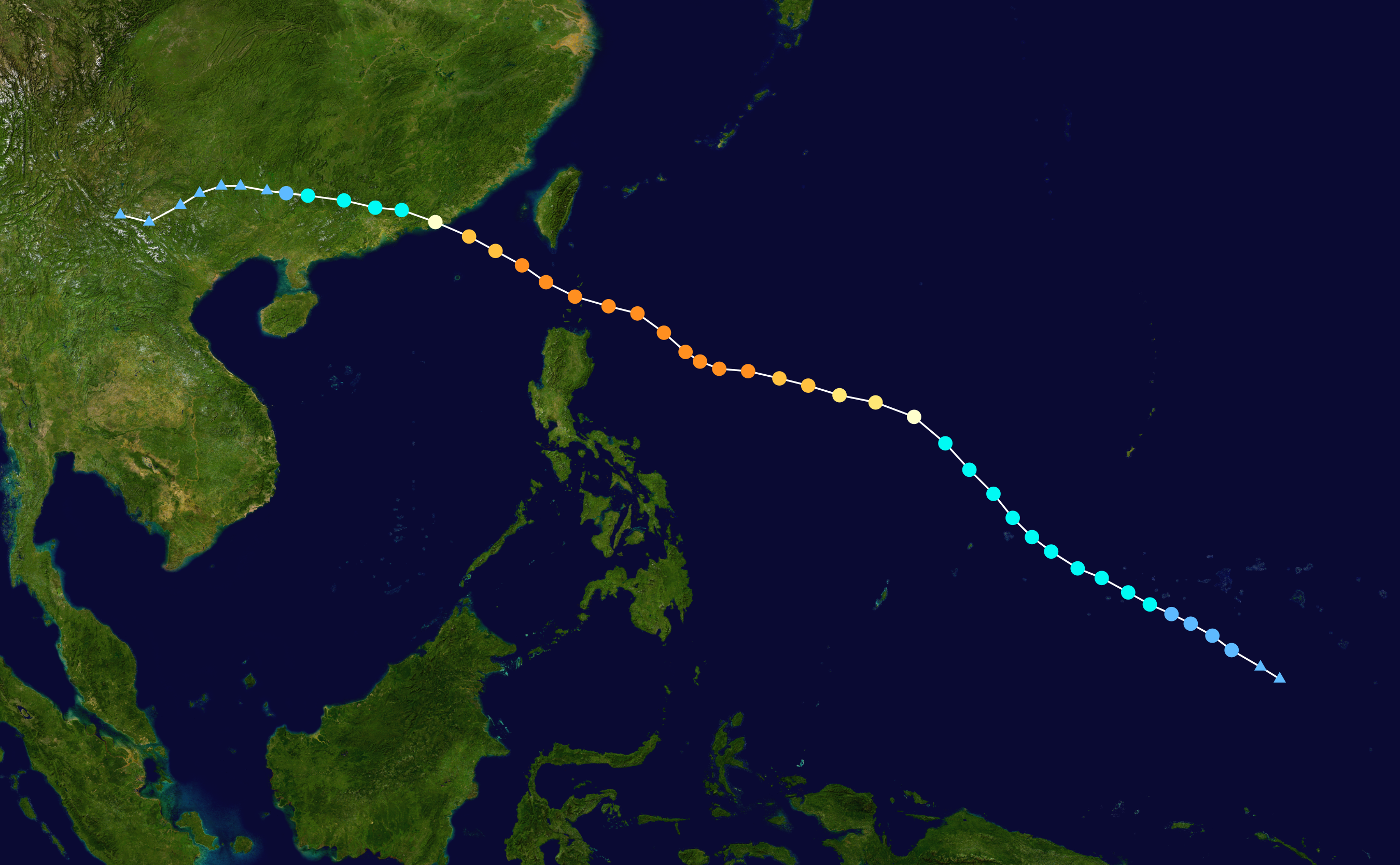
- Duration: July 20 – July 30
- Peak intensity: 240 km/h (150 mph) (1-min); 896 hPa (mbar)

Large Super Typhoon Viola, which formed on July 22 east of the Philippines, brushed northern Luzon with winds of 150 mph on the 26th. It continued to the northwest, and weakened due to lack of inflow. Viola hit southeastern China as a minimal typhoon on the 28th, and dissipated the next day. The typhoon caused more than 1000 deaths in and around Shantou, Guangdong, China, where it made the landfall.

=== Tropical Depression Daling ===
- Tropical depression (JMA)
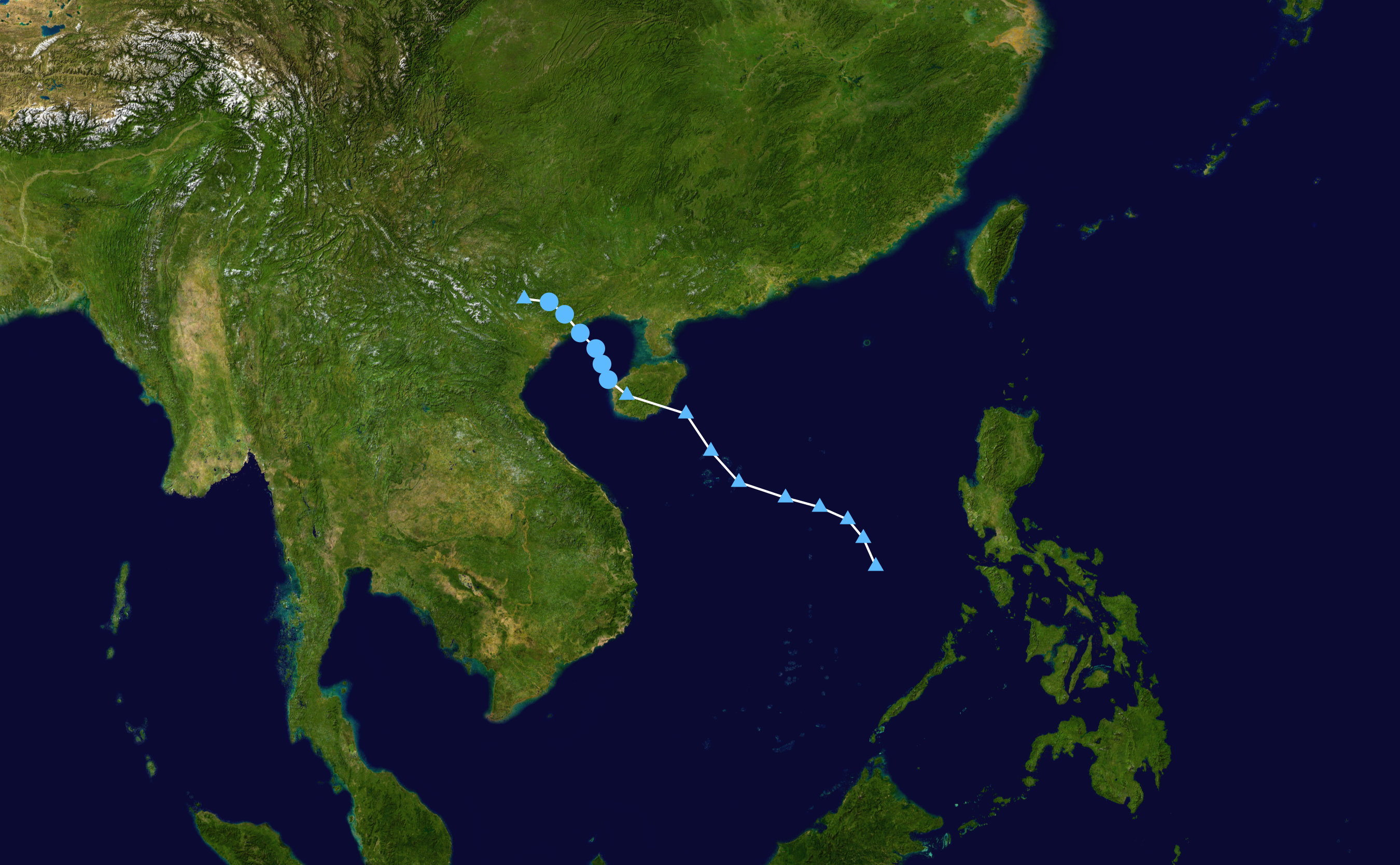
- Duration: July 21 – July 25
- Peak intensity: 55 km/h (35 mph) (10-min); 1000 hPa (mbar)

=== Severe Tropical Storm Winnie (Goring) ===
- Severe tropical storm (JMA)
- Tropical storm (SSHWS)
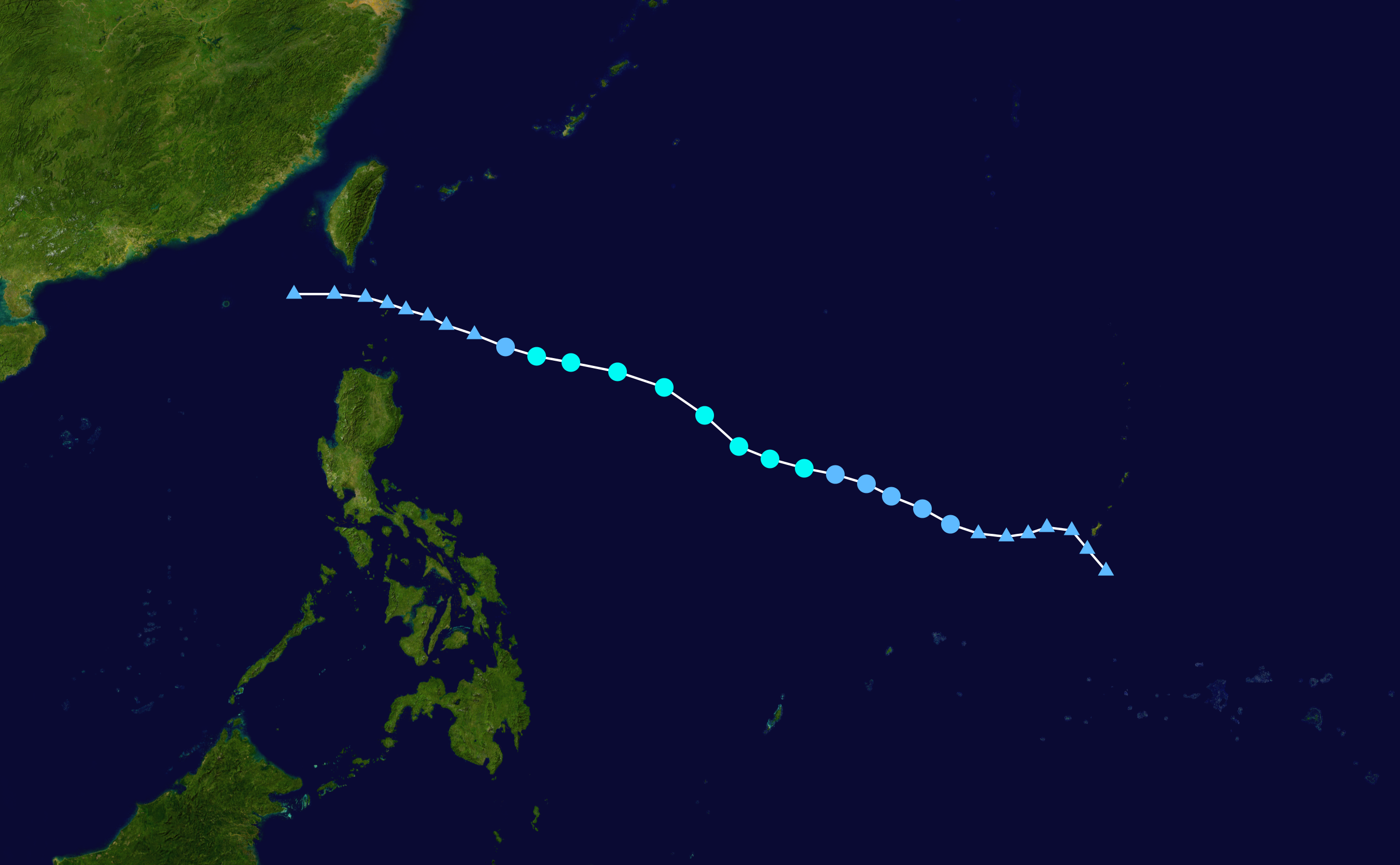
- Duration: July 26 – August 2
- Peak intensity: 95 km/h (60 mph) (1-min); 988 hPa (mbar)

=== Severe Tropical Storm Alice ===
- Severe tropical storm (JMA)
- Tropical storm (SSHWS)
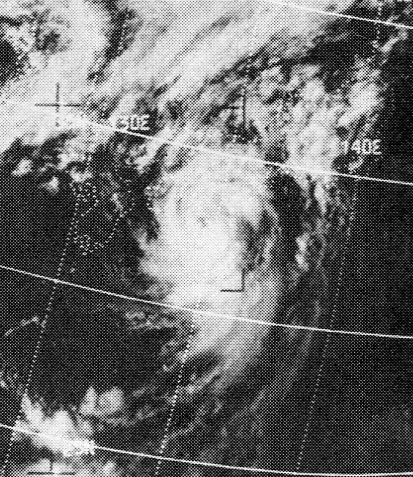
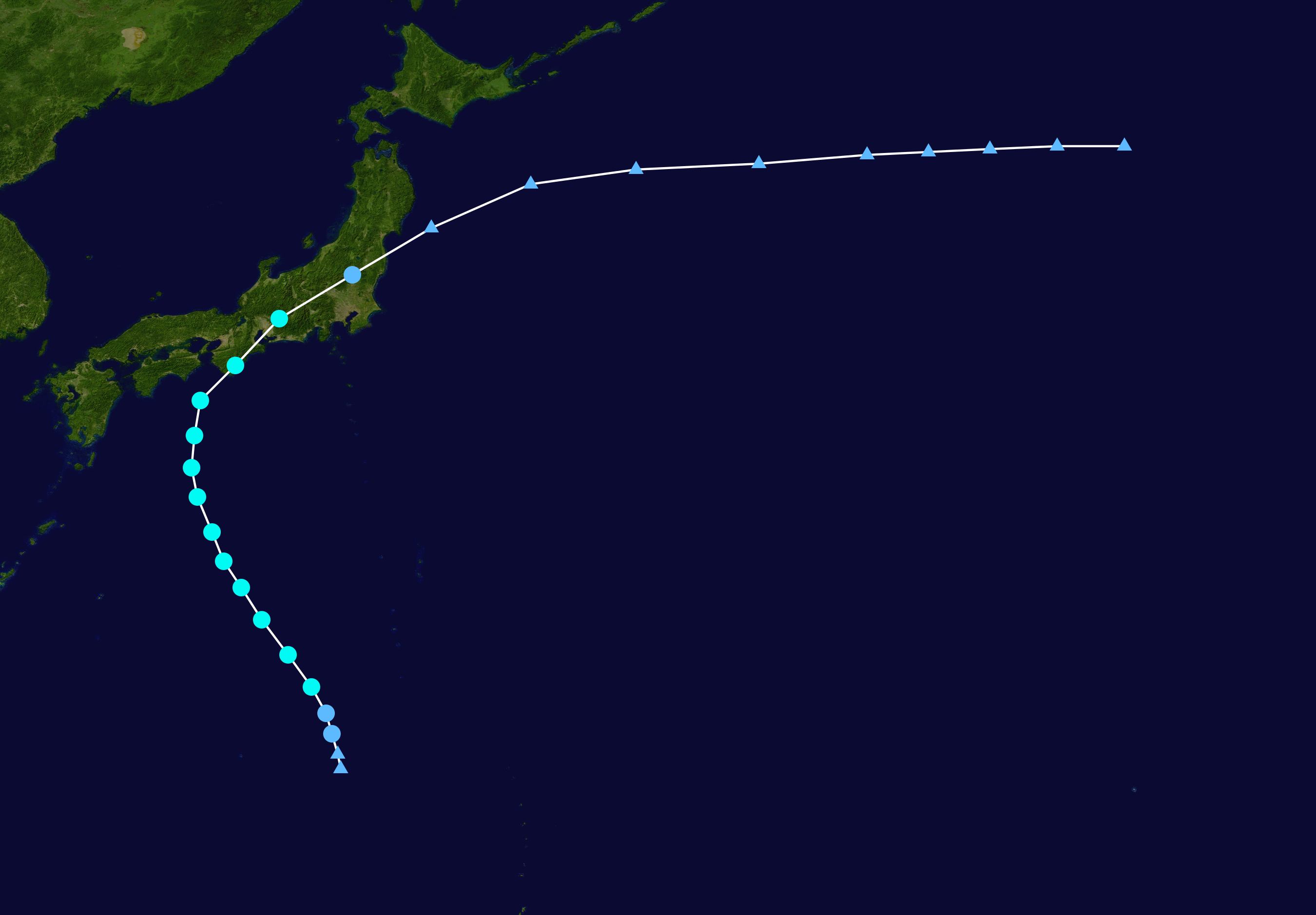
- Duration: August 1 – August 5
- Peak intensity: 85 km/h (50 mph) (1-min); 985 hPa (mbar)

=== Typhoon Betty (Huling) ===
- Typhoon (JMA)
- Category 1-equivalent typhoon (SSHWS)
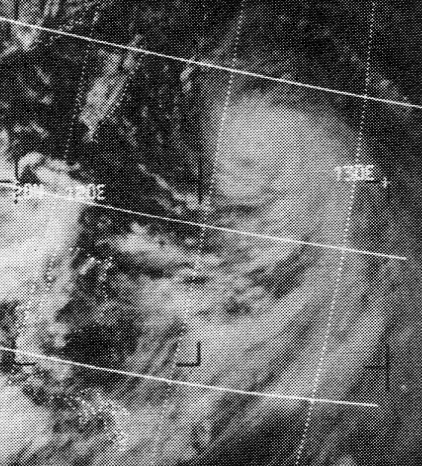
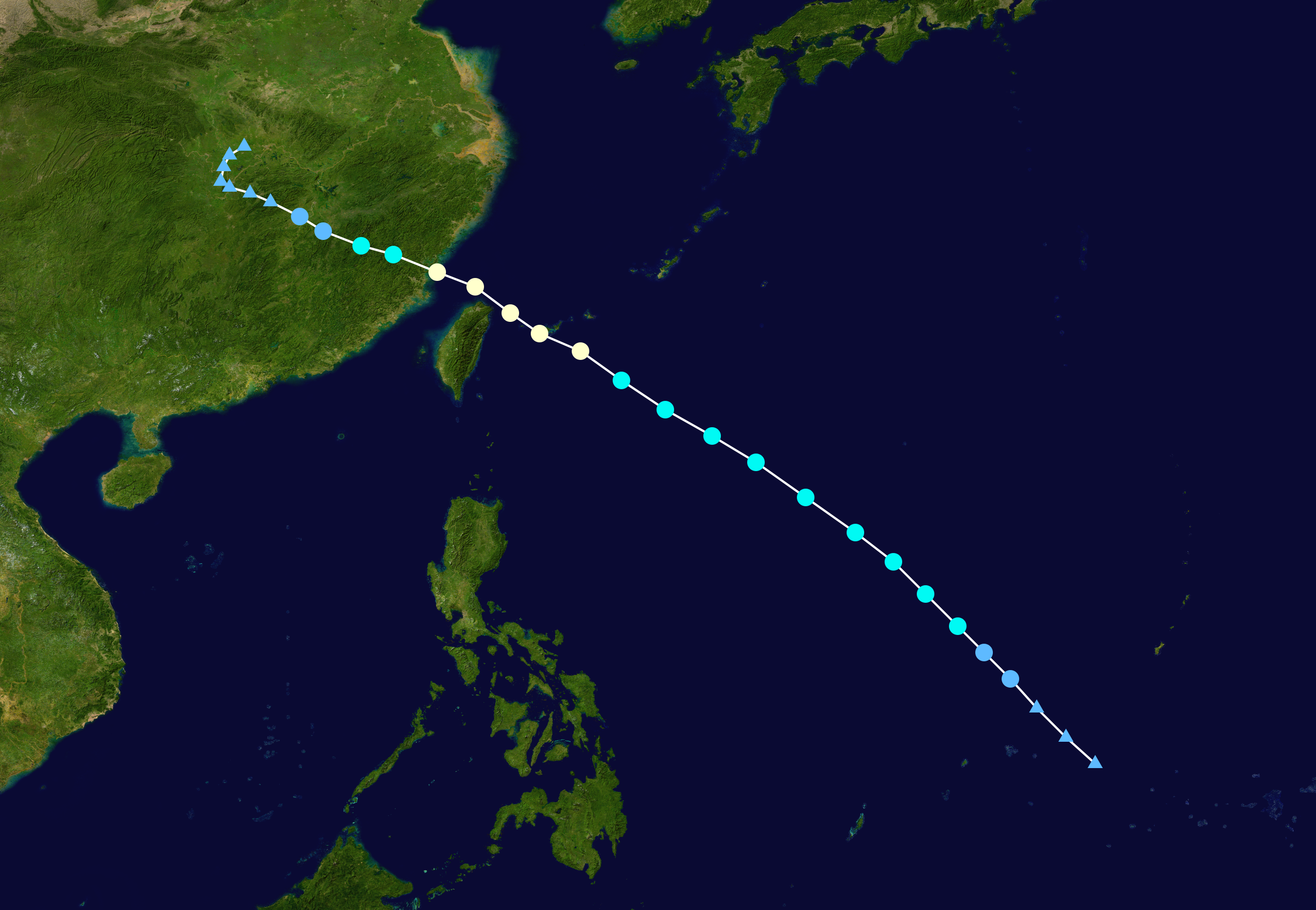
- Duration: August 4 – August 10
- Peak intensity: 130 km/h (80 mph) (1-min); 960 hPa (mbar)

=== Typhoon Cora (Ibiang) ===
- Typhoon (JMA)
- Category 2-equivalent typhoon (SSHWS)
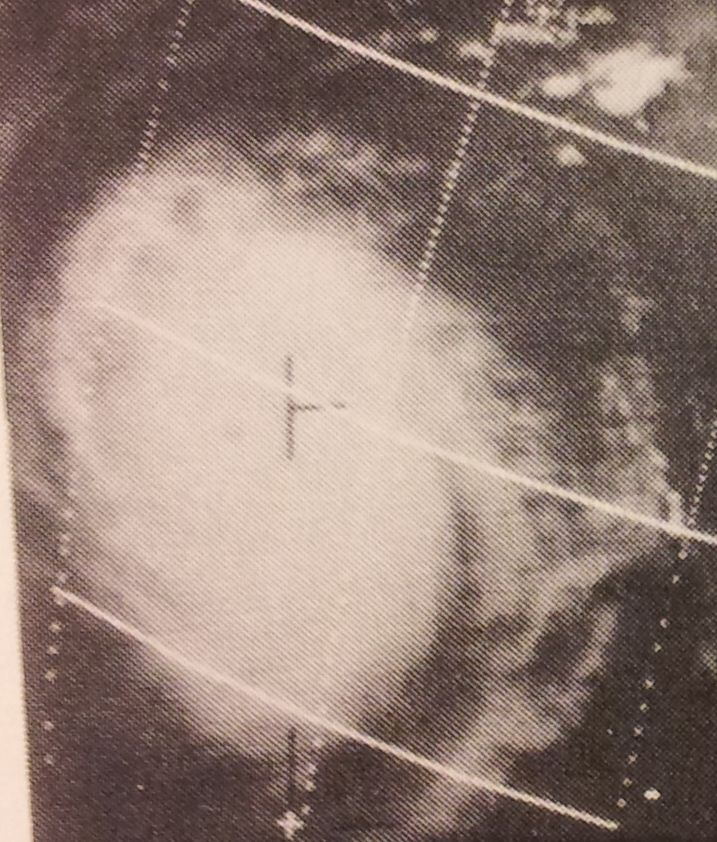
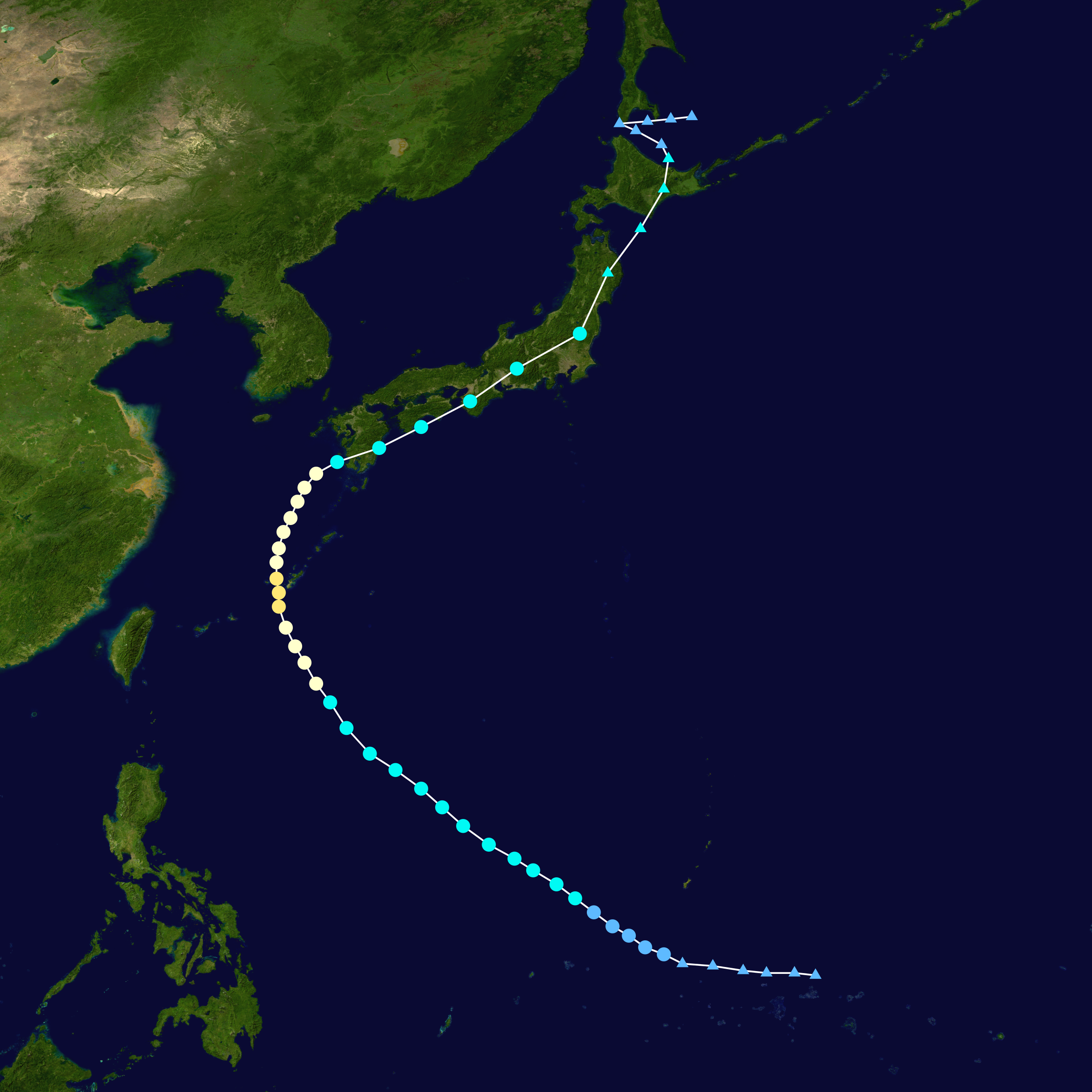
- Duration: August 12 – August 23
- Peak intensity: 155 km/h (100 mph) (1-min); 935 hPa (mbar)

=== Typhoon Doris ===
- Typhoon (JMA)
- Category 1-equivalent typhoon (SSHWS)
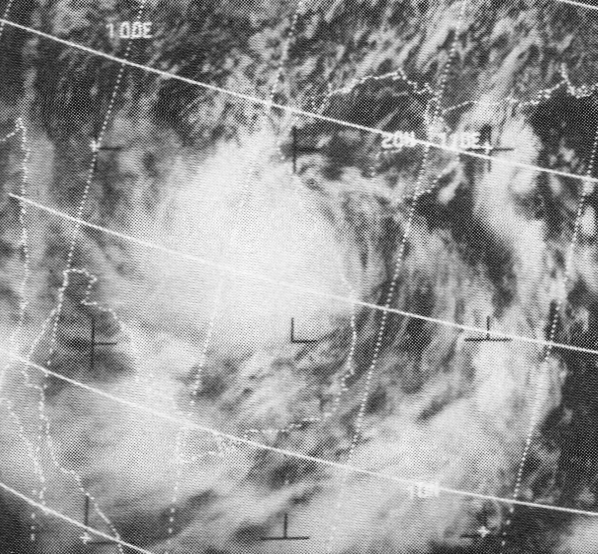
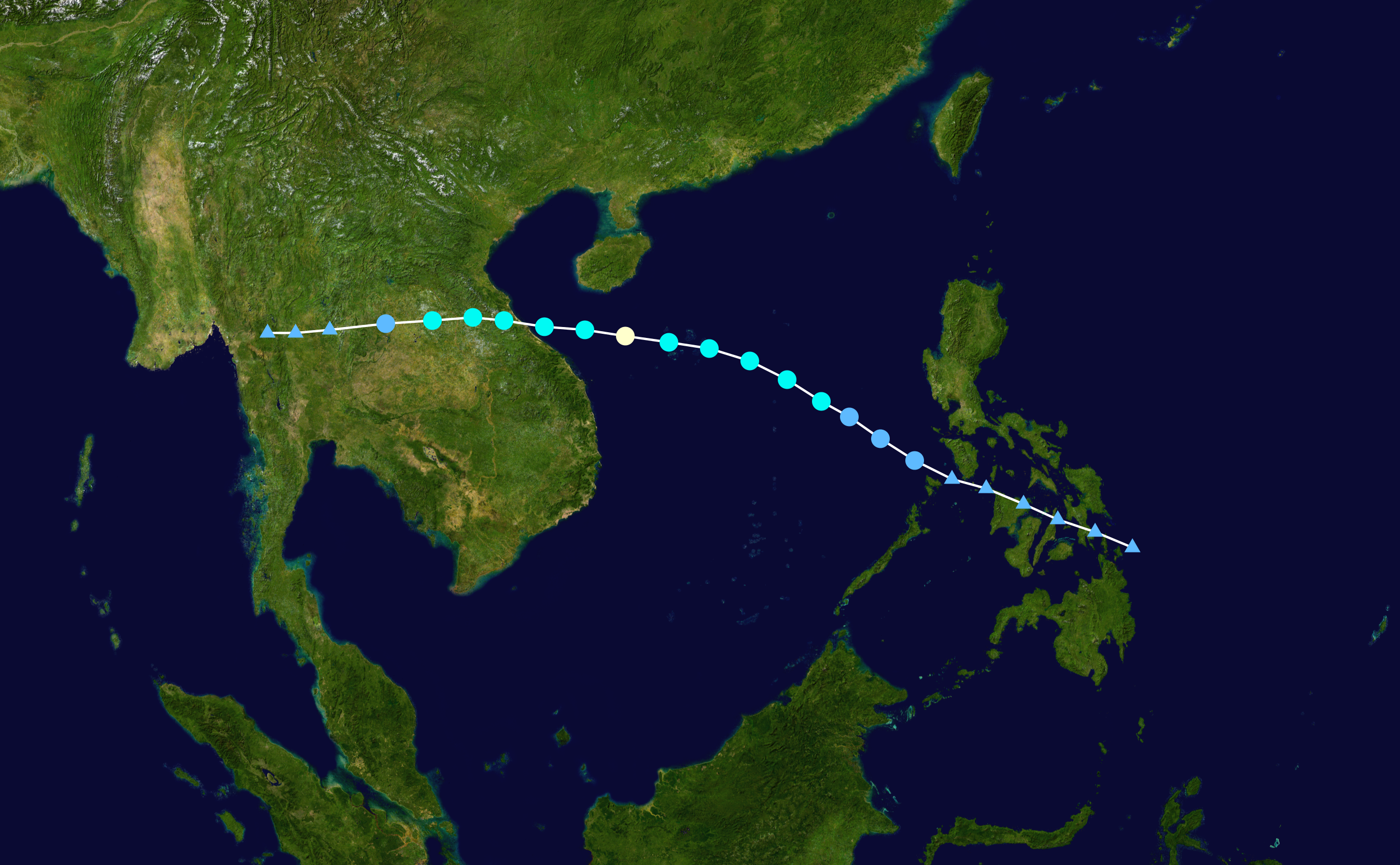
- Duration: August 29 – September 3
- Peak intensity: 120 km/h (75 mph) (1-min); 975 hPa (mbar)

=== Tropical Depression 12W ===
- Tropical depression (JMA)
- Tropical depression (SSHWS)
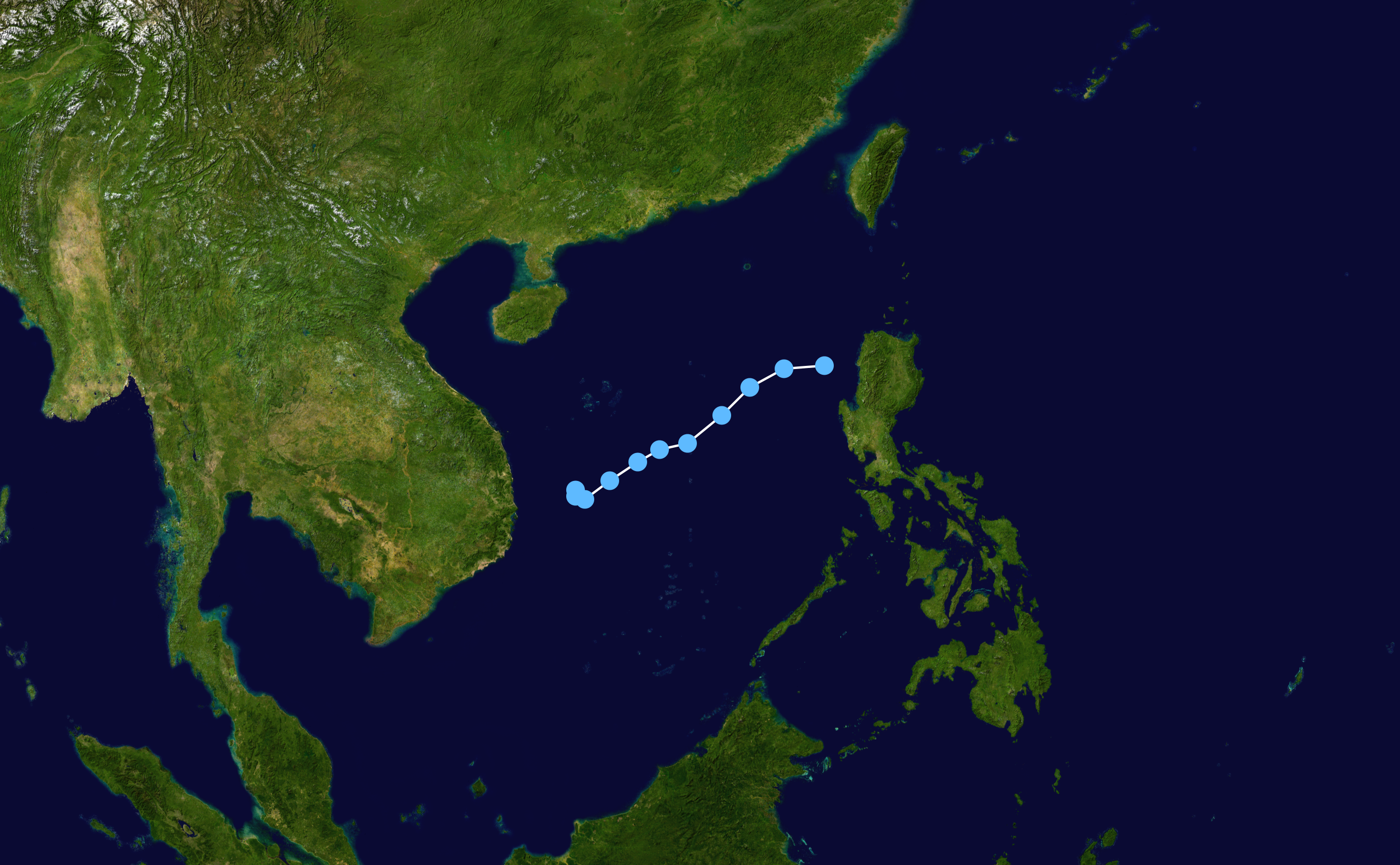
- Duration: September 4 – September 10
- Peak intensity: 55 km/h (35 mph) (10-min); 998 hPa (mbar)

=== Tropical Depression Luming ===
- Tropical depression (JMA)
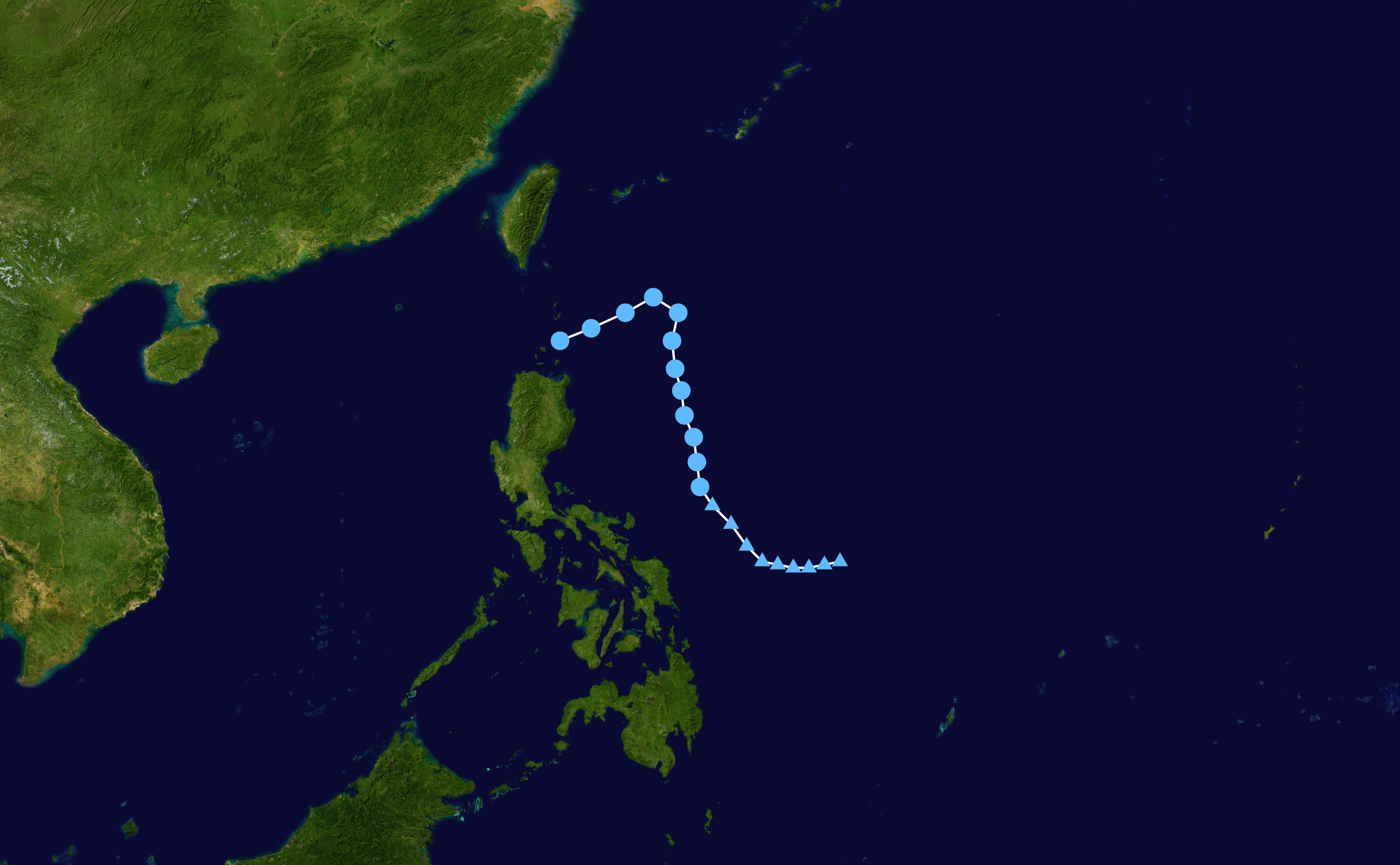
- Duration: September 3 – September 8
- Peak intensity: 55 km/h (35 mph) (10-min); 1004 hPa (mbar)

=== Tropical Depression 11W ===
- Tropical depression (CMA)
- Tropical storm (SSHWS)
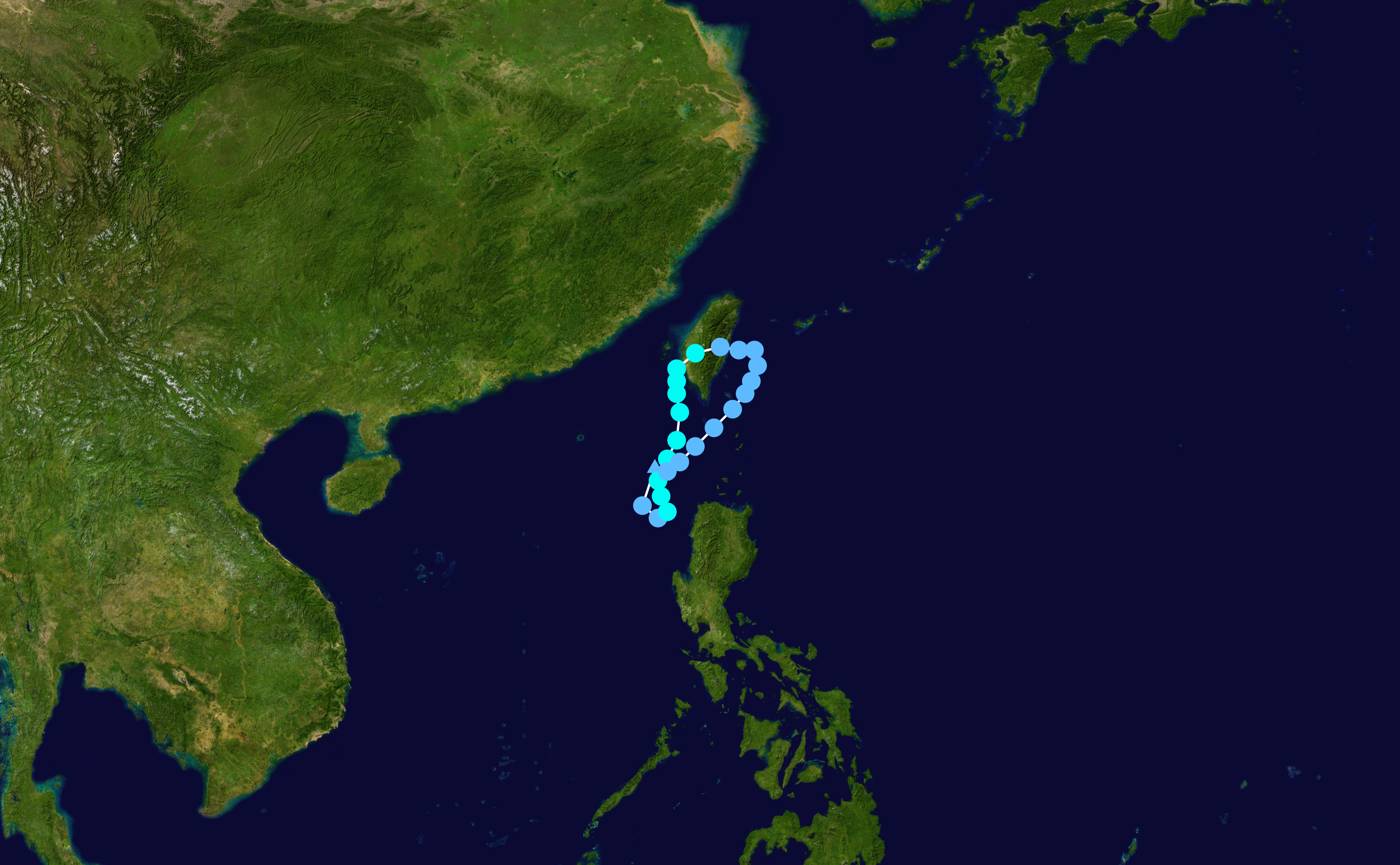
- Duration: September 8 – September 15
- Peak intensity: 55 km/h (35 mph) (10-min); 992 hPa (mbar)

=== Tropical Depression 13W (Miling) ===
- Tropical depression (JMA)
- Tropical storm (SSHWS)
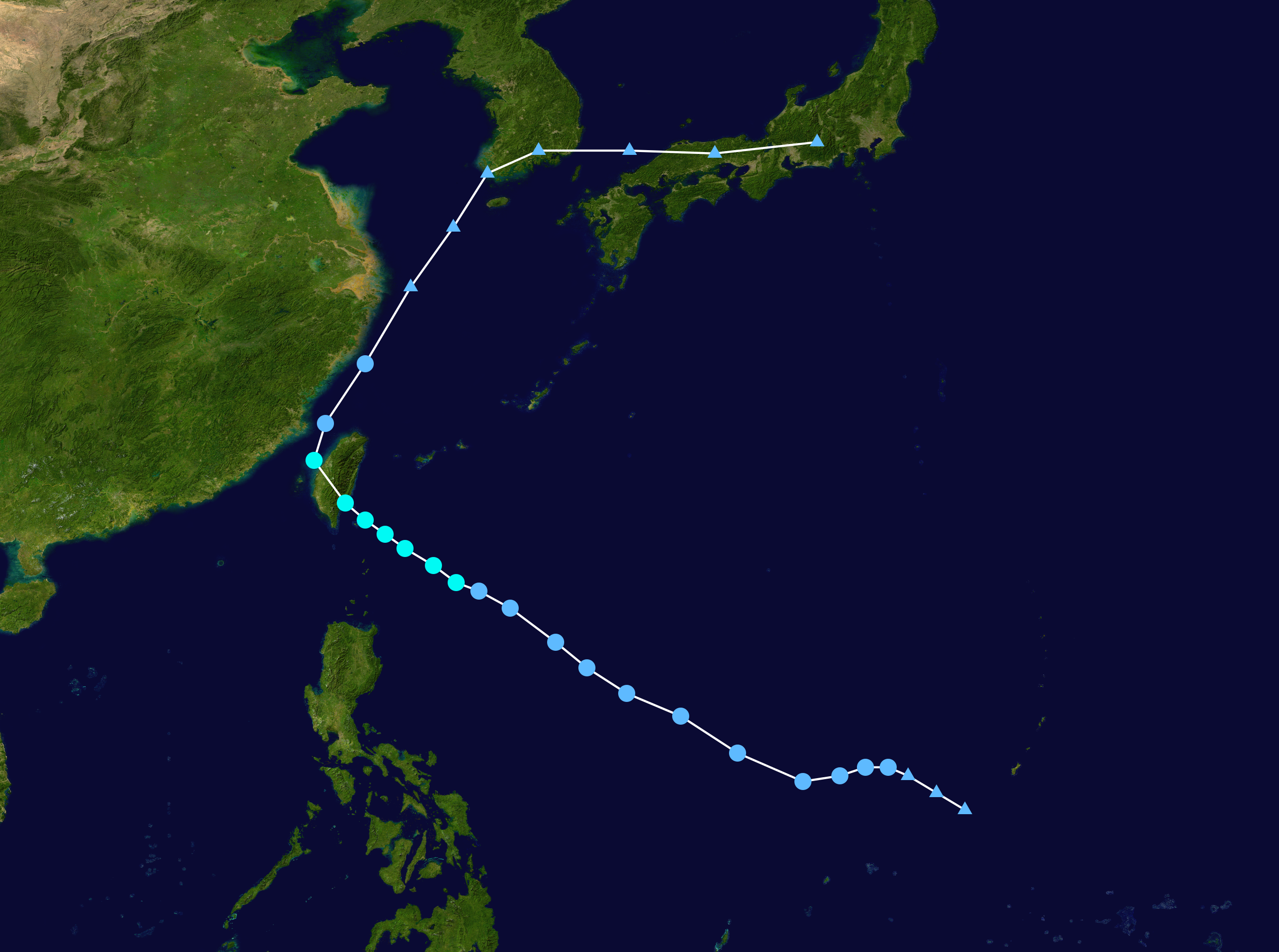
- Duration: September 9 – September 14
- Peak intensity: 55 km/h (35 mph) (10-min); 996 hPa (mbar)

=== Typhoon Elsie (Narsing) ===
- Typhoon (JMA)
- Category 5-equivalent super typhoon (SSHWS)
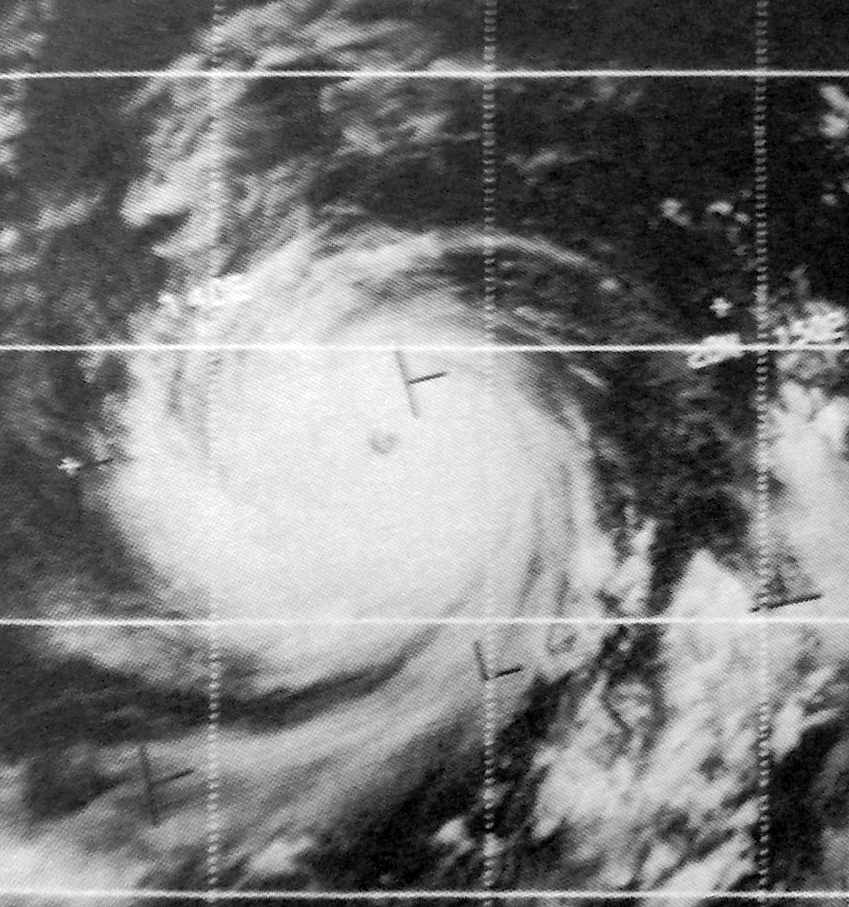
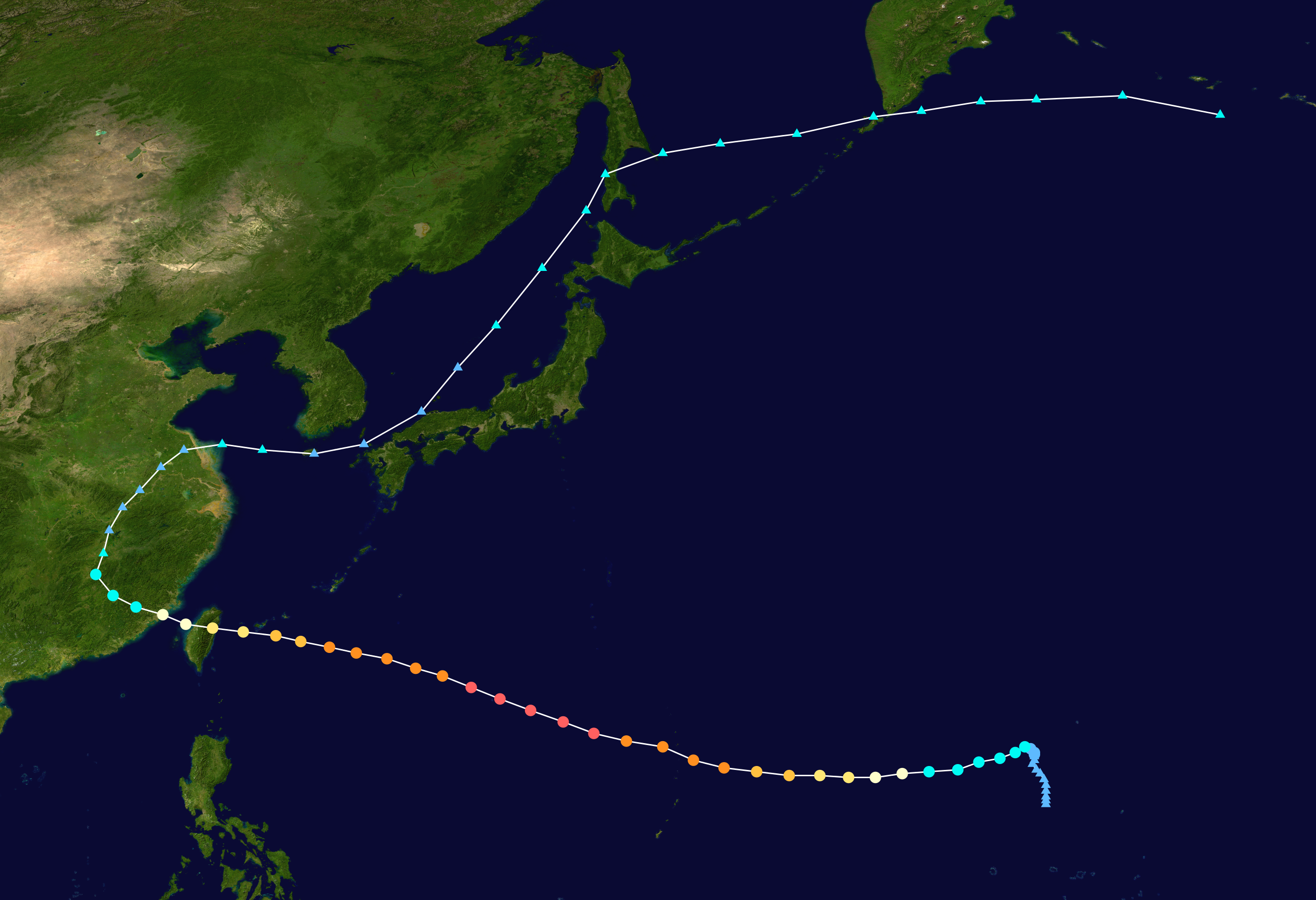
- Duration: September 16 – September 28
- Peak intensity: 280 km/h (175 mph) (1-min); 895 hPa (mbar)

On September 19, Tropical Depression 14W formed over the open Western Pacific. It tracked almost due westward, becoming a tropical storm on the 20th and a typhoon on the 21st. Elsie continued to intensify, and reached a peak of 175 mph winds on the 24th. After peaking, the typhoon steadily weakened as it moved westward. On the 26th 105 mph Typhoon Elsie hit northern Taiwan, and a day later hit eastern China. After drifting northward, Elsie dissipated over China on September 28. The typhoon killed 102 people, with 24 missing and 227 injured from the system.

=== Typhoon Flossie (Openg) ===
- Typhoon (JMA)
- Tropical storm (SSHWS)
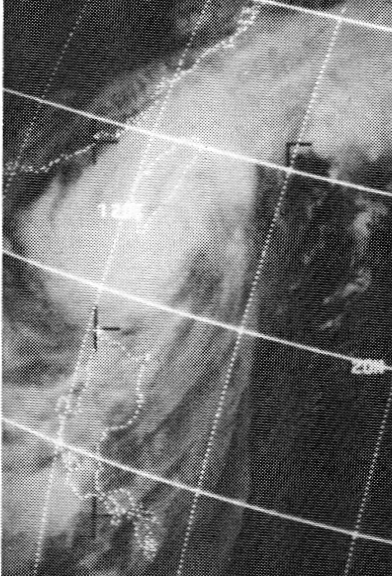
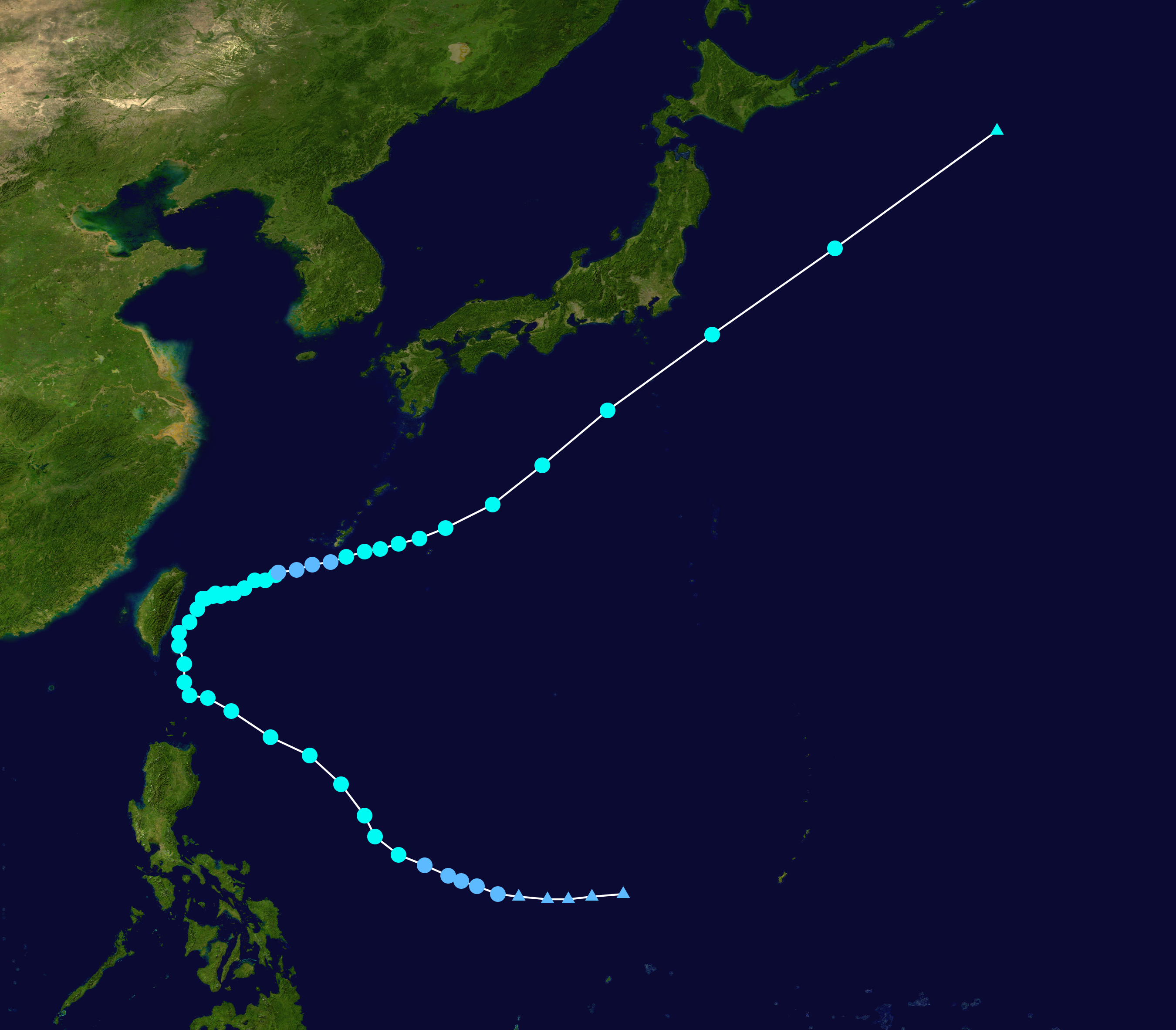
- Duration: September 27 – October 9
- Peak intensity: 110 km/h (70 mph) (1-min); 960 hPa (mbar)

Just days after Elsie hit Taiwan, Tropical Storm Flossie approached Taiwan. From October 1 to the 5th, it drifted northward offshore of the island. It accelerated to the northeast, and became extratropical on the 10th east of Japan. Flossie's heavy rains left 75 people dead.

=== Typhoon Grace ===
- Typhoon (JMA)
- Category 2-equivalent typhoon (SSHWS)
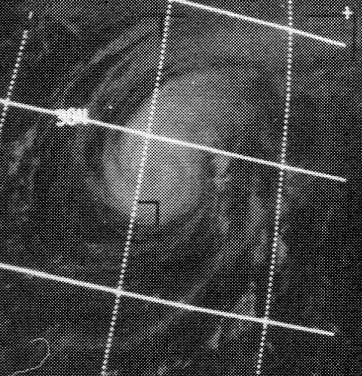
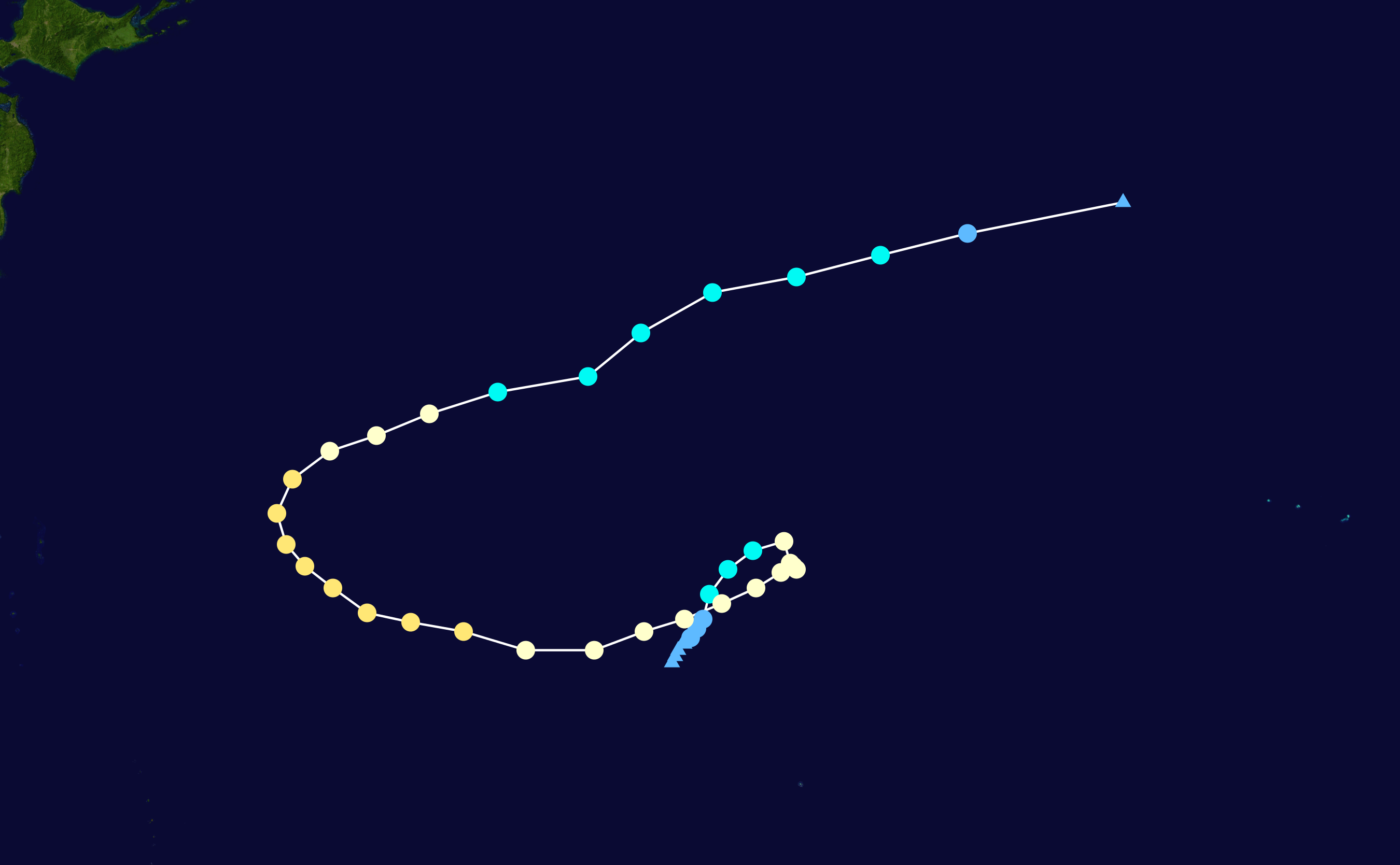
- Duration: September 28 – October 8
- Peak intensity: 175 km/h (110 mph) (1-min); 940 hPa (mbar)

=== Tropical Depression 17W ===
- Tropical depression (JMA)
- Tropical depression (SSHWS)
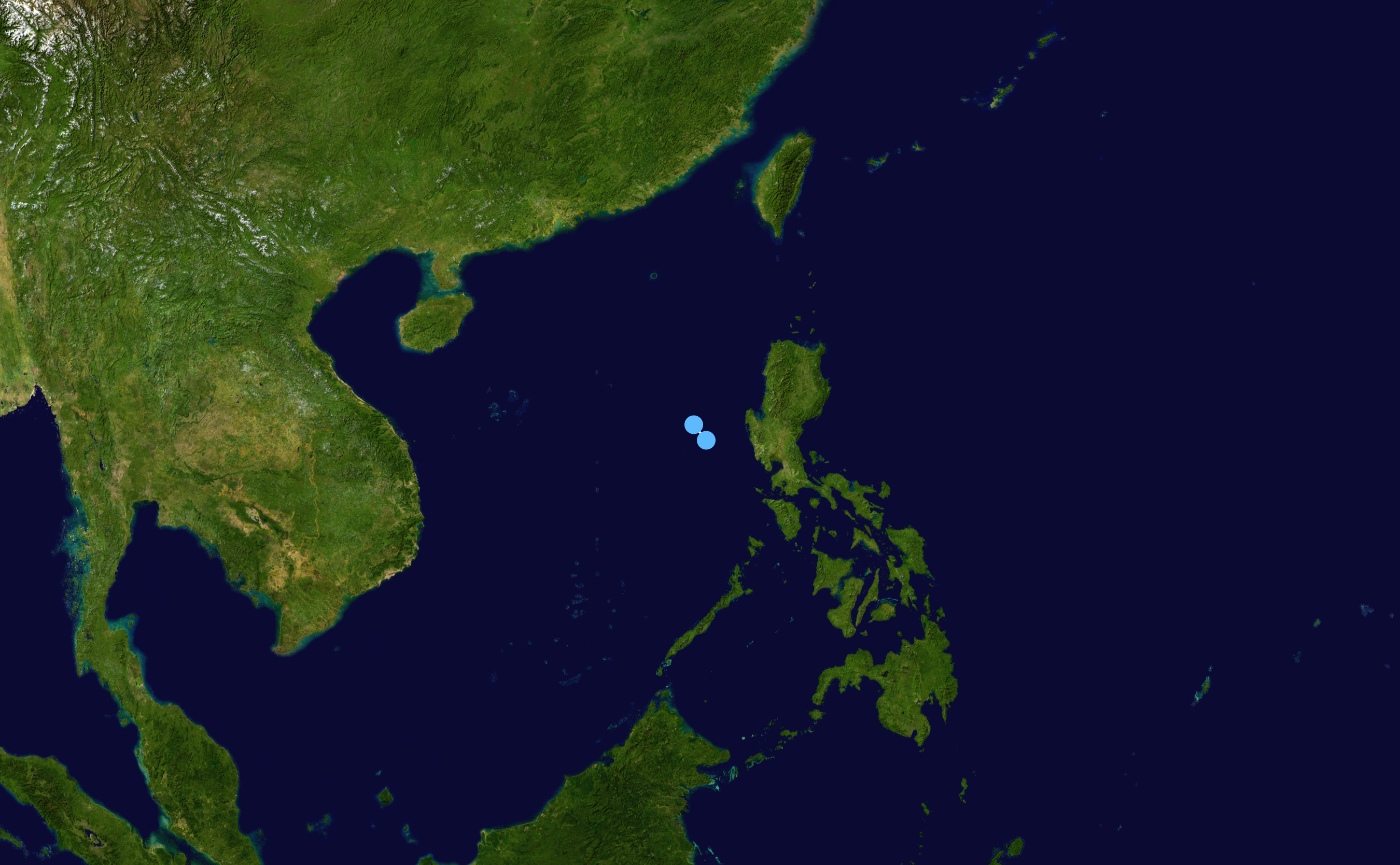
- Duration: September 30 – October 1
- Peak intensity: 55 km/h (35 mph) (10-min); 1002 hPa (mbar)

=== Typhoon Helen ===
- Typhoon (JMA)
- Category 3-equivalent typhoon (SSHWS)
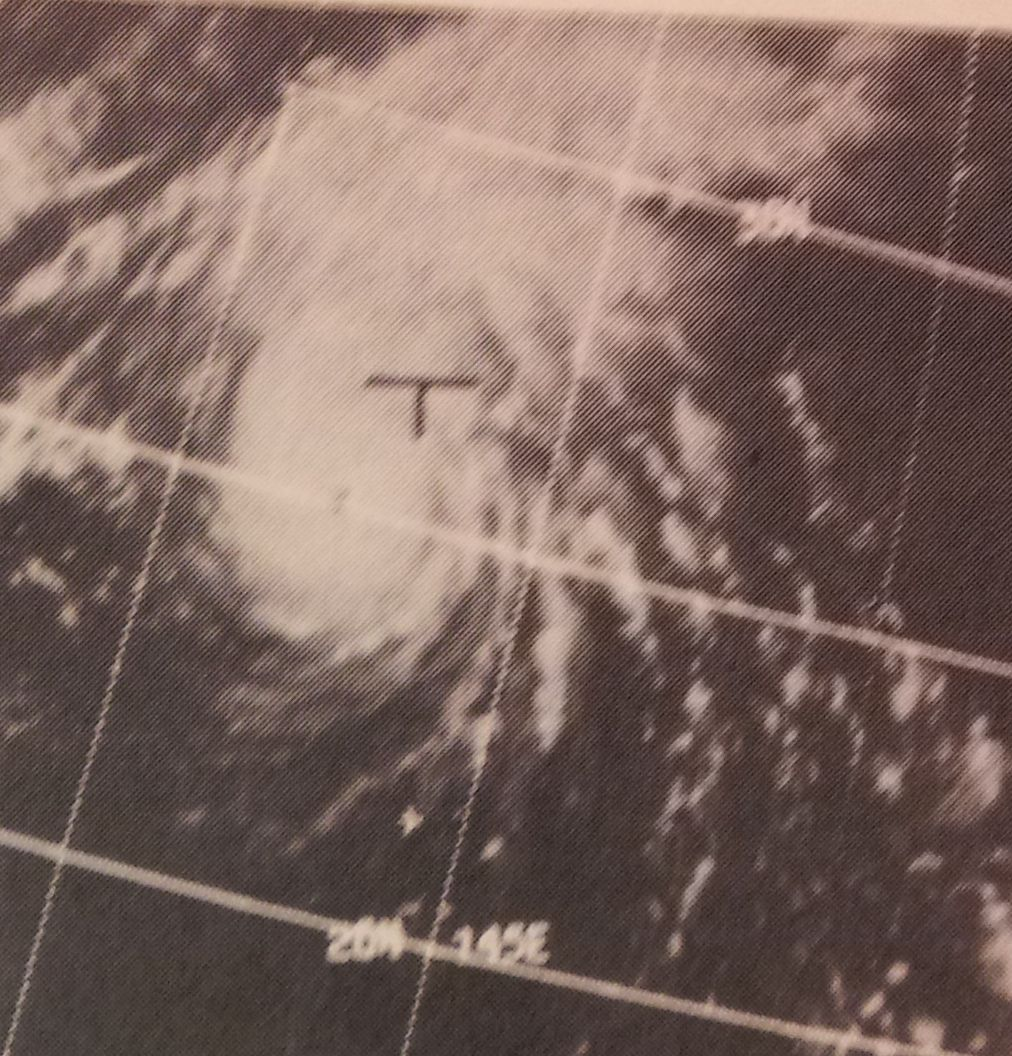
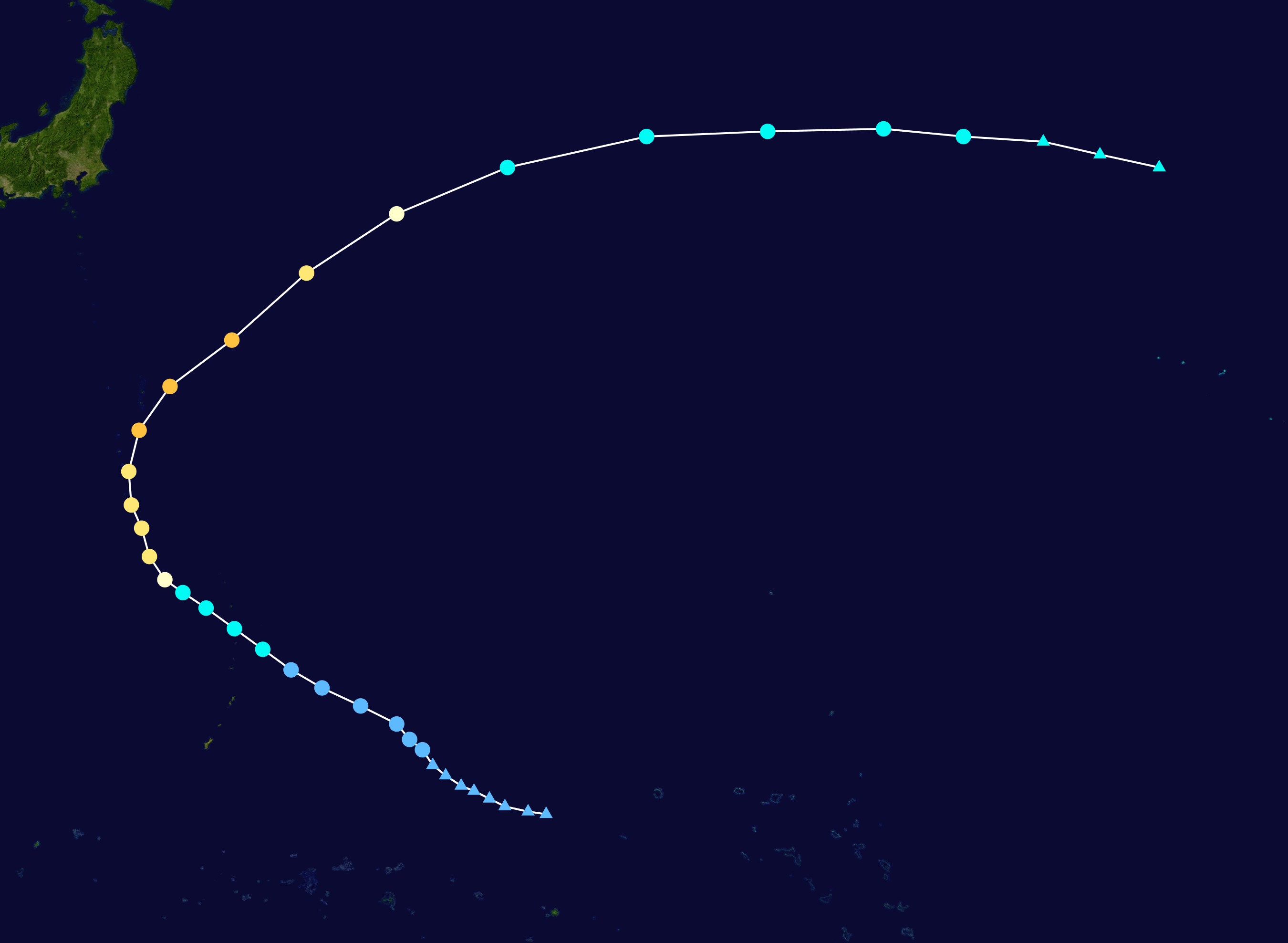
- Duration: October 5 – October 13
- Peak intensity: 195 km/h (120 mph) (1-min); 930 hPa (mbar)

=== Typhoon Ida ===
- Typhoon (JMA)
- Category 4-equivalent typhoon (SSHWS)
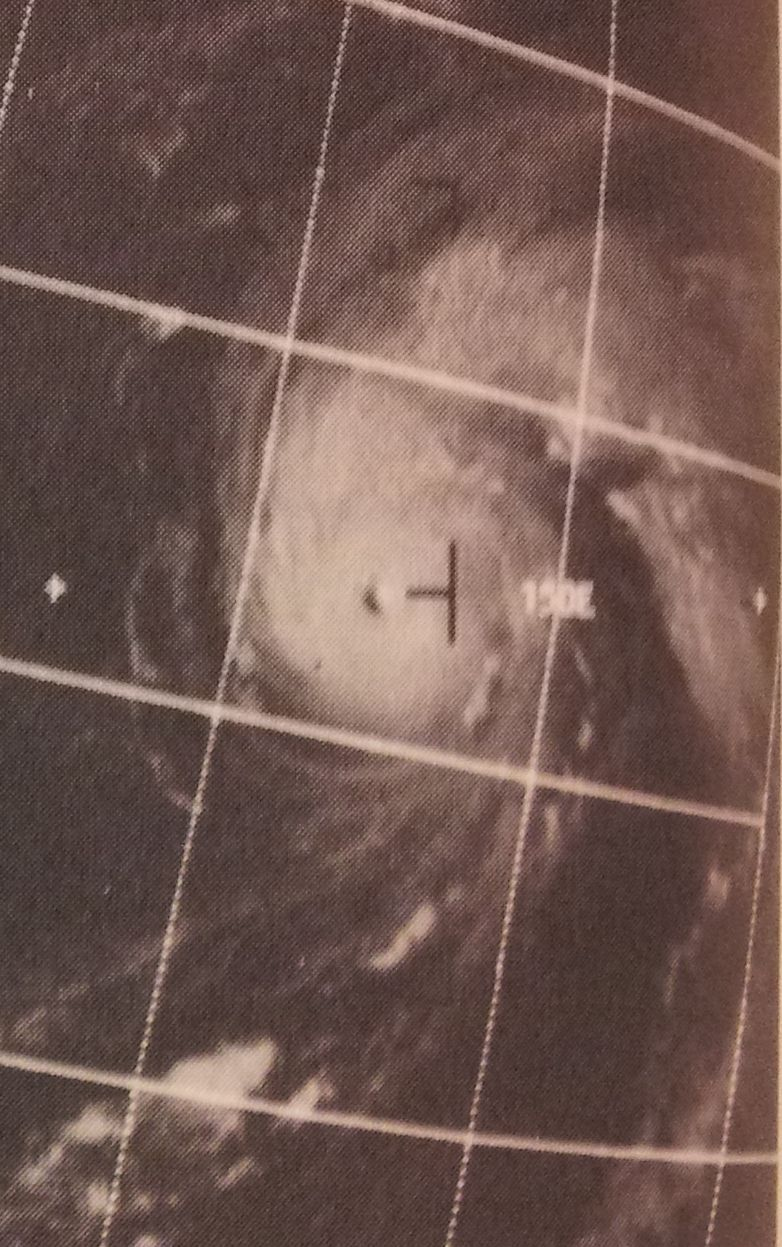
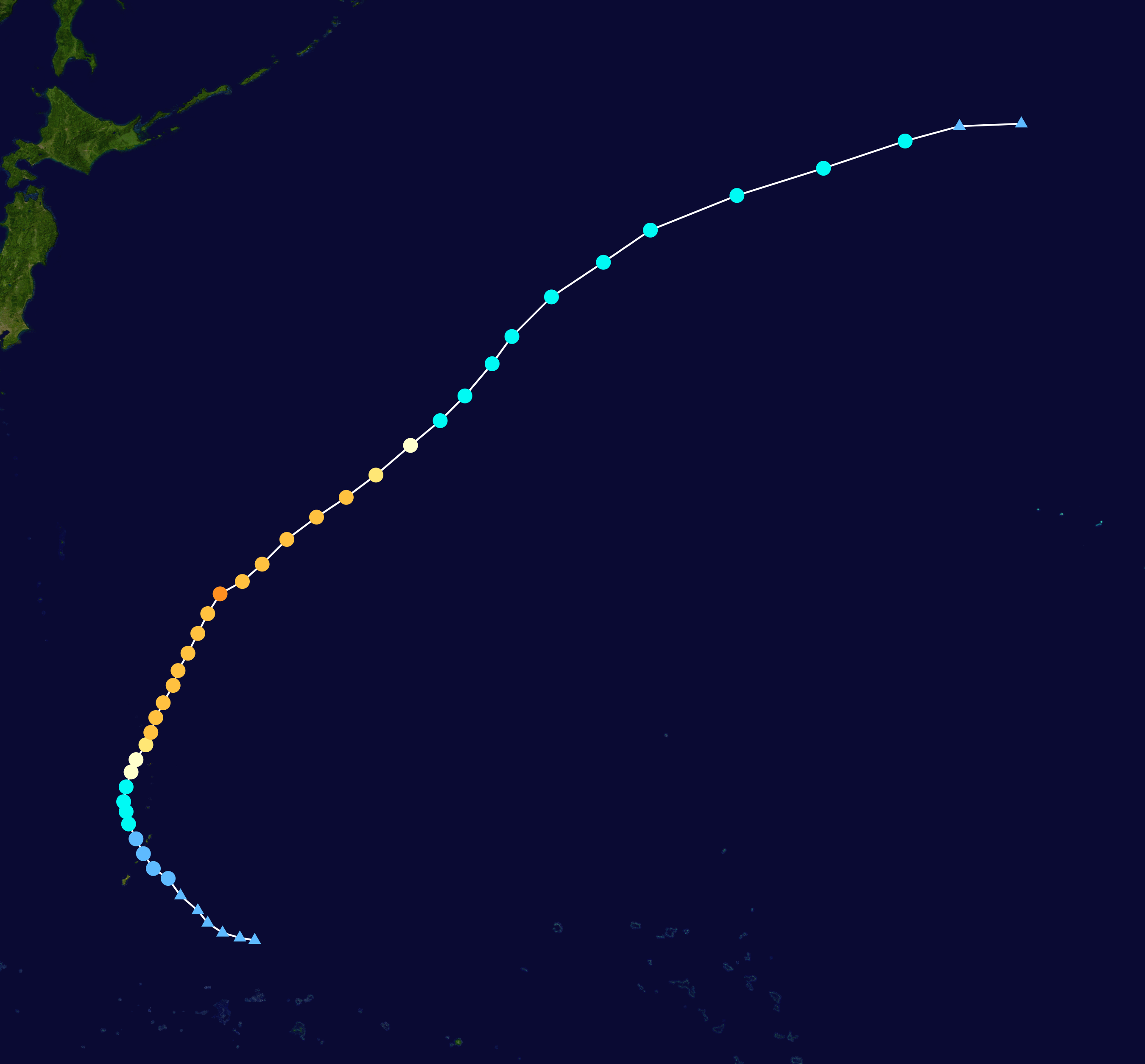
- Duration: October 14 – October 24
- Peak intensity: 215 km/h (130 mph) (1-min); 915 hPa (mbar)

=== Typhoon June (Pining) ===
- Typhoon (JMA)
- Category 3-equivalent typhoon (SSHWS)
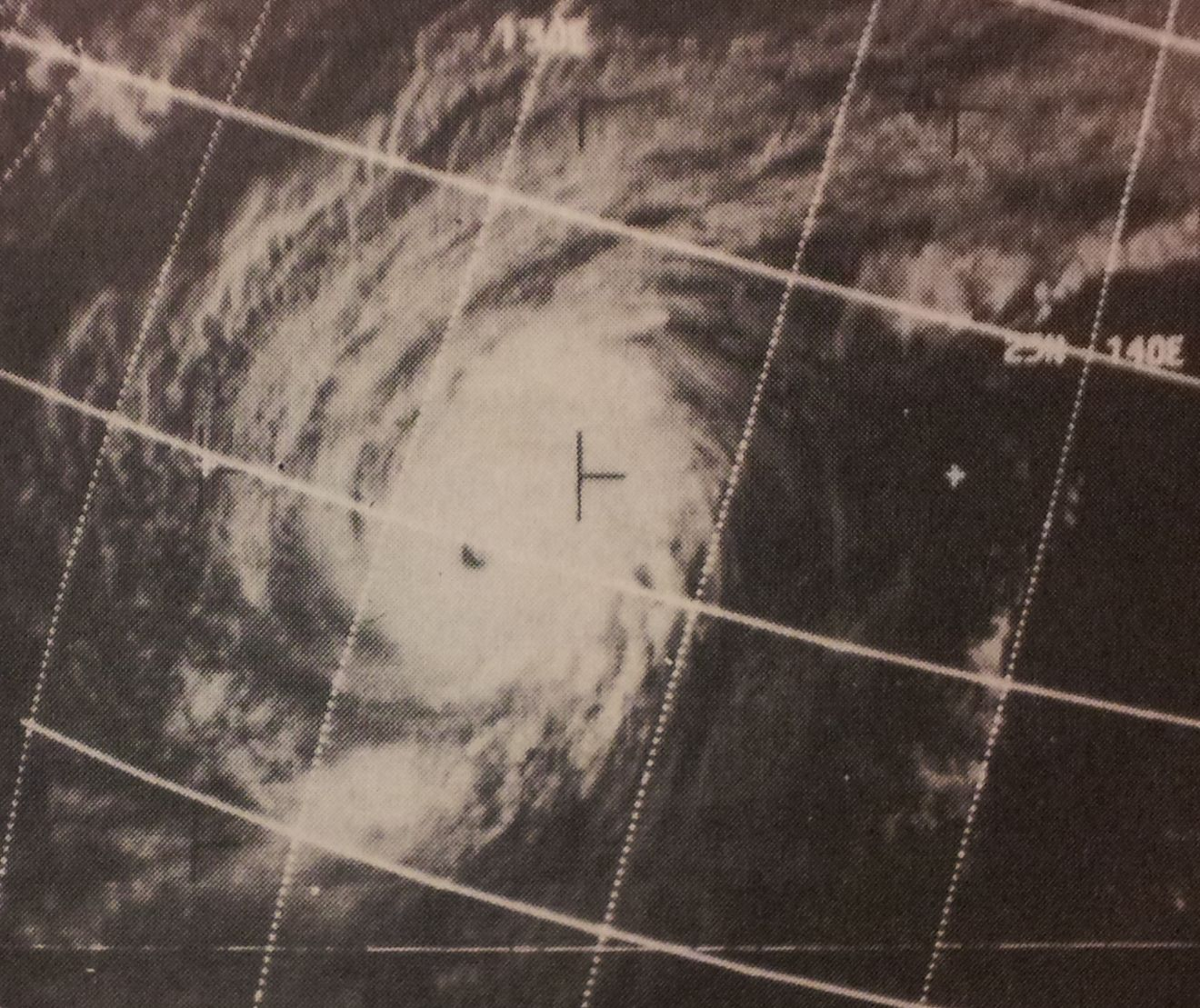
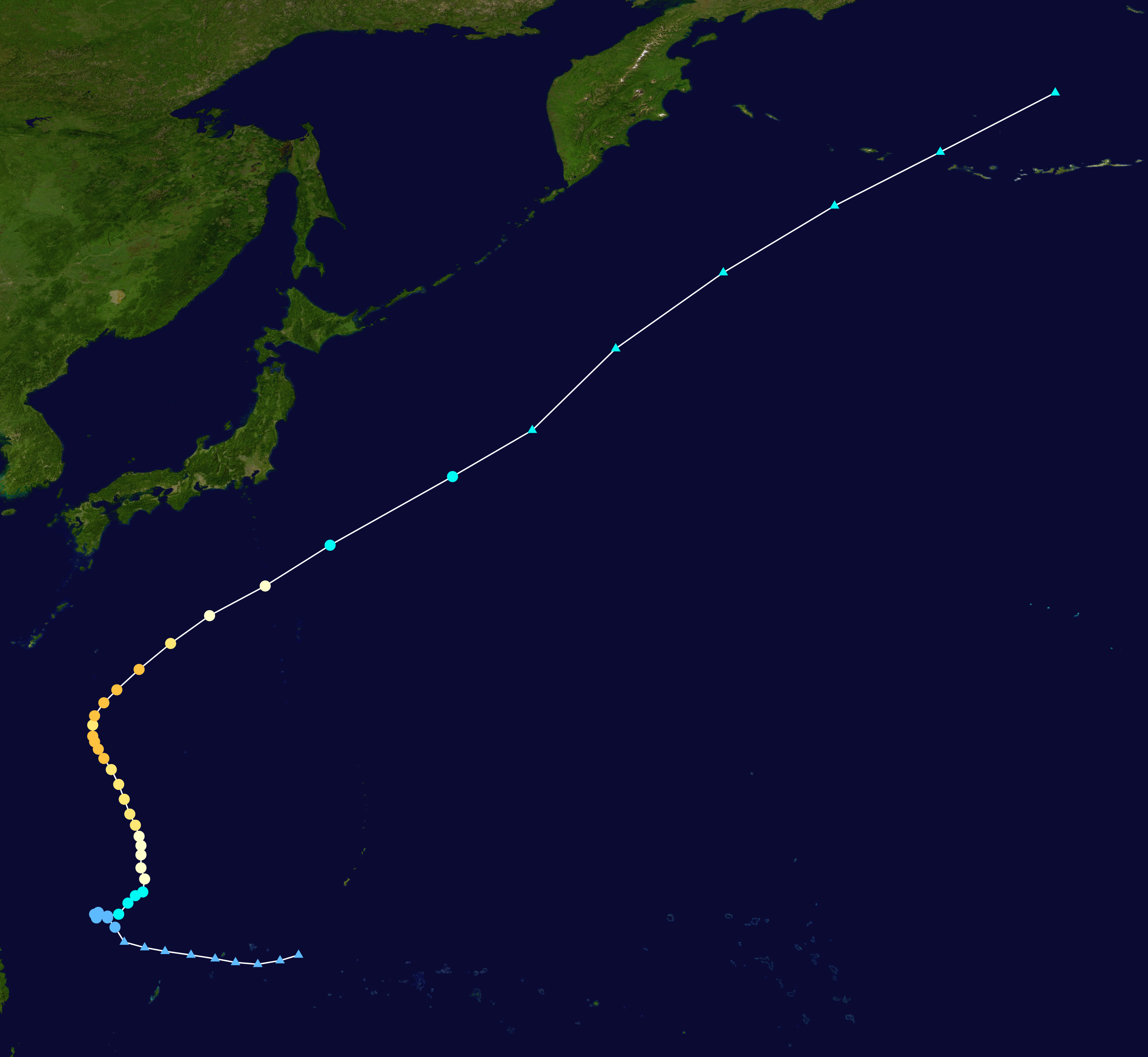
- Duration: October 26 – November 5
- Peak intensity: 195 km/h (120 mph) (1-min); 940 hPa (mbar)

=== Typhoon Kathy (Rubing) ===
- Typhoon (JMA)
- Category 3-equivalent typhoon (SSHWS)
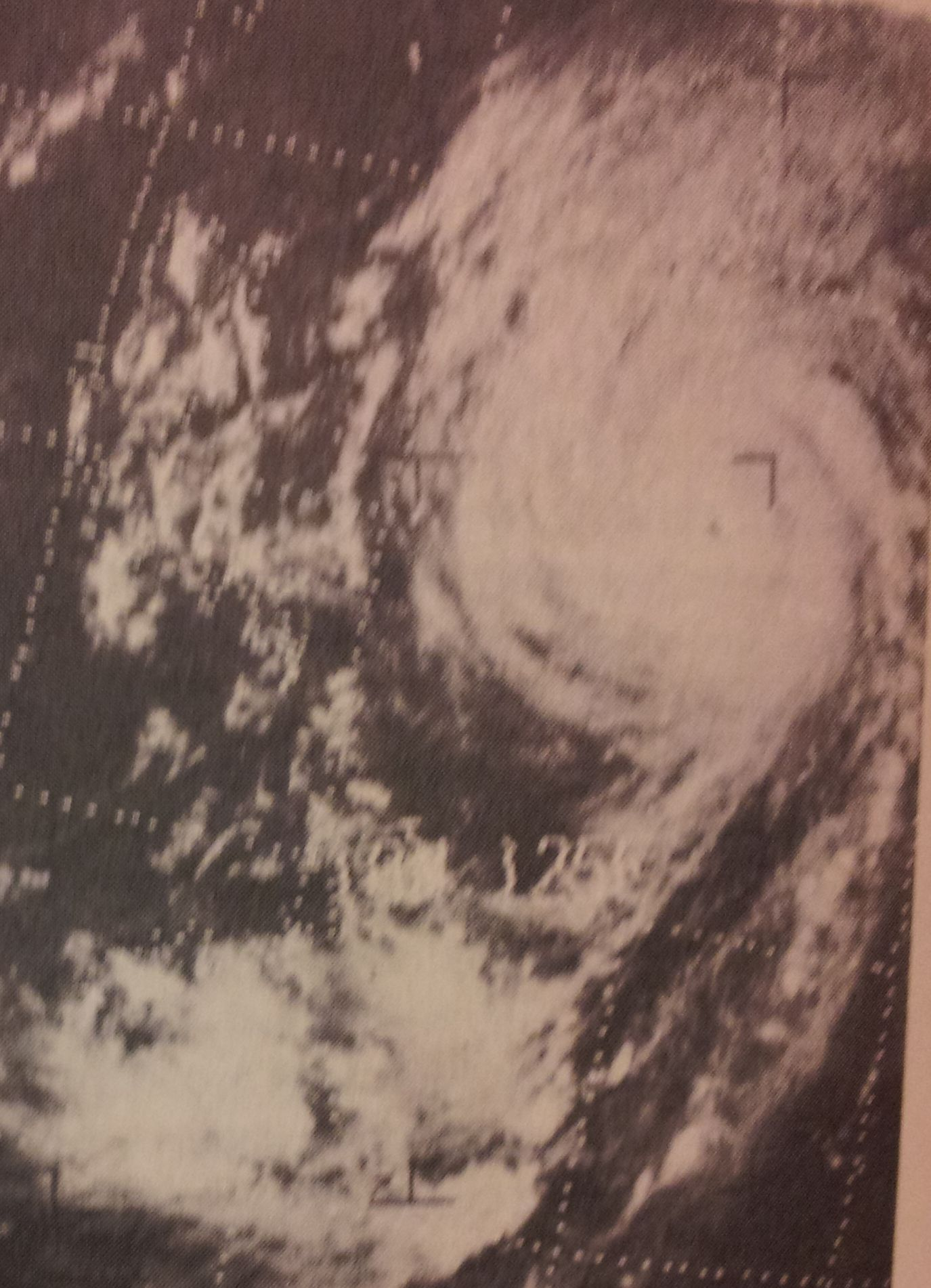
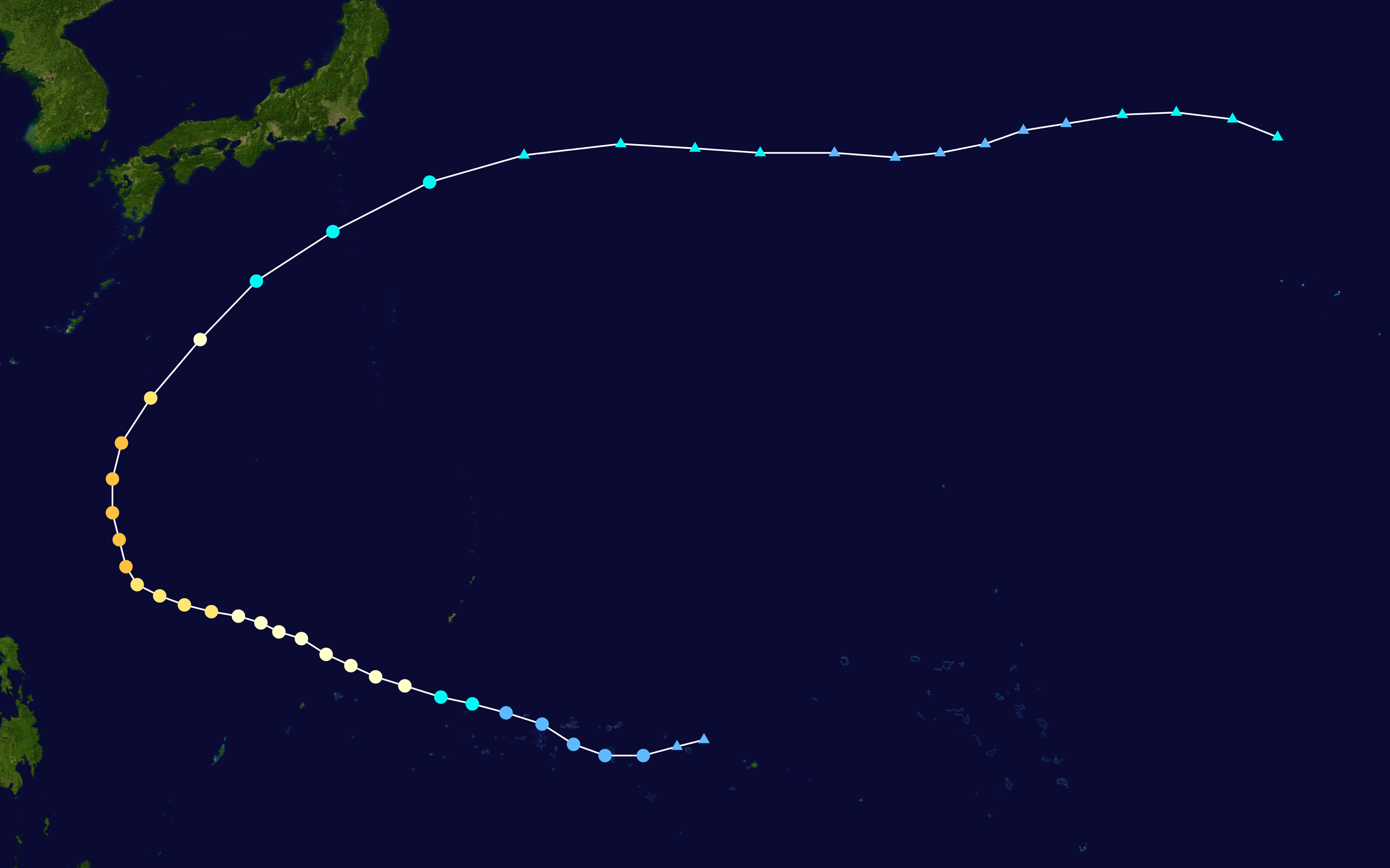
- Duration: November 2 – November 9
- Peak intensity: 205 km/h (125 mph) (1-min); 925 hPa (mbar)

=== Severe Tropical Storm Lorna (Saling) ===
- Severe tropical storm (JMA)
- Tropical storm (SSHWS)
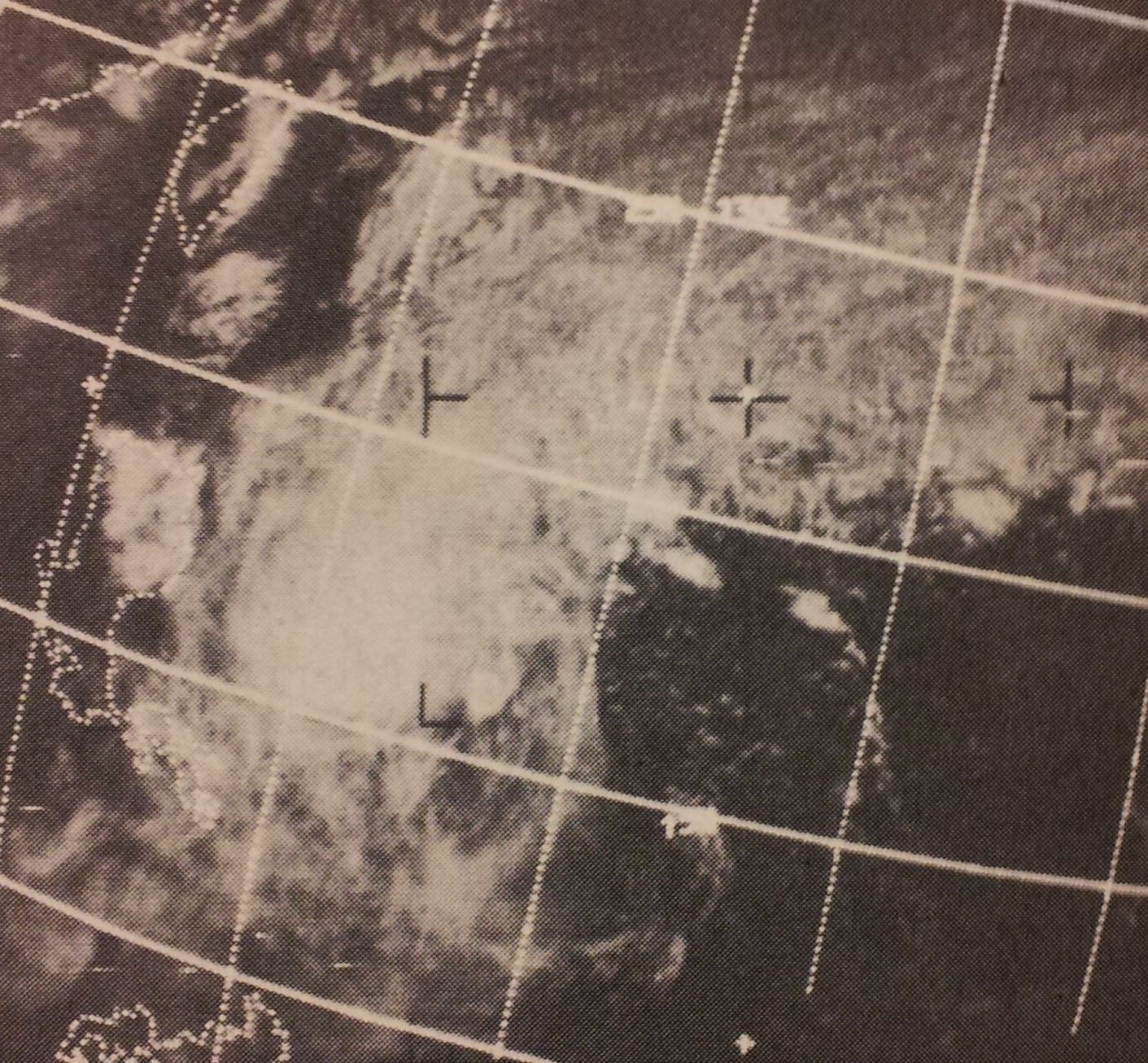
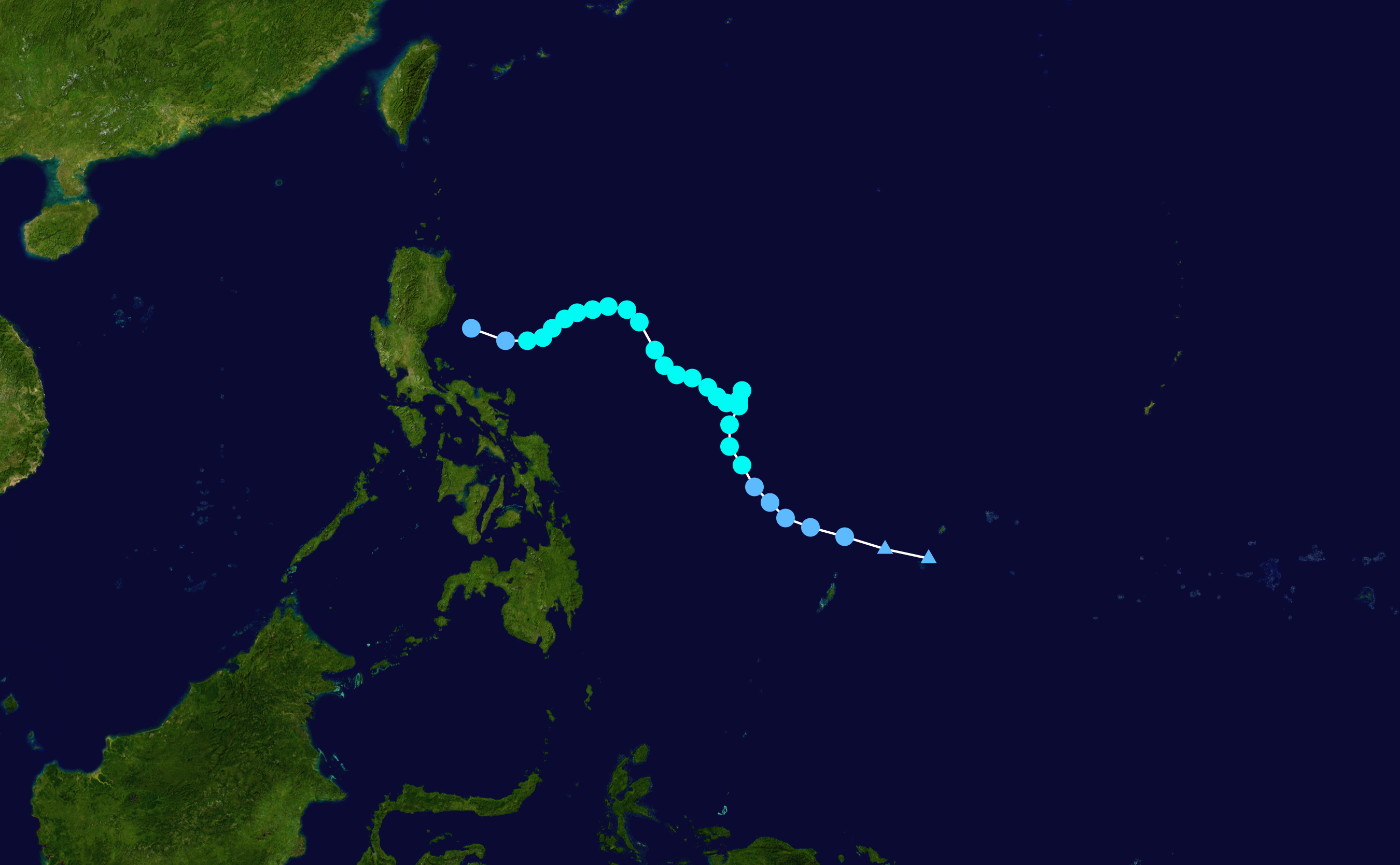
- Duration: November 23 – November 30
- Peak intensity: 95 km/h (60 mph) (1-min); 985 hPa (mbar)

=== Tropical Storm Marie ===
- Tropical storm (JMA)
- Tropical storm (SSHWS)
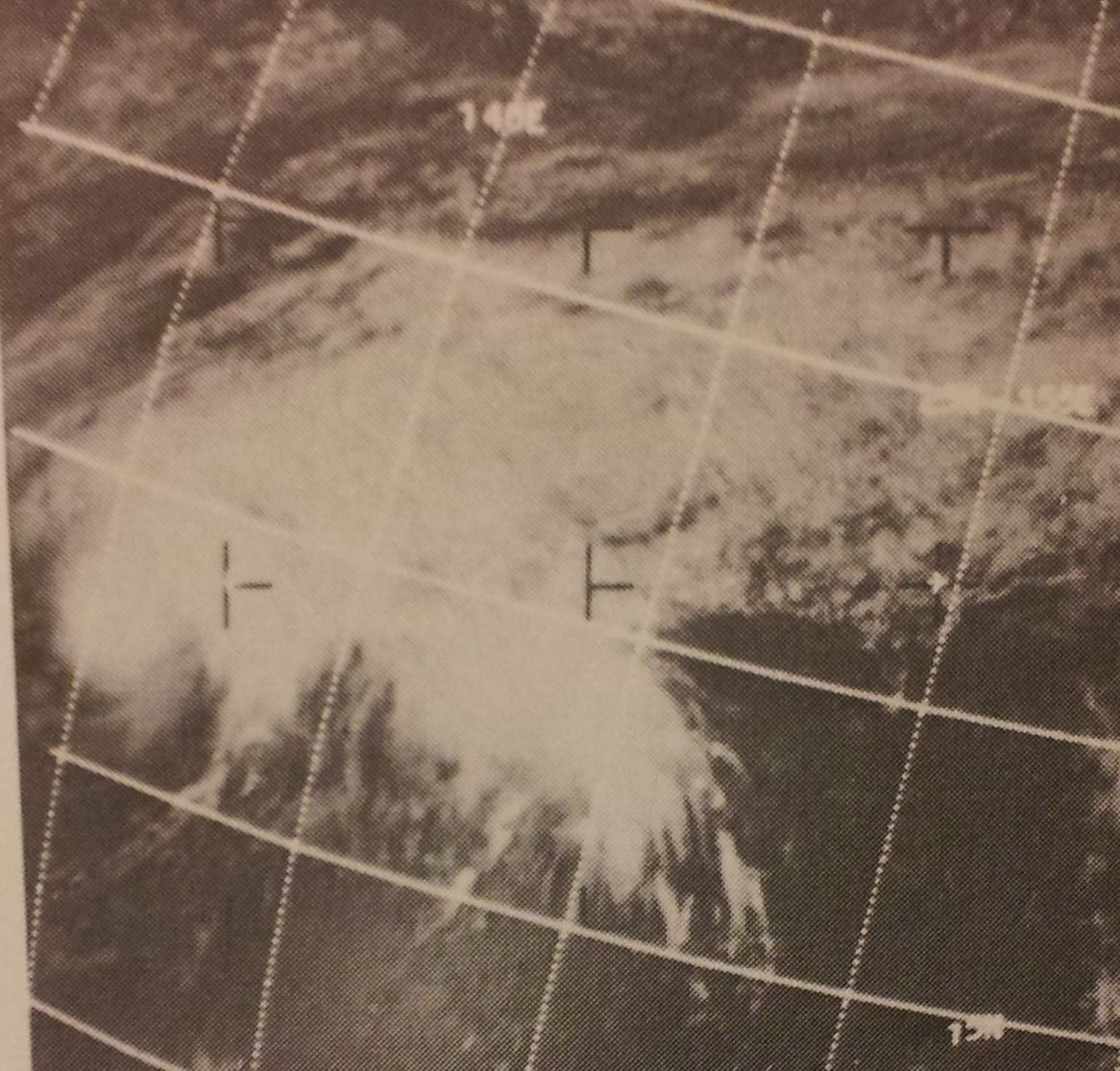
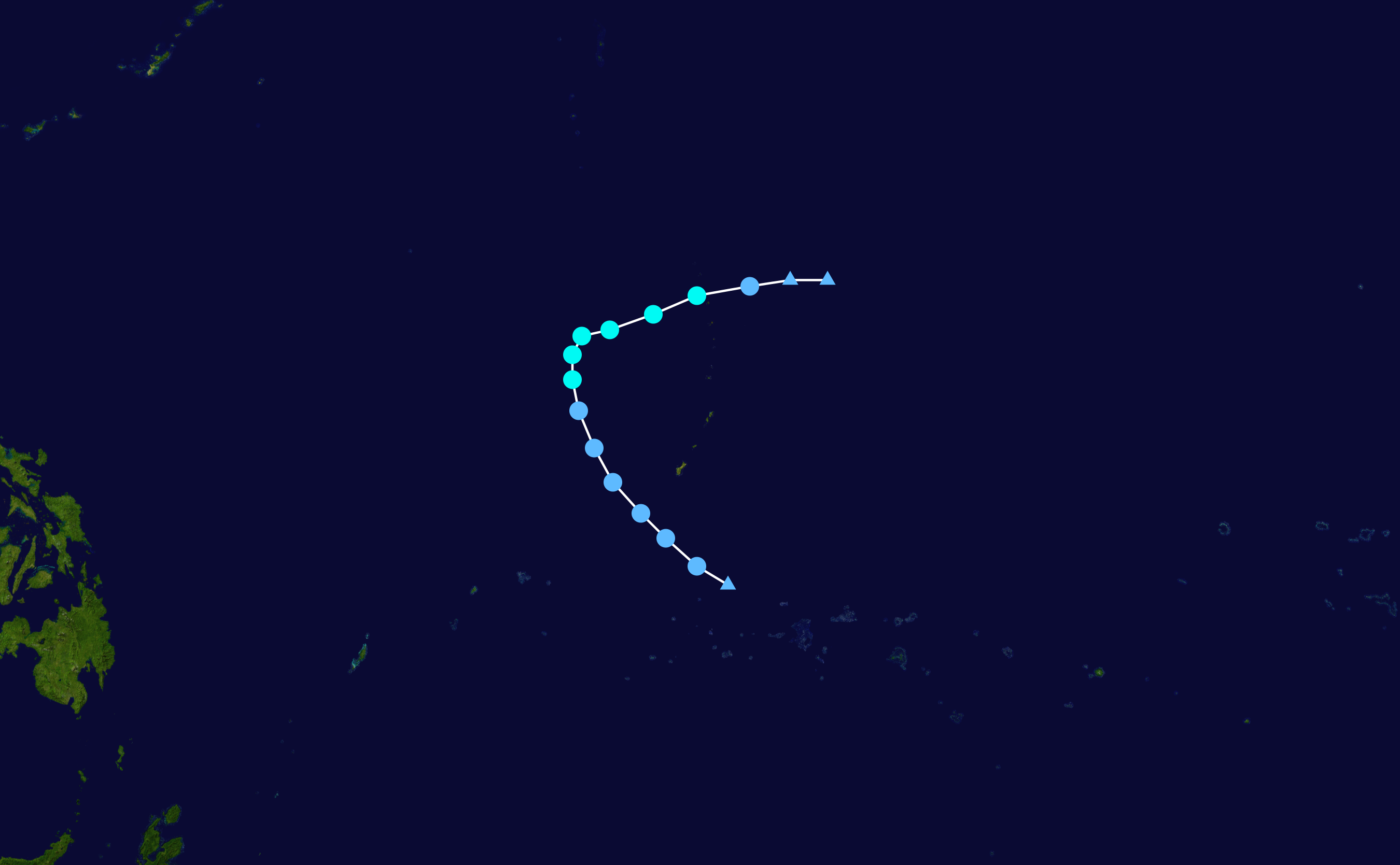
- Duration: December 18 – December 21
- Peak intensity: 95 km/h (60 mph) (1-min); 995 hPa (mbar)

== Storm names ==
=== International ===
Western North Pacific tropical cyclones were named by the Joint Typhoon Warning Center. The first storm of 1969 was named Phyllis and the final one was named Marie.

- Agnes
- Bonnie
- Carmen
- Della
- Elaine
- Faye
- Gloria
- Hester
- Irma
- Judy
- Kit
- Lola
- Mamie
- Nina
- Ora
- Phyllis 1W
- Rita 2W
- Susan 3W
- Tess 4W
- Viola 5W
- Winnie 6W
- Alice 7W
- Betty 8W
- Cora 9W
- Doris 10W
- Elsie 14W
- Flossie 15W
- Grace 16W
- Helen 18W
- Ida 19W
- June 20W
- Kathy 21W
- Lorna 22W
- Marie 23W
- Nancy
- Olga
- Pamela
- Ruby
- Sally
- Therese
- Violet
- Wilda
- Anita
- Billie
- Clara
- Dot
- Ellen
- Fran
- Georgia
- Hope
- Iris
- Joan
- Kate
- Louise
- Marge
- Nora
- Opal
- Patsy
- Ruth
- Sarah
- Thelma
- Vera
- Wanda
- Amy
- Babe
- Carla
- Dinah
- Emma
- Freda
- Gilda
- Harriet
- Ivy
- Jean
- Kim
- Lucy
- Mary
- Nadine
- Olive
- Polly
- Rose
- Shirley
- Trix
- Virginia
- Wendy

=== Philippines ===
Atring	Bining	Kuring	Daling	Elang
Goring	Huling	Ibiang	Luming	Miling
Narsing	Openg	Pining	Rubing	Saling
Tasing (unused)	Unding (unused)	Walding (unused)	Yeyeng (unused)	
Auxiliary list
				Anding (unused)
Binang (unused)	Kadiang (unused)	Dinang (unused)	Epang (unused)	Gundang (unused)

The Philippine Weather Bureau uses its own naming scheme for tropical cyclones in their area of responsibility. PWB assigns names to tropical depressions that form within their area of responsibility and any tropical cyclone that might move into their area of responsibility. Should the list of names for a given year prove to be insufficient, names are taken from an auxiliary list, the first 6 of which are published each year before the season starts. Names not retired from this list will be used again in the 1973 season. This is the same list used for the 1965 season. PWB uses its own naming scheme that starts in the Filipino alphabet, with names of Filipino female names ending with "ng" (A, B, K, D, etc.). Names that were not assigned/going to use are marked in gray.

== Season effects ==
This table will list all the storms that developed in the northwestern Pacific Ocean west of the International Date Line and north of the equator during 1969. It will include their intensity, duration, name, areas affected, deaths, missing persons (in parentheses), and damage totals. Classification and intensity values will be based on estimations conducted by the JMA, however due to lack of information around this time sustained winds were recorded by the JTWC. All damage figures will be in 1969 USD. Damages and deaths from a storm will include when the storm was a precursor wave or an extratropical low.

Name	Dates	Peak intensity			Areas affected	Damage (USD)	Deaths	Ref(s).
Name	Dates	Category	Wind speed	Pressure	Areas affected	Damage (USD)	Deaths	Ref(s).
Phyllis	January 16–24	Typhoon	155 km/h (95 mph)	965 hPa (28.50 inHg)	Micronesia	None	None	
TD	February 22–23	Tropical depression	Not specified	1,002 hPa (29.59 inHg)	Caroline Islands	None	None	
Rita	March 6–9	Tropical storm	75 km/h (45 mph)	995 hPa (29.38 inHg)	Micronesia	None	None	
Susan (Atring)	April 15–26	Typhoon	195 km/h (120 mph)	940 hPa (27.76 inHg)	Caroline Islands, Philippines	Unknown	Unknown	
Bining	May 3–5	Tropical depression	45 km/h (30 mph)	Not specified	Philippines	None	None	
TD	May 9–10	Tropical depression	Not specified	1,010 hPa (29.83 inHg)	None	None	None	
Tess (Kuring)	July 6–12	Typhoon	130 km/h (80 mph)	970 hPa (28.64 inHg)	Philippines, Vietnam	Unknown	Unknown	
TD	July 10–17	Tropical depression	Not specified	1,004 hPa (29.65 inHg)	Caroline Islands, Philippines	None	None	
TD	July 11–12	Tropical depression	Not specified	1,008 hPa (29.77 inHg)	None	None	None	
TD	July 13–15	Tropical depression	Not specified	1,008 hPa (29.77 inHg)	None	None	None	
TD	July 14–18	Tropical depression	Not specified	1,004 hPa (29.65 inHg)	Philippines, Vietnam	None	None	
TD	July 15	Tropical depression	Not specified	1,008 hPa (29.77 inHg)	Vietnam	None	None	
TD	July 16	Tropical depression	Not specified	1,009 hPa (29.80 inHg)	None	None	None	
Viola (Elang)	July 20–30	Typhoon	240 km/h (150 mph)	900 hPa (26.58 inHg)	Philippines, Taiwan, China	Unknown	>1,000	
Daling	July 21–25	Tropical depression	55 km/h (35 mph)	1,000 hPa (29.53 inHg)	South China	None	None	
Winnie (Goring)	July 26 – August 2	Severe tropical storm	95 km/h (60 mph)	985 hPa (29.09 inHg)	None	None	None	
TD	July 26–29	Tropical depression	Not specified	1,008 hPa (29.77 inHg)	Caroline Islands	None	None	
TD	July 28–30	Tropical depression	Not specified	1,008 hPa (29.77 inHg)	None	None	None	
Alice	August 1–5	Severe tropical storm	85 km/h (55 mph)	985 hPa (29.09 inHg)	Japan	None	None	
TD	August 1	Tropical depression	Not specified	1,000 hPa (29.53 inHg)	None	None	None	
Betty (Huling)	August 4–10	Typhoon	140 km/h (85 mph)	960 hPa (28.35 inHg)	Taiwan, Ryukyu Islands, East China	Unknown	Unknown	
TD	August 4–5	Tropical depression	Not specified	1,000 hPa (29.53 inHg)	Taiwan	None	None	
Cora (Ibiang)	August 12–23	Typhoon	155 km/h (95 mph)	935 hPa (27.61 inHg)	Caroline Islands, Ryukyu Islands, Japan	Unknown	Unknown	
Doris	August 29 – September 3	Typhoon	120 km/h (75 mph)	975 hPa (28.79 inHg)	Vietnam, Laos	Unknown	Unknown	
TD	August 29	Tropical depression	Not specified	1,008 hPa (29.77 inHg)	Caroline Islands	None	None	
TD	September 2–3	Tropical depression	Not specified	1,008 hPa (29.77 inHg)	None	None	None	
TD	September 3–6	Tropical depression	Not specified	1,004 hPa (29.65 inHg)	Palau	None	None	
Luming	September 3–8	Tropical depression	55 km/h (35 mph)	1,004 hPa (29.65 inHg)	Philippines	None	None	
12W	September 4–10	Tropical depression	55 km/h (35 mph)	998 hPa (29.47 inHg)	Philippines	None	None	
TD	September 7–11	Tropical depression	Not specified	998 hPa (29.47 inHg)	Ryukyu Islands	None	None	
11W	September 8–15	Tropical depression	55 km/h (35 mph)	992 hPa (29.29 inHg)	Philippines, Taiwan	None	None	
13W (Miling)	September 9–14	Tropical depression	55 km/h (35 mph)	996 hPa (29.41 inHg)	Philippines, Taiwan	None	None	
TD	September 13–18	Tropical depression	Not specified	1,004 hPa (29.65 inHg)	None	None	None	
Elsie (Narsing)	September 16–28	Typhoon	280 km/h (175 mph)	895 hPa (26.43 inHg)	Mariana Islands, Taiwan, Ryukyu Islands, China	Unknown	102	
TD	September 16–20	Tropical depression	Not specified	1,004 hPa (29.65 inHg)	Vietnam	None	None	
TD	September 18–20	Tropical depression	Not specified	1,000 hPa (29.53 inHg)	None	None	None	
TD	September 20–23	Tropical depression	Not specified	1,008 hPa (29.77 inHg)	None	None	None	
TD	September 23–26	Tropical depression	Not specified	1,006 hPa (29.71 inHg)	None	None	None	
Flossie (Openg)	September 27 – October 9	Typhoon	110 km/h (70 mph)	960 hPa (28.35 inHg)	Taiwan, Ryukyu Islands	Unknown	75	
Grace	September 28 – October 8	Typhoon	175 km/h (110 mph)	940 hPa (27.76 inHg)	None	None	None	
17W	September 30 – October 1	Tropical depression	55 km/h (35 mph)	1,002 hPa (29.59 inHg)	Philippines	None	None	
TD	October 3–10	Tropical depression	Not specified	1,006 hPa (29.71 inHg)	None	None	None	
TD	October 3–5	Tropical depression	Not specified	1,006 hPa (29.71 inHg)	None	None	None	
TD	October 4–5	Tropical depression	Not specified	1,008 hPa (29.77 inHg)	Mariana Islands	None	None	
Helen	October 5–13	Typhoon	195 km/h (120 mph)	930 hPa (27.46 inHg)	Mariana Islands	None	None	
TD	October 7–11	Tropical depression	Not specified	1,008 hPa (29.77 inHg)	None	None	None	
Ida	October 14–24	Typhoon	215 km/h (135 mph)	915 hPa (27.02 inHg)	Mariana Islands	None	None	
TD	October 16–17	Tropical depression	Not specified	1,008 hPa (29.77 inHg)	None	None	None	
TD	October 25–28	Tropical depression	Not specified	1,006 hPa (29.71 inHg)	Caroline Islands	None	None	
June (Pining)	October 26 – November 5	Typhoon	195 km/h (120 mph)	940 hPa (27.76 inHg)	None	None	None	
TD	October 31 – November 1	Tropical depression	Not specified	1,004 hPa (29.65 inHg)	Philippines	None	None	
Kathy (Rubing)	November 2–5	Typhoon	205 km/h (125 mph)	925 hPa (27.32 inHg)	Caroline Islands	None	None	
TD	November 13–14	Tropical depression	Not specified	1,006 hPa (29.71 inHg)	Caroline Islands	None	None	
TD	November 19–21	Tropical depression	Not specified	1,006 hPa (29.71 inHg)	Philippines	None	None	
TD	November 21–27	Tropical depression	Not specified	1,002 hPa (29.59 inHg)	None	None	None	
Lorna (Saling)	November 23–30	Severe tropical storm	95 km/h (60 mph)	985 hPa (29.09 inHg)	Philippines	None	None	
TD	December 1–5	Tropical depression	Not specified	1,010 hPa (29.83 inHg)	None	None	None	
TD	December 11	Tropical depression	Not specified	1,006 hPa (29.71 inHg)	None	None	None	
Marie	December 18–21	Tropical storm	75 km/h (45 mph)	996 hPa (29.41 inHg)	Mariana Islands	None	None	
TD	December 23–24	Tropical depression	Not specified	1,010 hPa (29.83 inHg)	None	None	None	
TD	December 27–30	Tropical depression	Not specified	1,008 hPa (29.77 inHg)	Palau	None	None	
Season aggregates
61 systems	January 16 – December 30, 1969		280 km/h (175 mph)	895 hPa (26.43 inHg)		>$216 million	>1,077	

== See also ==
- List of Pacific typhoon seasons
- 1969 Pacific hurricane season
- 1969 Atlantic hurricane season
- 1969 North Indian Ocean cyclone season
- Australian cyclone seasons: 1968–69, 1969–70
- South Pacific cyclone seasons: 1968–69, 1969–70
- South-West Indian Ocean cyclone seasons: 1968–69, 1969–70
