= 1969 hurricane season =

1969 hurricane season may refer to:

- The 1969 Atlantic hurricane season
- The 1969 Pacific hurricane season
