= List of cyclonic storms =

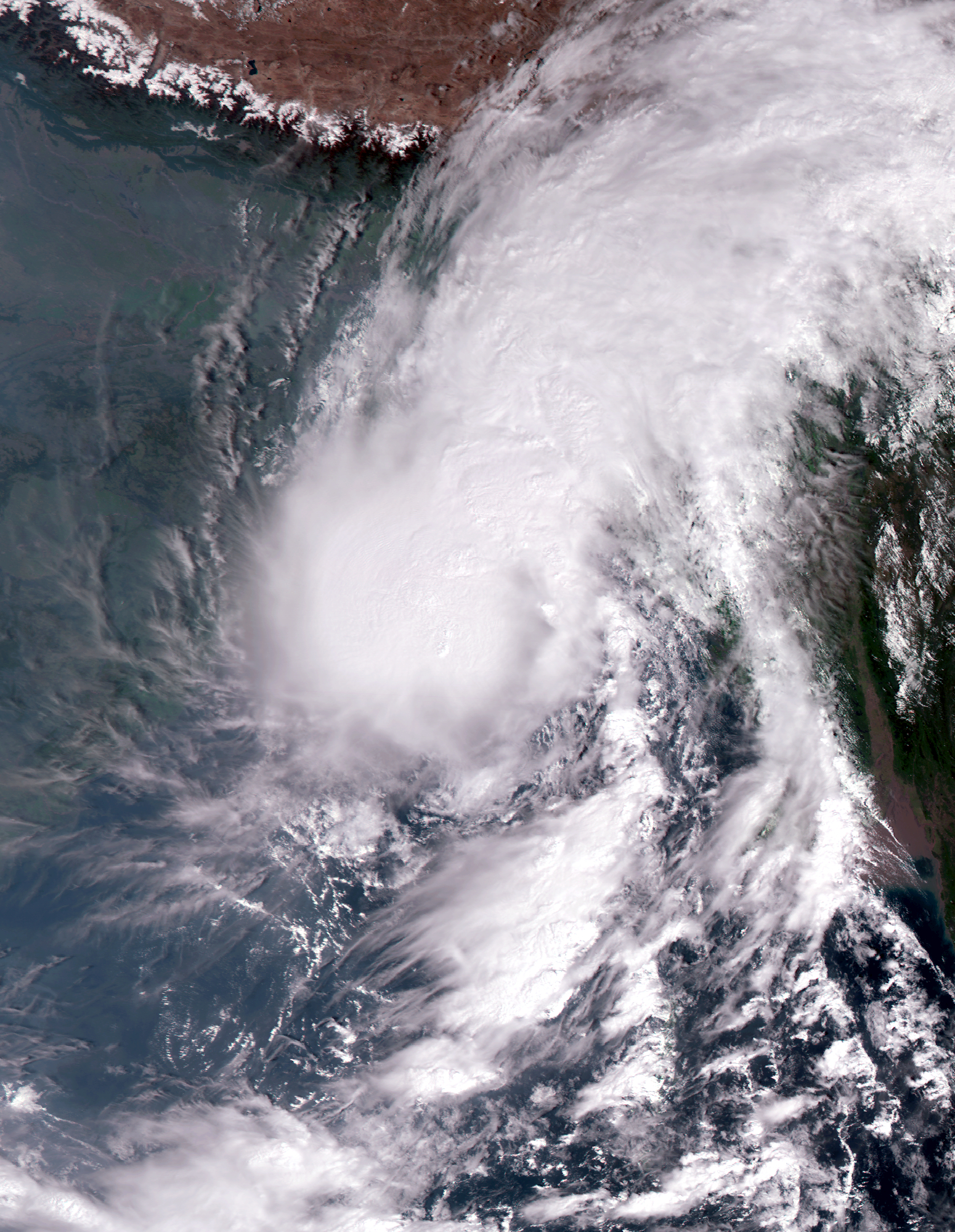
Cyclone Sitrang, near peak intensity on October 24, 2022

A Cyclonic Storm is a category used by the India Meteorological Department (IMD) to classify tropical cyclones, within the North Indian Ocean tropical cyclone basin between the Malay Peninsula and the Arabian Peninsula. Within the basin, a cyclonic storm is defined as a tropical cyclone that has 3-minute mean maximum sustained wind speeds of between 35–48 knots (65–89 km/h; 40–55 mph).

== Background ==
The North Indian Ocean tropical cyclone basin is located to the north of the Equator, and encompasses the Bay of Bengal and the Arabian Sea, between the Malay Peninsula and the Arabian Peninsula. The basin is officially monitored by the India Meteorological Department's Regional Specialized Meteorological Centre in New Delhi, however, other national meteorological services such as the Bangladesh and Pakistan Meteorological Department's also monitor the basin. The Cyclonic Storm category has historically been used to classify all tropical cyclones with winds between 35–48 knots (65–89 km/h; 40–55 mph).

== Systems ==
Name	System dates	Duration	Sustained wind speeds	Pressure	Land areas affected	Deaths	Damage (USD)	Refs
Unnamed	January 1 – 10, 1967	Not Specified	Not Specified	996 hPa (29.41 inHg)				
Unnamed	October 20 – 21, 1967	Not Specified	Not Specified	998 hPa (29.47 inHg)				
Unnamed	September 10 – 14, 1968	Not Specified	Not Specified	Not Specified				
Unnamed	May 16 – 18, 1969	2 days	50 mph (85 km/h)	989 hPa (29.21 inHg)	Andrah Pradesh	600		
Unnamed	August 13 – 14, 1969	12 hours	Not Specified	990 hPa (29.23 inHg)				
Unnamed	October 9 – 11, 1969	2 days	Not Specified	1000 hPa (29.53 inHg)				
Unnamed	October 21 – 23, 1969	2 days	50 mph (85 km/h)	995 hPa (29.38 inHg)				
Unnamed	December 21 – 26, 1969	2 days	Not Specified	995 hPa (29.38 inHg)	Andrah Pradesh	200		
Unnamed	June 7 – 8, 1970	Not Specified	40 mph (65 km/h)	982 hPa (29.00 inHg)	West Bengal, Orissa, Madhya Pradesh			
Unnamed	September 2 – 13, 1970	Not Specified	Not Specified	Not Specified	West Bengal, Orissa, Coastal Arabia			
Unnamed	November 22 – 29, 1970	Not Specified	45 mph (75 km/h)	Not Specified	Somalia			
Unnamed	May 5 – 8, 1971	3 days	Not Specified	993 hPa (29.32 inHg)	Bangladesh			
Unnamed	July 14 – 15, 1972	1 day	40 mph (65 km/h)	984 hPa (29.06 inHg)				
Unnamed	June 10 – 12, 1973	2 days	40 mph (65 km/h)	992 hPa (29.29 inHg)				
Contai	July 19 – 22, 1973	3 days	Not Specified	Not Specified				
Chandbali	October 9 – 12, 1973	3 days	50 mph (85 km/h)	994 hPa (29.35 inHg)				
Unnamed	April 13 – 16, 1974	3 days	50 mph (85 km/h)	996 hPa (29.41 inHg)				
Unnamed	May 18 – 22, 1974	4 days	45 mph (75 km/h)	996 hPa (29.41 inHg)				
Unnamed	June 6 – 7, 1975	1 day	50 mph (85 km/h)	986 hPa (29.12 inHg)	Bangladesh			
Unnamed	November 2 – 3, 1975	1 day	45 mph (75 km/h)	1000 hPa (29.53 inHg)				
Unnamed	November 8 – 9, 1975	1 day	45 mph (75 km/h)	998 hPa (29.47 inHg)				
Unnamed	August 27 – September 8, 1976	1 day	45 mph (75 km/h)	990 hPa (29.23 inHg)				
Unnamed	October 15 – 21, 1976	1 day	50 mph (85 km/h)	994 hPa (29.35 inHg)				
Unnamed	November 22 – 29, 1976	1 day	45 mph (75 km/h)	1000 hPa (29.53 inHg)				
Unnamed	August 27, 1978	1 day	50 mph (85 km/h)	986 hPa (29.12 inHg)				
Unnamed	October 25 – 28, 1978	3 days	50 mph (85 km/h)	996 hPa (29.41 inHg)				
Unnamed	November 24 – 25, 1979	1 day	50 mph (85 km/h)	996 hPa (29.41 inHg)	Tamil Nadu, Andrah Pradesh			
Unnamed	October 17 – 18, 1980	1 day	45 mph (75 km/h)	996 hPa (29.41 inHg)	Andrah Pradesh	None	None	
Unnamed	December 4 – 5, 1980	1 day	45 mph (75 km/h)	998 hPa (29.47 inHg)	Andaman and Nicobar Islands, Tamil Nadu; Andrah Pradesh, West Bengal	None	None	
Unnamed	December 16 – 17, 1980	1 day	45 mph (75 km/h)	998 hPa (29.47 inHg)	Sri Lanka	None	None	
Unnamed	August 7 – 9, 1981	2 day	50 mph (85 km/h)	984 hPa (29.06 inHg)				
Unnamed	November 9 – 10, 1981	1 day	50 mph (85 km/h)	996 hPa (29.41 inHg)				
ARB 02	May 30 – 31, 1985	1 day	50 mph (85 km/h)	Not Specified				
BOB 06	September 20, 1985	21 hours	50 mph (85 km/h)	Not Specified				
BOB 09	October 9 – 13, 1985	2 days 15 hours	50 mph (85 km/h)	Not Specified				
BOB 12	November 16 – 17, 1985	1 day	40 mph (65 km/h)	Not Specified				
BOB 13	December 12 – 13, 1985	2 days	40 mph (65 km/h)	Not Specified				
BOB 07	November 9, 1986	9 hours	50 mph (85 km/h)	Not Specified				
BOB 02	June 4 – 5, 1987	1 day 3 hours	50 mph (85 km/h)	980 hPa (28.94 inHg)				
BOB 06	October 15 – 16, 1987	1 day	50 mph (85 km/h)	994 hPa (29.35 inHg)				
BOB 05	July 22 – 23, 1989	15 hours	50 mph (85 km/h)	Not Specified				
BOB 02	June 1 – 2, 1991	15 hours	50 mph (85 km/h)	990 hPa (29.23 inHg)				
BOB 08	November 13 – 15, 1991	1 day 18 hours	50 mph (85 km/h)	998 hPa (29.47 inHg)				
BOB 01	May 18 – 19, 1992	1 day 6 hours	40 mph (65 km/h)	992 hPa (29.29 inHg)	Myanmar			
ARB 01	June 11 – 12, 1992	1 day	50 mph (85 km/h)	994 hPa (29.35 inHg)				
ARB 02	October 1 – 3, 1992	2 days 6 hours	50 mph (85 km/h)	996 hPa (29.41 inHg)				
BOB 05	October 21, 1992	18 hours	50 mph (85 km/h)	996 hPa (29.41 inHg)				
BOB 06	November 4 – 6, 1992	2 days 18 hours	50 mph (85 km/h)	996 hPa (29.41 inHg)				
ARB 06	October 14 – 16, 1995	2 days 9 hours	50 mph (85 km/h)	998 hPa (29.47 inHg)				
BOB 02	June 14 – 16, 1996	2 days 12 hours	50 mph (85 km/h)	992 hPa (29.29 inHg)				
Linda	November 4 – 9, 1997	5 days	40 mph (65 km/h)	1004 hPa (29.65 inHg)				
ARB 05	October 16 – 17, 1998	15 hours	40 mph (65 km/h)	996 hPa (29.41 inHg)				
BOB 01	March 29 – 30, 2000	21 hours	50 mph (85 km/h)	998 hPa (29.47 inHg)				
BOB 03	October 17 – 18, 2000	1 day 3 hours	40 mph (65 km/h)	996 hPa (29.41 inHg)				
BOB 04	October 27 – 28, 2000	9 hours	40 mph (65 km/h)	996 hPa (29.41 inHg)				
ARB 03	September 25 – 27, 2001	1 day 21 hours	40 mph (65 km/h)	1000 hPa (29.53 inHg)				
ARB 04	October 9 – 10, 2001	18 hours	40 mph (65 km/h)	1000 hPa (29.53 inHg)				
BOB 05	October 15 – 16, 2001	1 day	40 mph (65 km/h)	998 hPa (29.47 inHg)				
ARB 01	May 9 – 10, 2002	1 day 3 hours	40 mph (65 km/h)	994 hPa (29.35 inHg)				
BOB 05	November 24 – 27, 2002	3 days 3 hours	40 mph (65 km/h)	1000 hPa (29.53 inHg)				
BOB 06	December 24 – 25, 2002	1 day	40 mph (65 km/h)	1000 hPa (29.53 inHg)				
Hibaru	January 15 – 16, 2005	1 day	40 mph (65 km/h)	1000 hPa (29.53 inHg)				
Pyarr	September 18 – 19, 2005	1 day 9 hours	40 mph (65 km/h)	988 hPa (29.18 inHg)				
Baaz	November 28 – December 1, 2005	1 day 9 hours	50 mph (85 km/h)	998 hPa (29.47 inHg)				
Fanoos	December 7 – 9, 2005	2 days 21 hours	50 mph (85 km/h)	998 hPa (29.47 inHg)				
Ogni	October 29 – 30, 2006	1 day 12 hours	40 mph (65 km/h)	998 hPa (29.47 inHg)				
Akash	May 14, 2007	21 hours	50 mph (85 km/h)	988 hPa (29.18 inHg)				
Yemyin	June 25 – 26, 2007	6 hours	40 mph (65 km/h)	986 hPa (29.12 inHg)				
Rashmi	October 26 – 27, 2008	15 hours	50 mph (85 km/h)	984 hPa (29.06 inHg)				
Khai Muk	November 14 – 15, 2008	18 hours	40 mph (65 km/h)	996 hPa (29.41 inHg)				
Nisha	November 26 – 27, 2008	1 day 6 hours	50 mph (85 km/h)	996 hPa (29.41 inHg)				
Bijli	April 14 – 17, 2009		45 mph (75 km/h)	996 hPa (29.41 inHg)				
Phyan	November 9 – 12, 2009		50 mph (85 km/h)	988 hPa (29.18 inHg)				
Ward	December 10 – 16, 2009		50 mph (85 km/h)	996 hPa (29.41 inHg)				
Bandu	May 19 – 23, 2010		45 mph (75 km/h)	994 hPa (29.35 inHg)				
Keila	October 29 – November 4, 2011		40 mph (65 km/h)	996 hPa (29.41 inHg)				
Murjan	October 22 – 26, 2012		45 mph (75 km/h)	998 hPa (29.47 inHg)	Yemen, Somalia			
Nilam	October 28 – November 1, 2012		50 mph (85 km/h)	987 hPa (29.15 inHg)				
Viyaru	May 10 – 17, 2013		50 mph (85 km/h)	990 hPa (29.23 inHg)				
Nanauk	June 10 – 14, 2014		50 mph (85 km/h)	986 hPa (29.12 inHg)				
Ashobaa	June 7 – 12, 2015		50 mph (85 km/h)	990 hPa (29.23 inHg)		Minimal	None	
Komen	July 26 – August 2, 2015		45 mph (75 km/h)	986 hPa (29.12 inHg)				
Roanu	May 19 – 21, 2016	2 days 15 hours	50 mph (85 km/h)	983 hPa (29.03 inHg)	Sri Lanka, India, Bangladesh, Myanmar			
Kyant	October 25 – 28	1 day 18 hours	45 mph (75 km/h)	996 hPa (29.41 inHg)	Andaman Islands, Myanmar, South India			
Nada	November 30 – December 1, 2016	1 day 18 hours	45 mph (75 km/h)	1000 hPa (29.53 inHg)	Sri Lanka, South India			
Maarutha	April 15 – 17, 2017	1 day 3 hours	45 mph (75 km/h)	996 hPa (29.41 inHg)	Myanmar, Andaman and Nicobar Islands; Thailand, Yunnan	$23,400	4	
Sagar	May 17 – 19, 2018	2 days 15 hours	50 mph (85 km/h)	994 hPa (29.35 inHg)	Yemen, Somalia, Djibouti, Ethiopia	79		
Daye	September 20, 2018	9 hours	40 mph (65 km/h)	992 hPa (29.29 inHg)	India			
Pabuk	January 4 – 7, 2019	1 day 18 hours	50 mph (85 km/h)	998 hPa (29.47 inHg)	Thailand, Myanmar, Andaman Islands	None	None	
Pawan	December 5 – 7, 2019	2 days 3 hours	45 mph (75 km/h)	998 hPa (29.47 inHg)	Somalia	None	6	
Burevi	December 1 – 3, 2020		50 mph (85 km/h)	996 hPa (29.41 inHg)	Sri Lanka, India	Unknown	11	
Gulab	September 24 – 28, 2021		50 mph (85 km/h)	992 hPa (29.29 inHg)	India	$269 million	17	
Jawad	December 3 – 6, 2021		45 mph (75 km/h)	999 hPa (29.50 inHg)	India	Unknown	1	
Sitrang	October 22 – 25, 2022		50 mph (85 km/h)	994 hPa (29.35 inHg)	Andaman and Nicobar Islands, India, Bangladesh, Myanmar	Unknown	35	

== Climatology ==
Cyclonic storms by month
Month	Number of storms
January	2
February	0
March	1
April	3
May	11
June	10
July	4
August	4
September	5
October	22
November	17
December	9

Cyclonic storms by decade
Decade	Number of storms
1890s	0
1900–1959	0
1960s	5
1970s	19
1980s	14
1990s	11
2000s	22
2010s	16
2020s	1

== See also ==
- South-West Indian Ocean tropical cyclone
