= 1969–70 South-West Indian Ocean cyclone season =

Cyclone season in the Southwest Indian Ocean

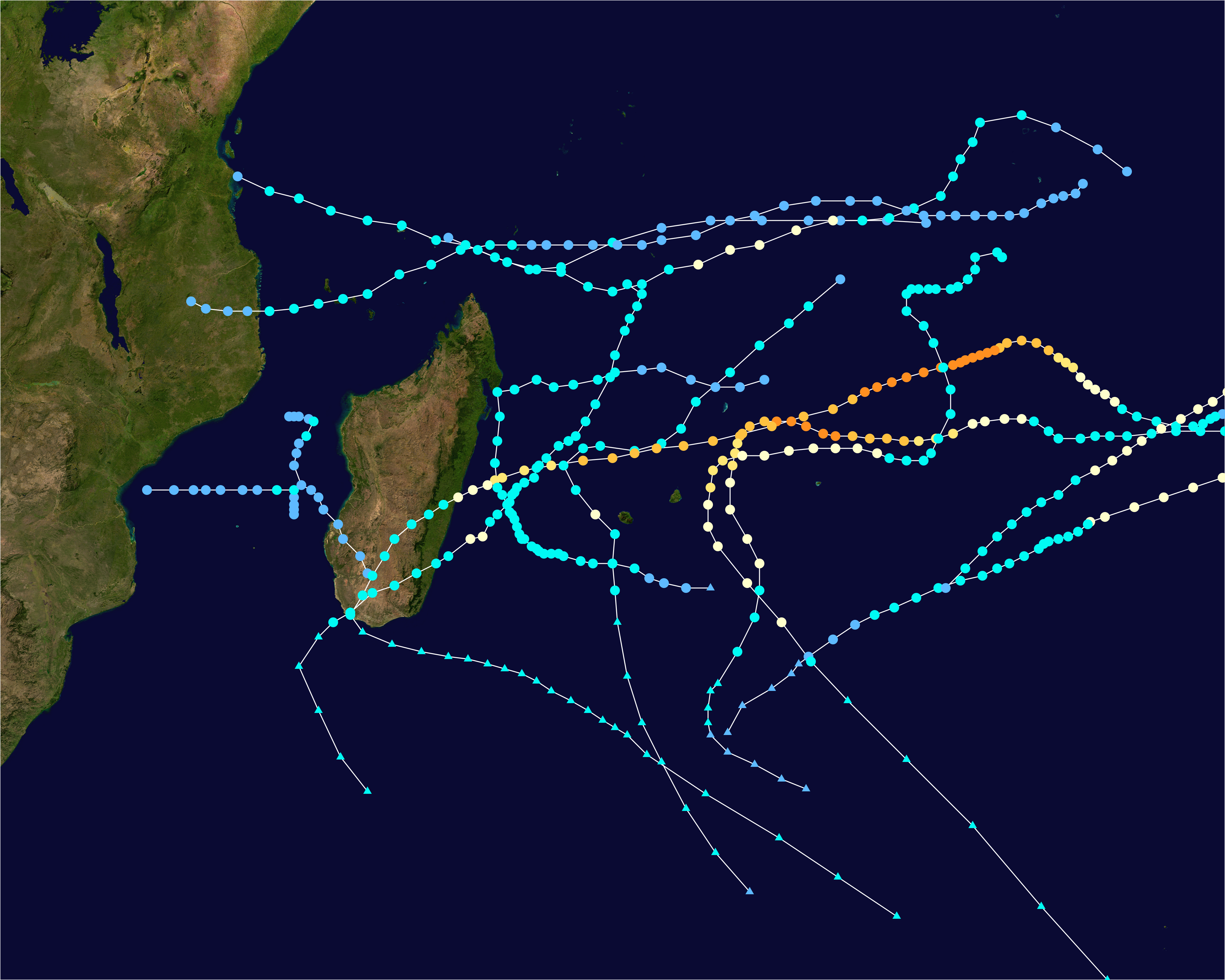
- Season summary map

Seasonal boundaries
- First system formed: August 19, 1969
- Last system dissipated: April 1, 1970

Strongest storm
- Name: Jane
  - Maximum winds: 230 km/h (145 mph) (1-minute sustained)

Seasonal statistics
- Total depressions: 13
- Total storms: 13
- Tropical cyclones: 6
- Intense tropical cyclones: 0
- Very intense tropical cyclones: 2
- Total fatalities: 30
- Total damage: Unknown

Related articles
- 1969–70 Australian region cyclone season; 1969–70 South Pacific cyclone season

The 1969–70 South-West Indian Ocean cyclone season was an active cyclone season.

== Systems ==
=== Severe Tropical Storm Aline ===
- Severe tropical storm (MFR)
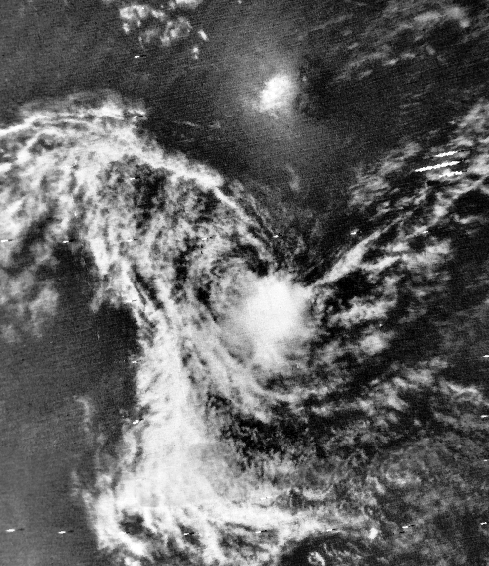
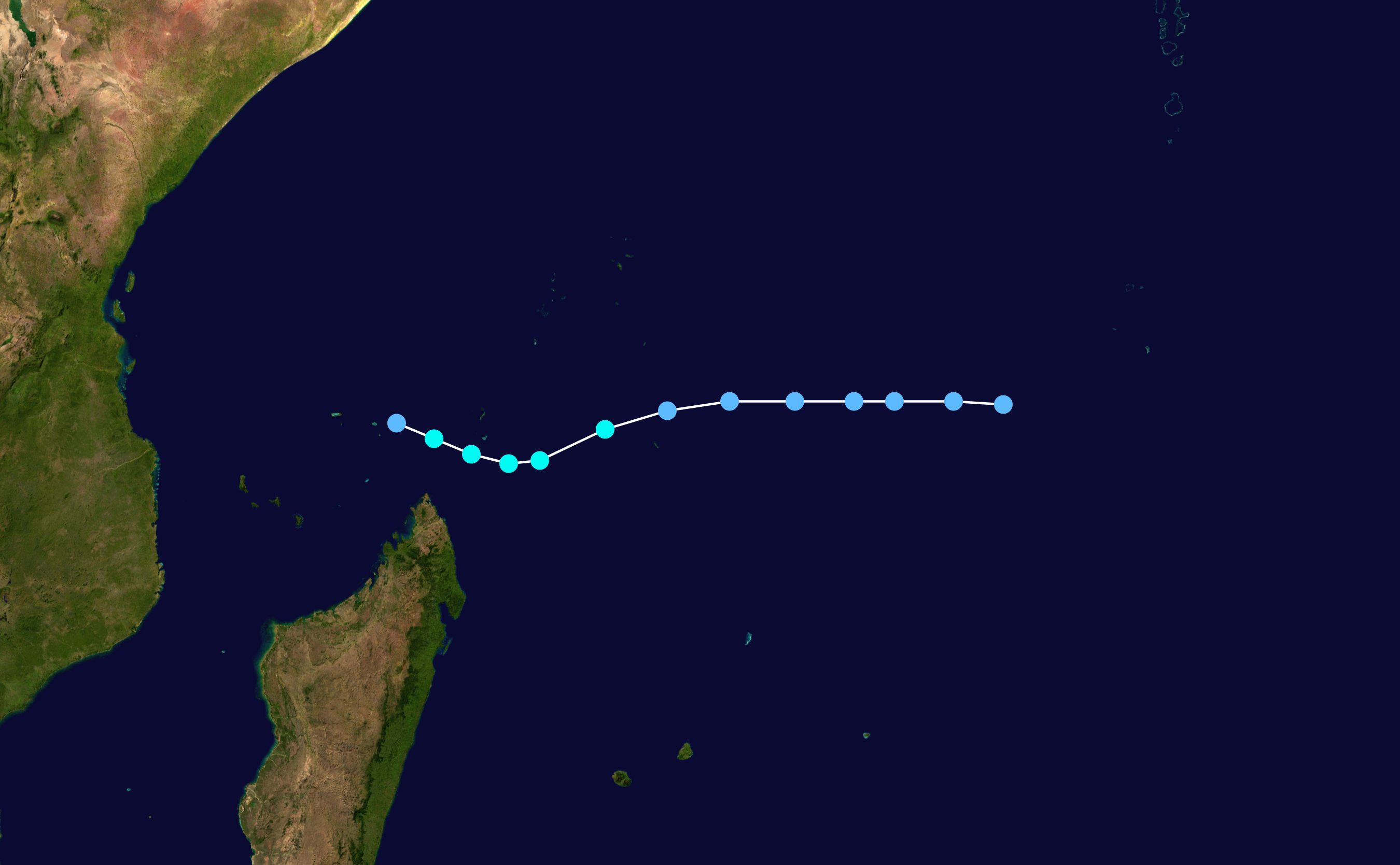
- Duration: August 19 – August 22
- Peak intensity: 100 km/h (65 mph) (10-min);

Aline existed from August 19 to August 22.

=== Tropical Cyclone Blanche ===
- Tropical cyclone (MFR)
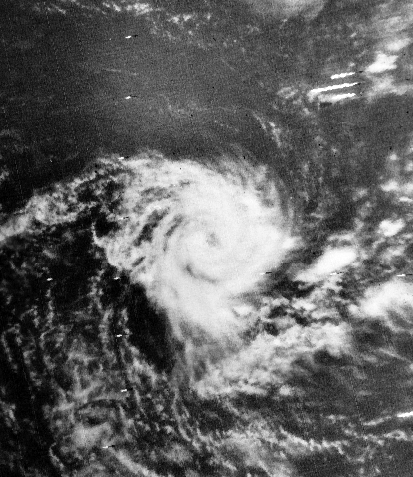
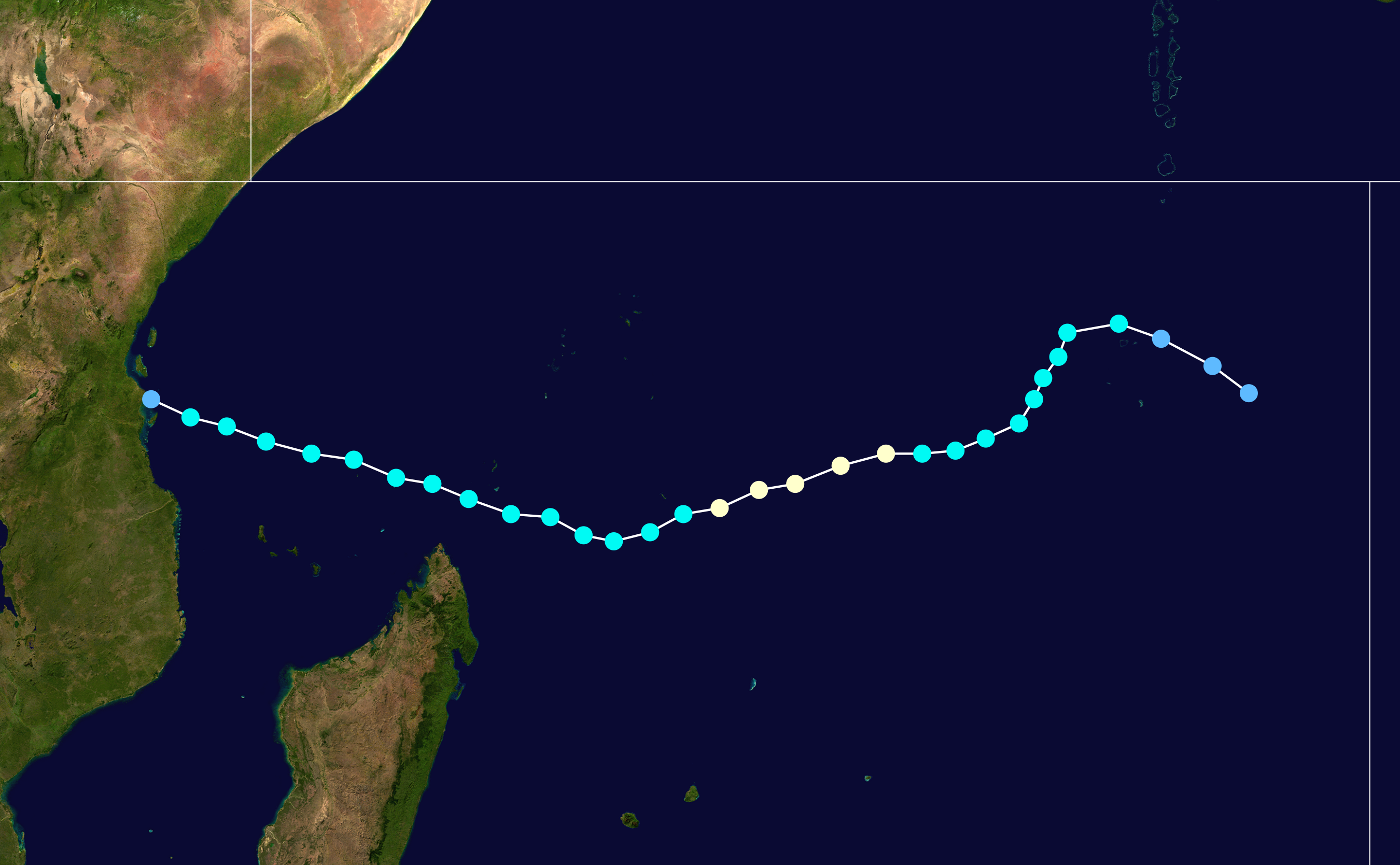
- Duration: October 7 – October 15
- Peak intensity: 130 km/h (80 mph) (10-min);

October 7 to October 15.

=== Moderate Tropical Storm Corrine ===
- Moderate tropical storm (MFR)
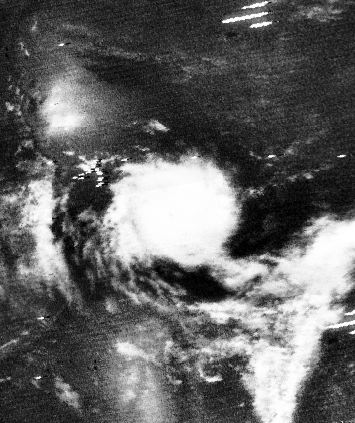
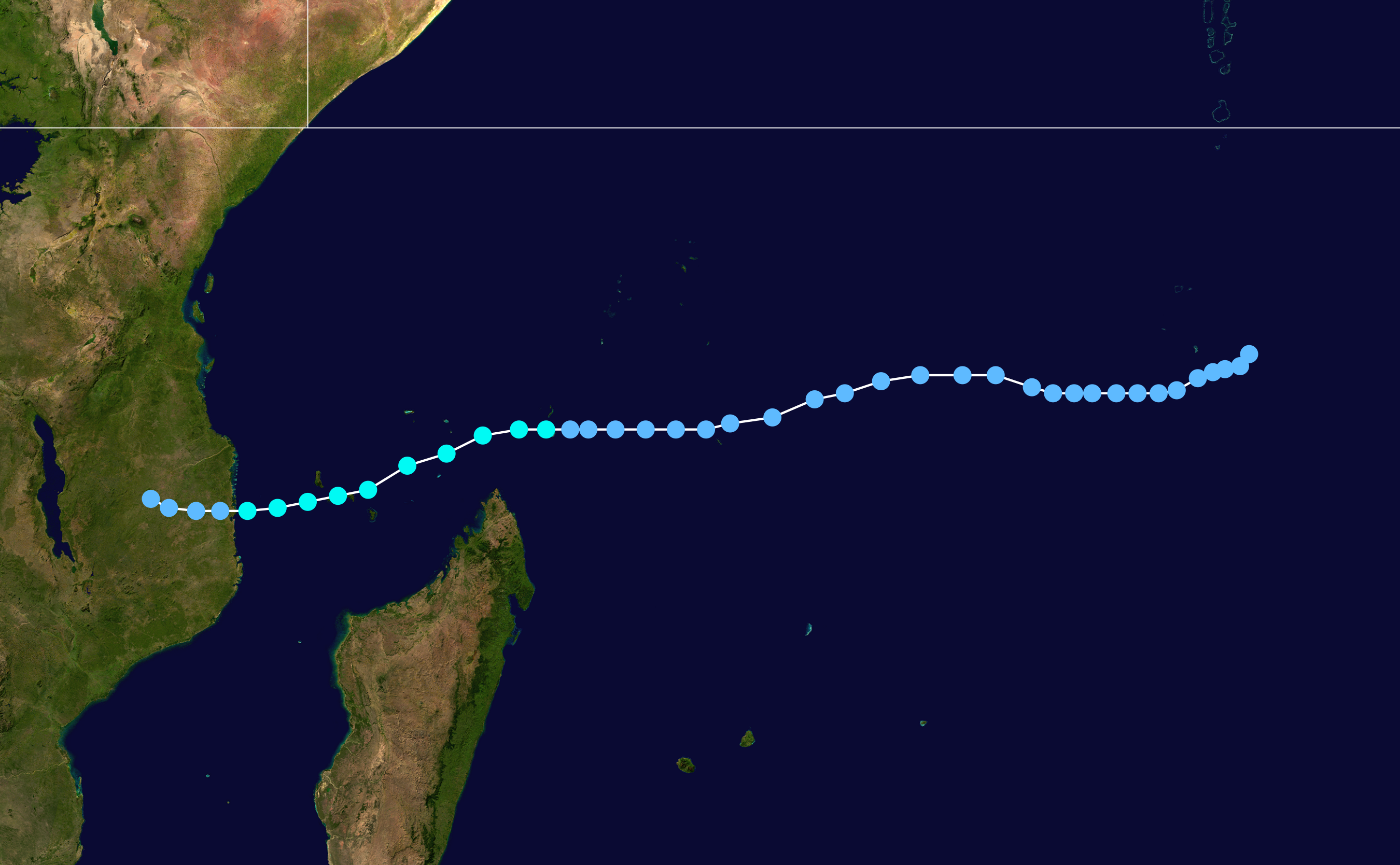
- Duration: November 11 – November 21
- Peak intensity: 85 km/h (50 mph) (10-min);

26 deaths in Comoros and Mozambique.

=== Moderate Tropical Storm Delphine ===
- Moderate tropical storm (MFR)
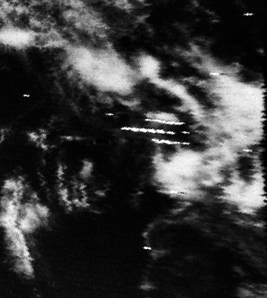
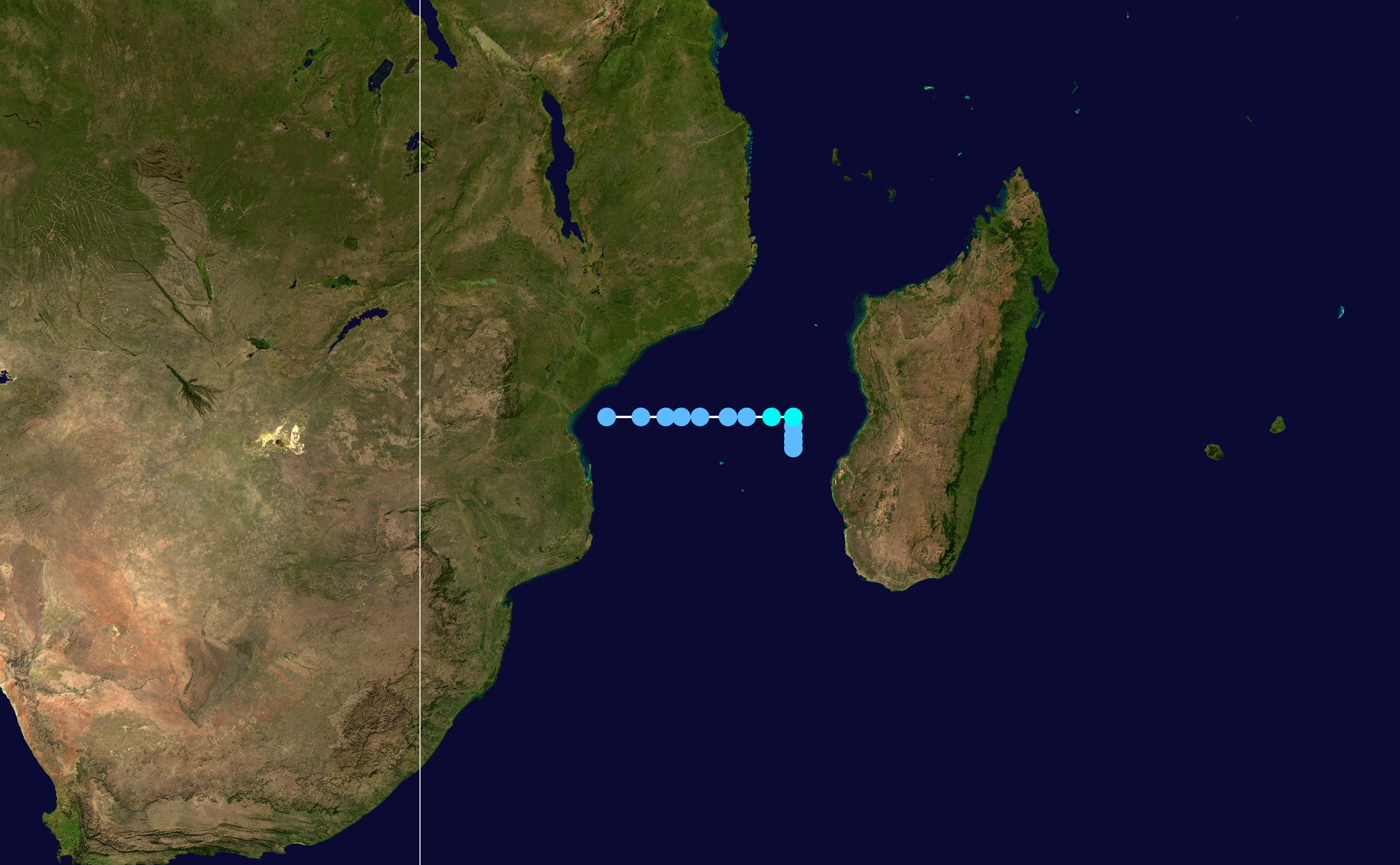
- Duration: December 29 – January 1
- Peak intensity: 65 km/h (40 mph) (10-min);

Delphine existed from December 29 to January 1.

=== Tropical Cyclone Diane–Francoise ===
- Tropical cyclone (MFR)
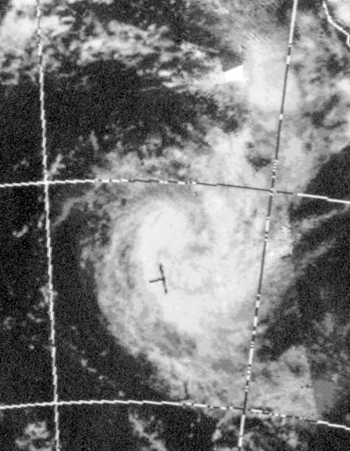
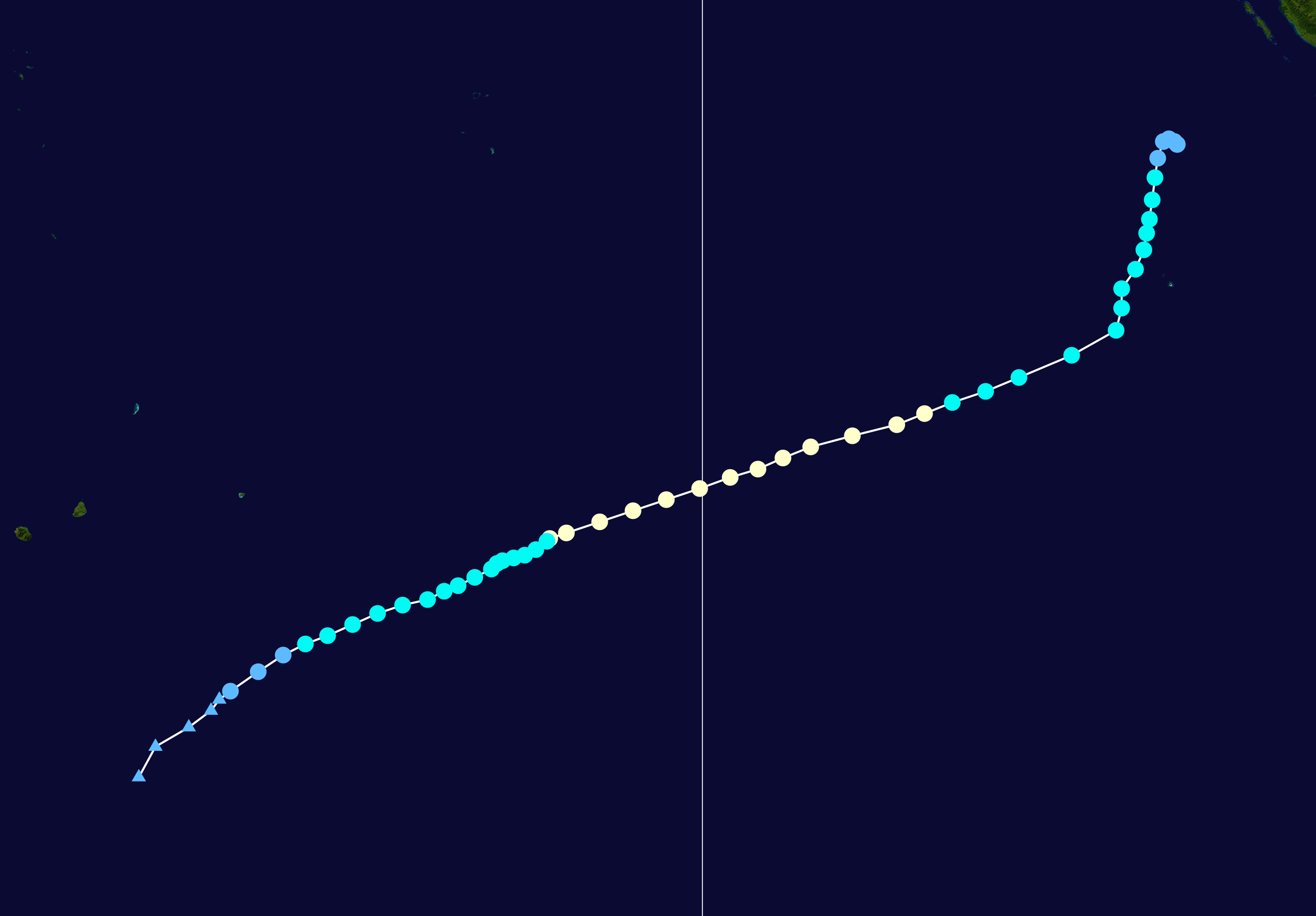
- Duration: January 10 (entered basin) – January 16
- Peak intensity: 130 km/h (80 mph) (10-min);

This system entered the basin on January 7 and dissipated on January 17.

=== Moderate Tropical Storm Eliane ===
- Moderate tropical storm (MFR)
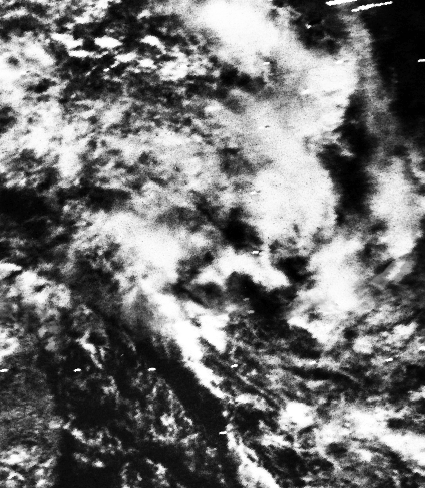
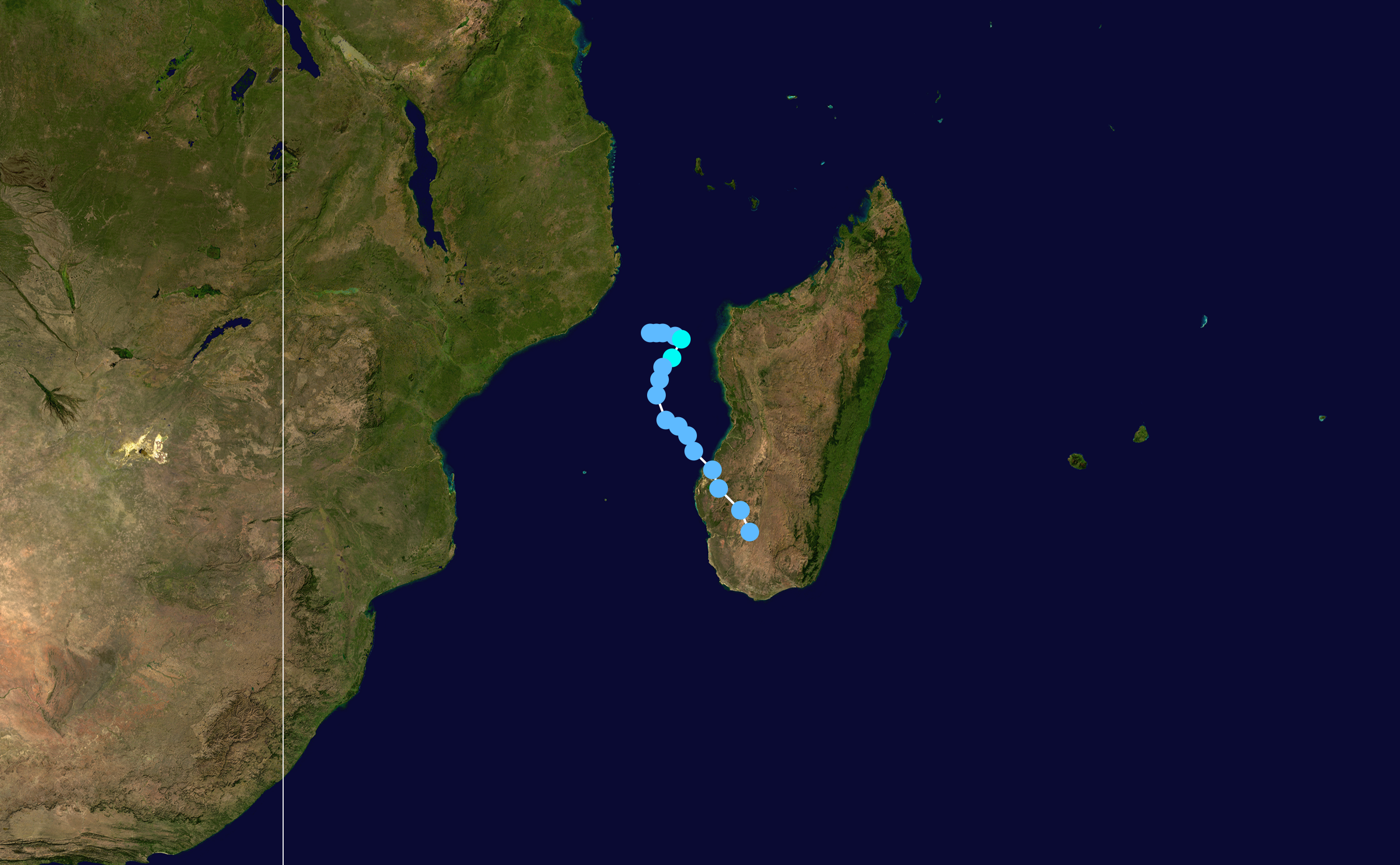
- Duration: January 7 – January 11
- Peak intensity: 65 km/h (40 mph) (10-min);

The storm struck western Madagascar, bringing rainfall.

=== Tropical Cyclone Genevieve ===
- Tropical cyclone (MFR)
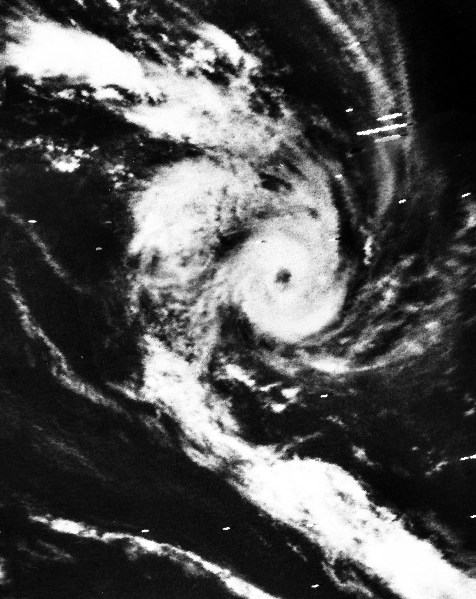
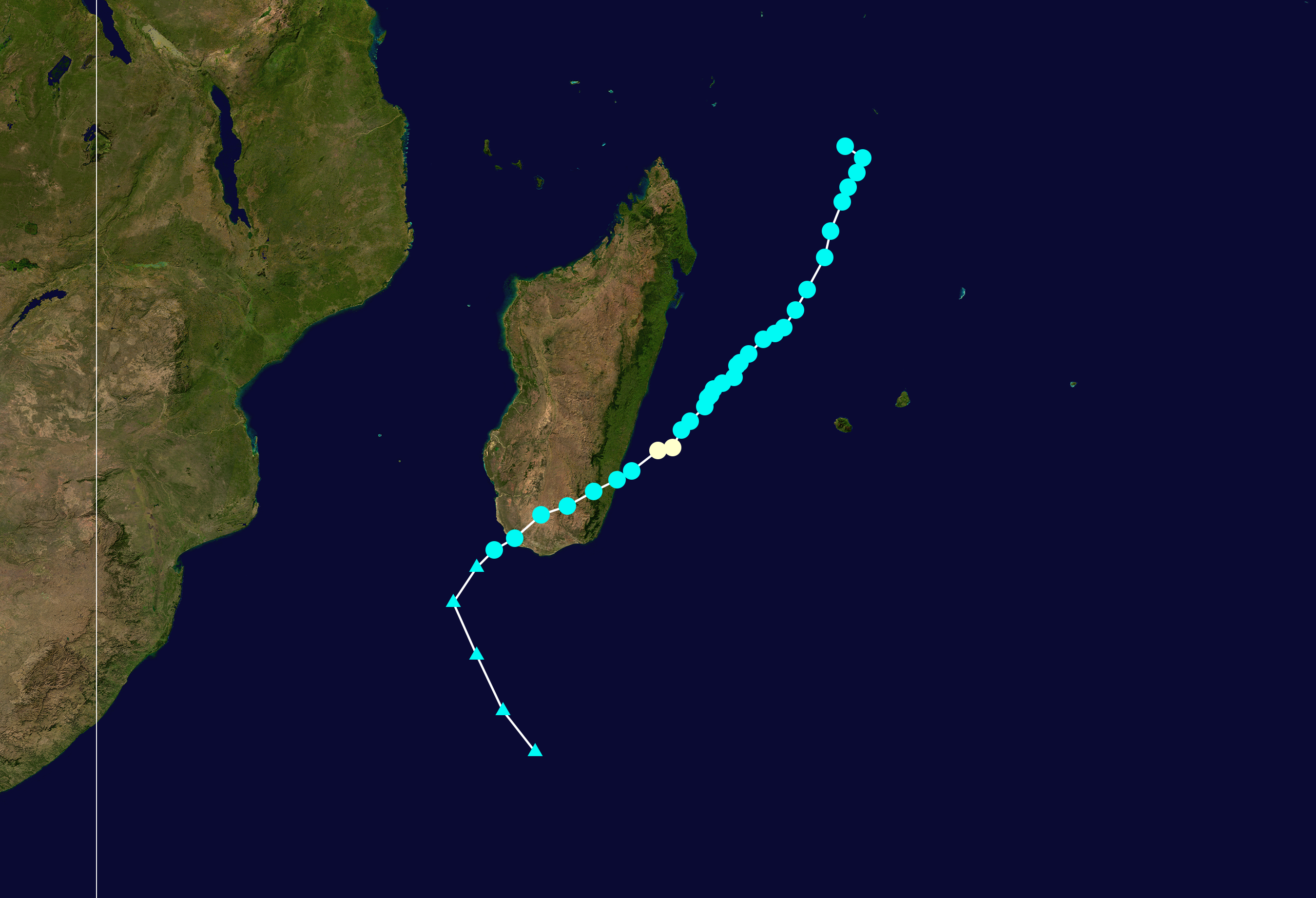
- Duration: January 10 – January 19
- Peak intensity: 120 km/h (75 mph) (10-min);

The cyclone caused four deaths in Madagascar due to flooding. The cyclone peaked as a Moderate Tropical Storm, before weakening and making landfall.

=== Tropical Cyclone Hermine ===
- Tropical cyclone (MFR)
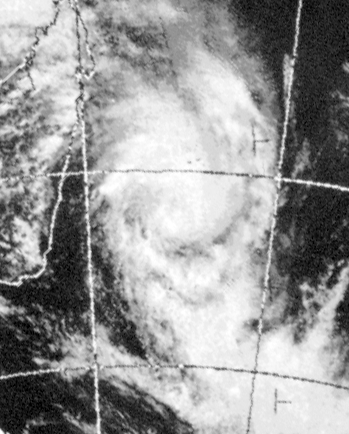
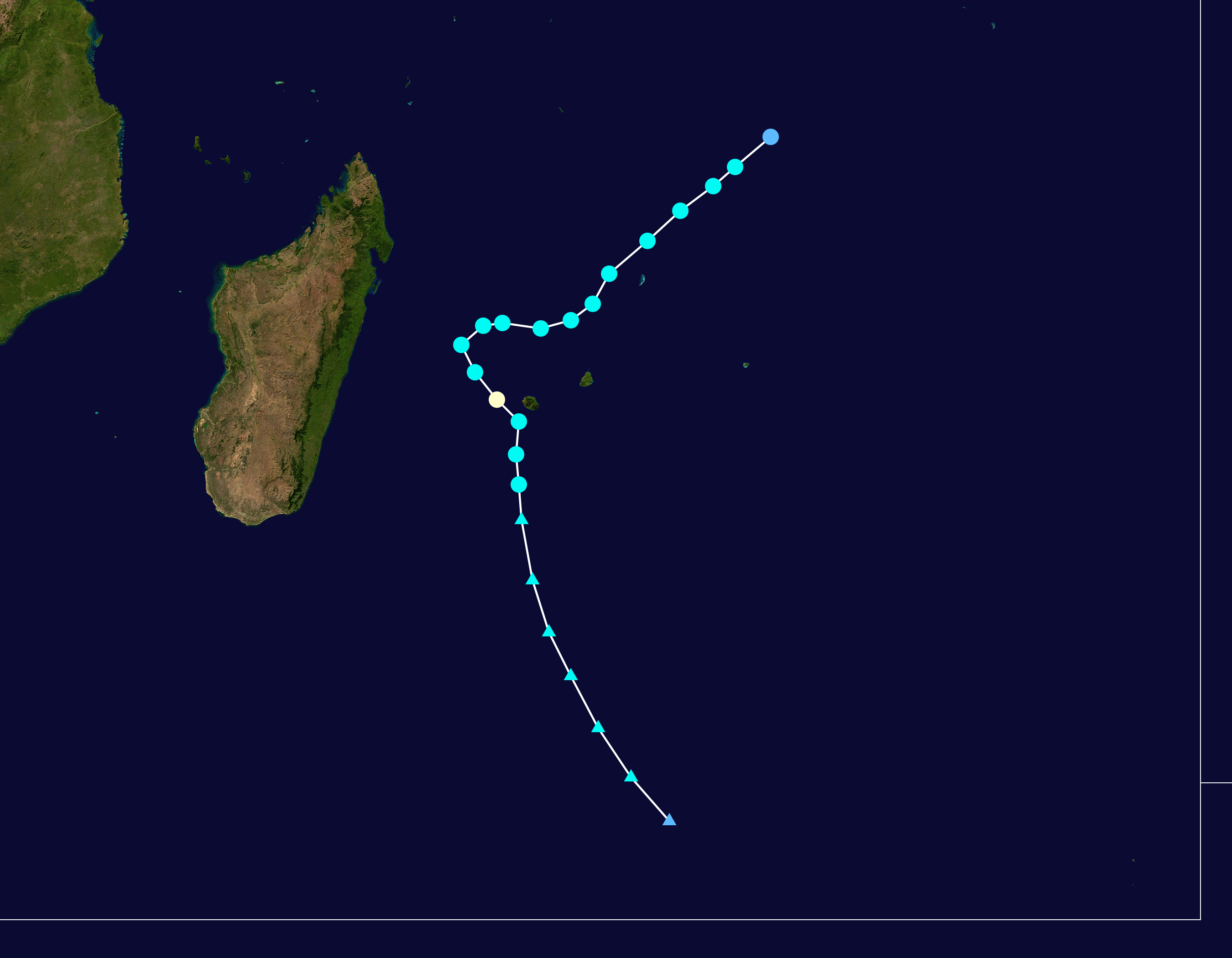
- Duration: January 22 – January 27
- Peak intensity: 120 km/h (75 mph) (10-min);

One death on Reunion.

=== Very Intense Tropical Cyclone Harriet-Iseult ===
- Very intense tropical cyclone (MFR)
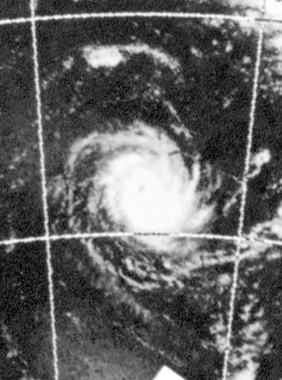
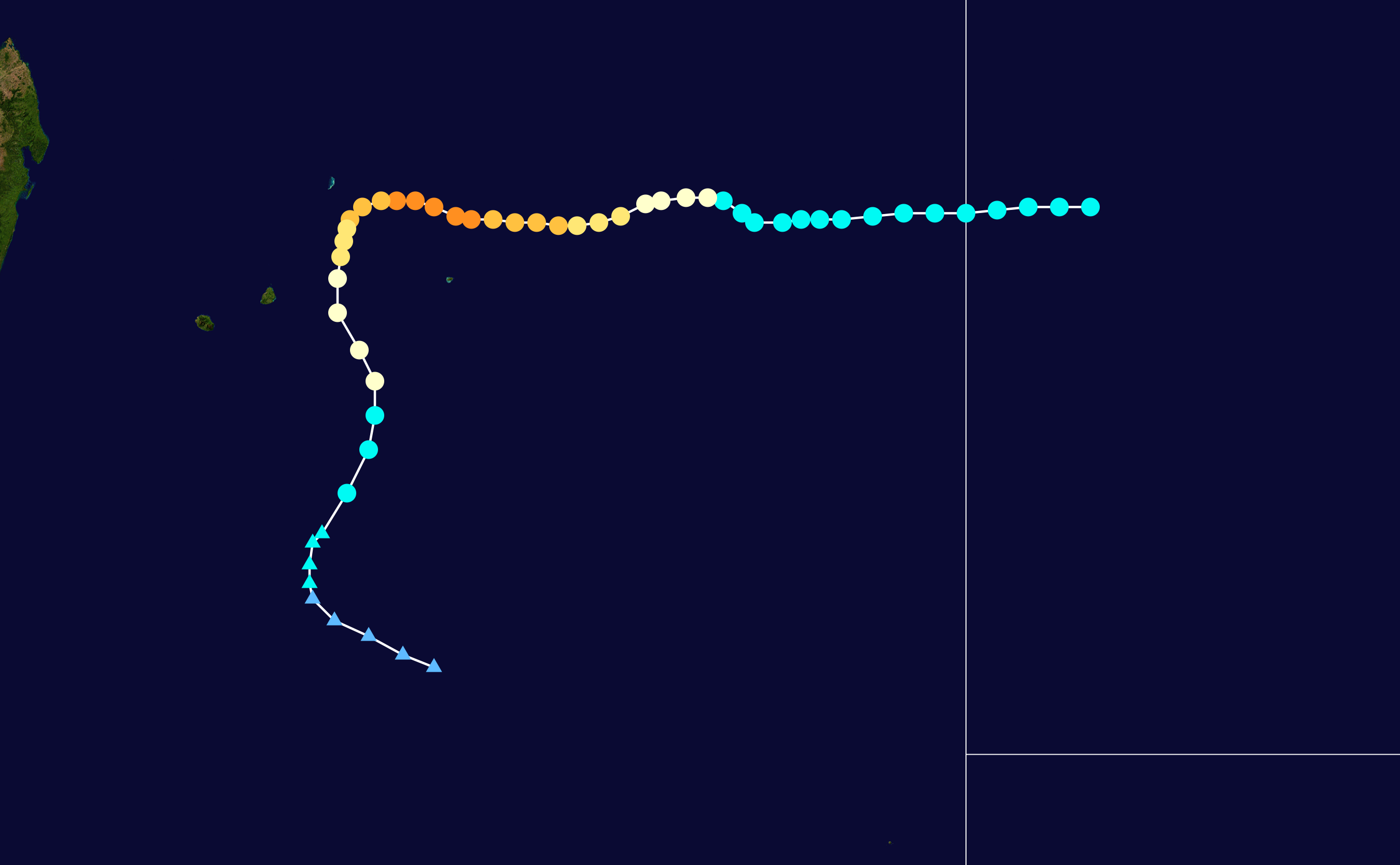
- Duration: February 3 (entered basin) – February 13
- Peak intensity: 220 km/h (140 mph) (10-min);

Iseult existed from February 2 to February 15, staying at sea for its existence.

=== Very Intense Tropical Cyclone Josephine-Jane ===
- Very intense tropical cyclone (MFR)
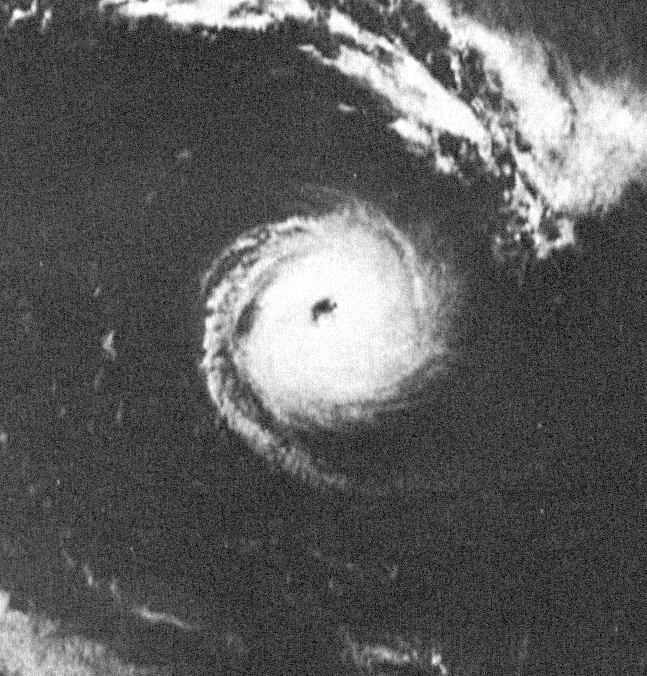
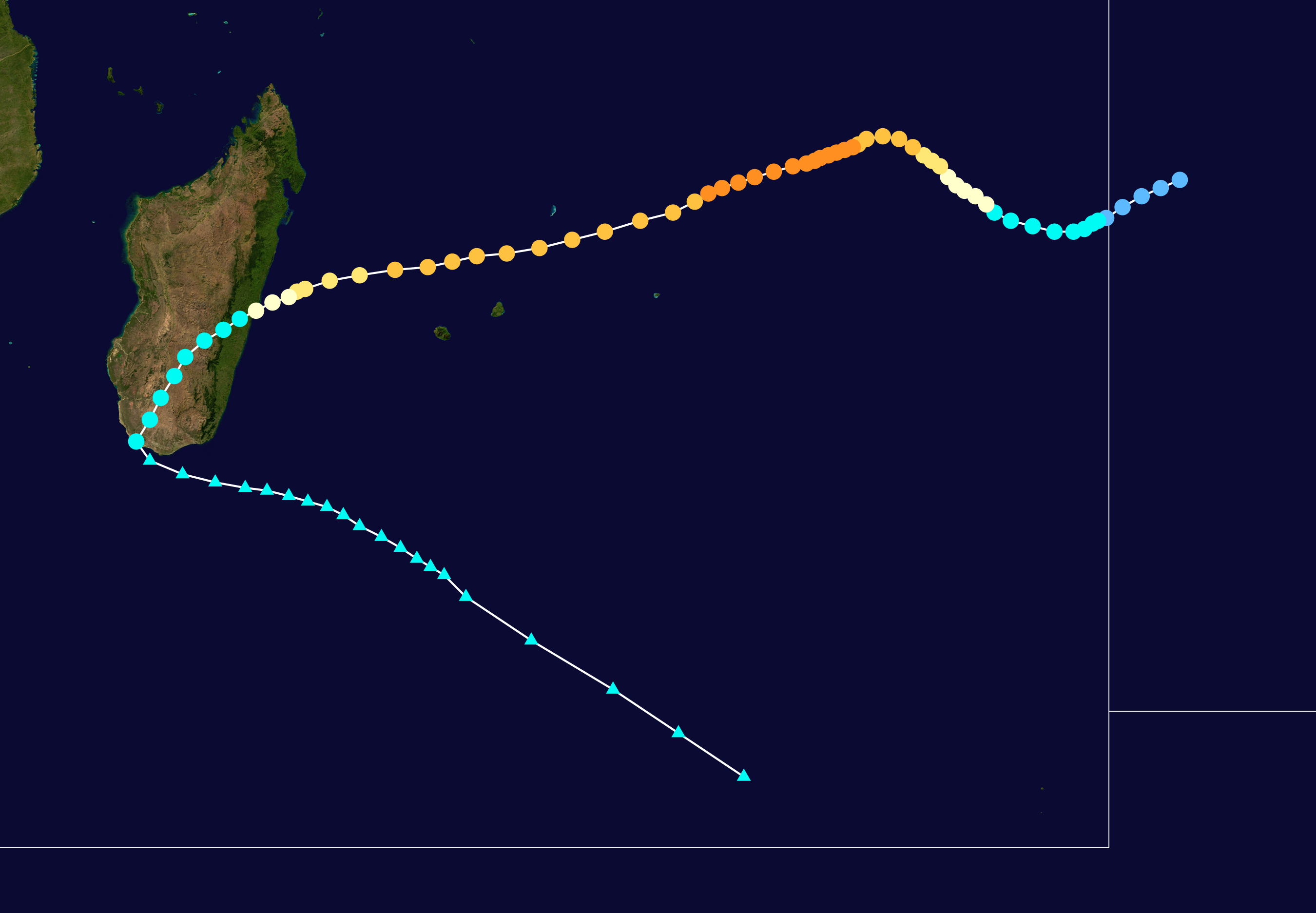
- Duration: February 11 (entered basin) – February 28
- Peak intensity: 230 km/h (145 mph) (10-min);

It was named Josephine in its formative stages due to being in what was considered the Australian basin at the time. The cyclone made landfall in Madagascar, before taking a southeast turn and dissipating.

=== Moderate Tropical Storm Katia ===
- Moderate tropical storm (MFR)
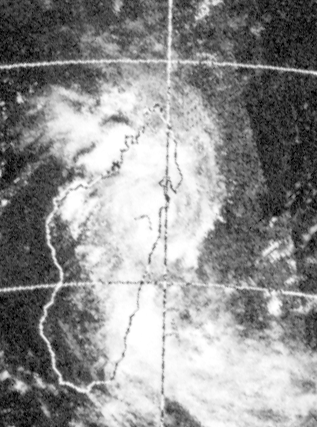
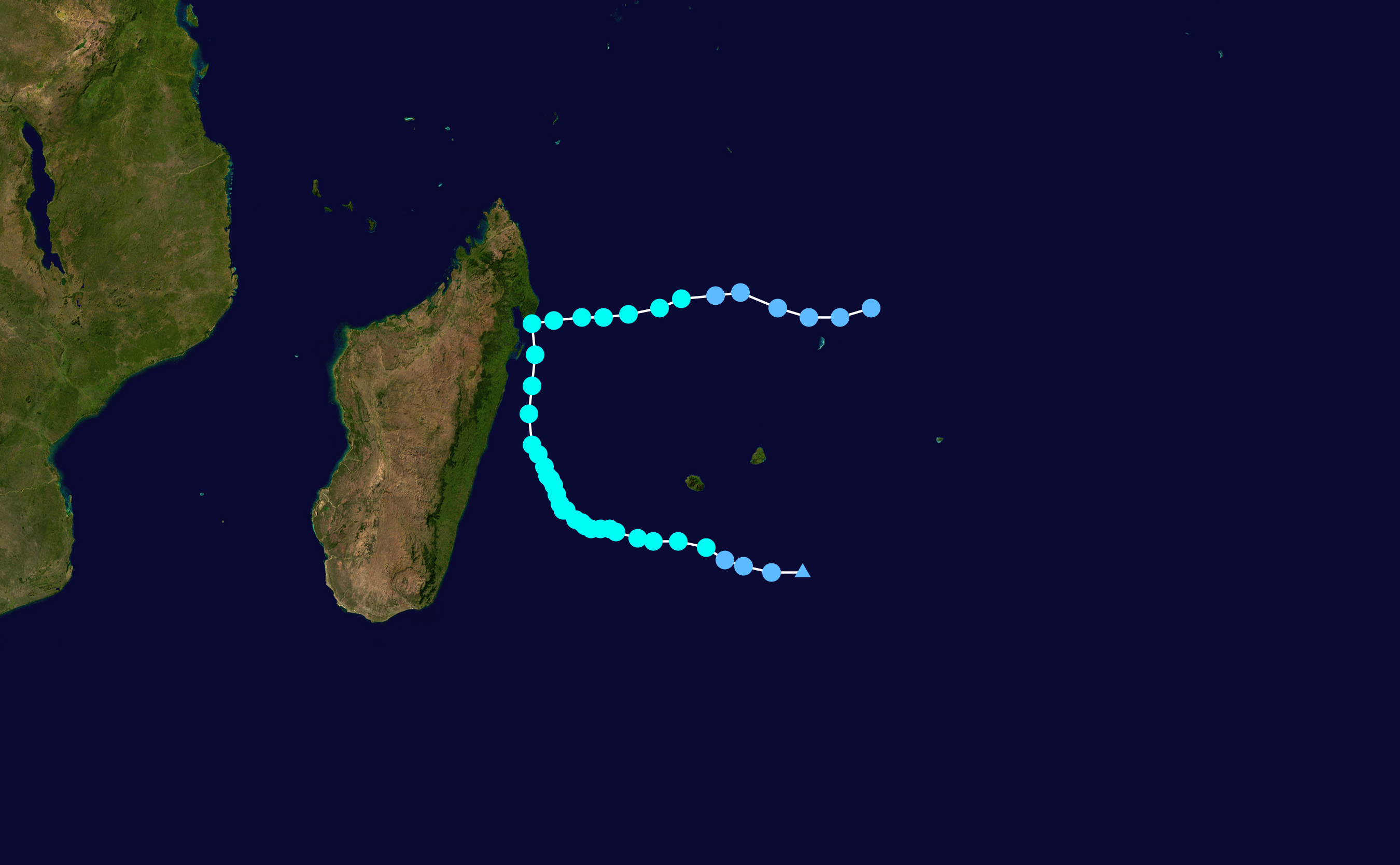
- Duration: March 16 – March 26
- Peak intensity: 85 km/h (50 mph) (10-min);

Katia existed from March 16 to March 26, clipping Madagascar.

=== Tropical Cyclone Louise ===
- Tropical cyclone (MFR)
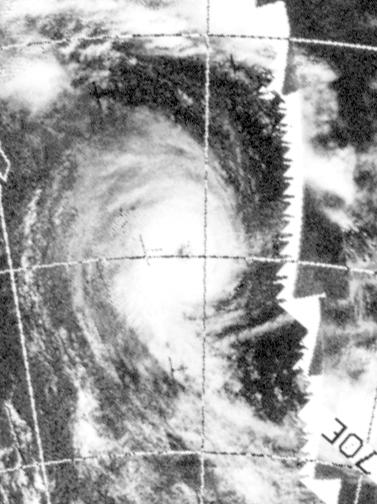
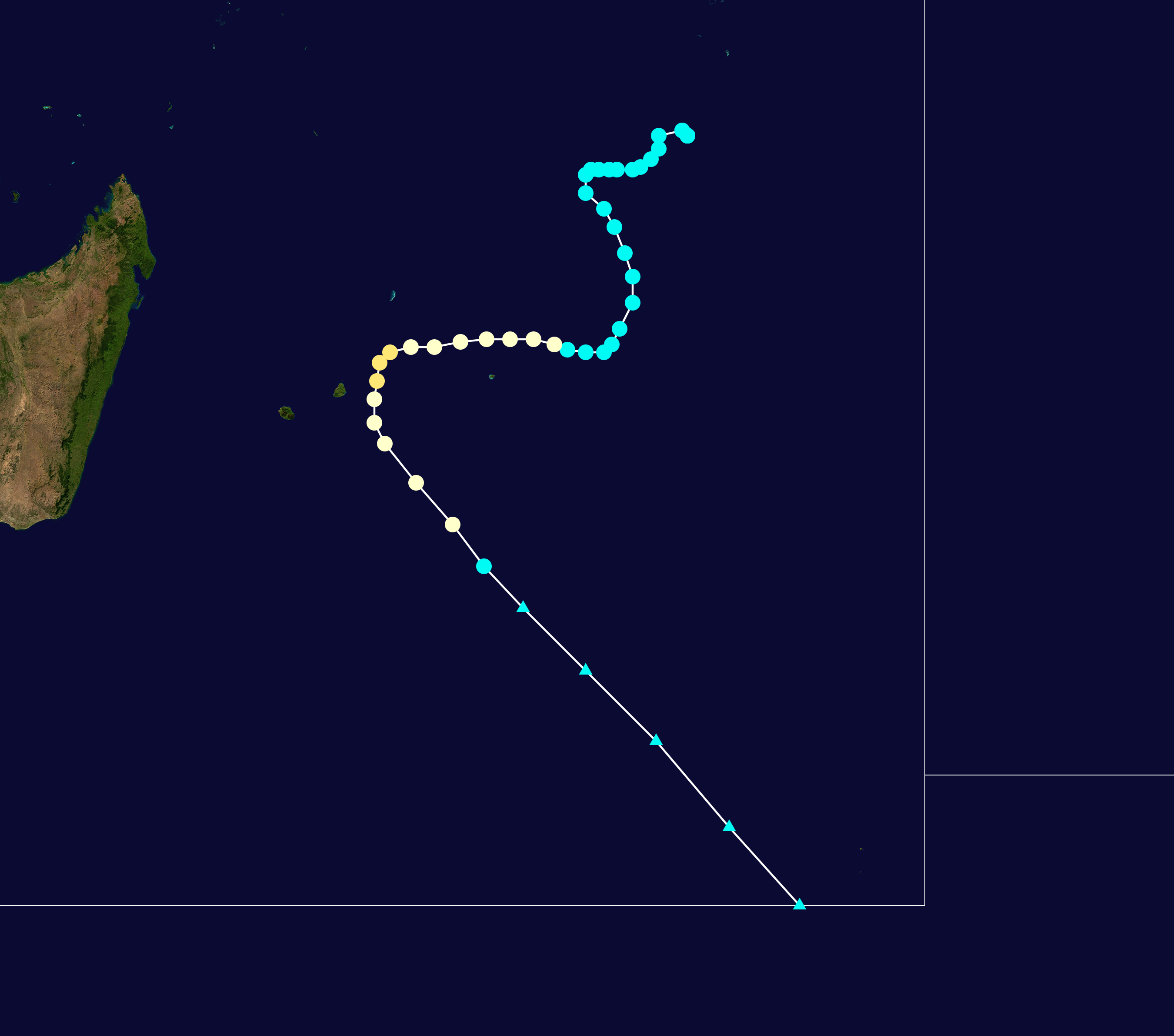
- Duration: March 20 – April 1
- Peak intensity: 155 km/h (100 mph) (10-min);

Louise existed from March 20 to April 1.

=== Tropical Cyclone Kathy–Michelle ===
- Tropical cyclone (MFR)
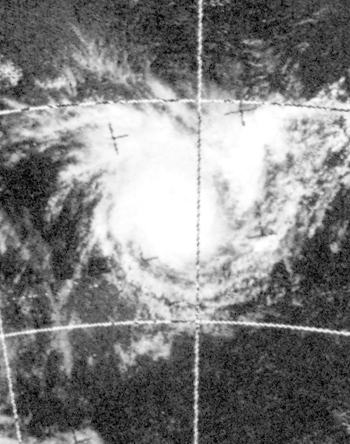
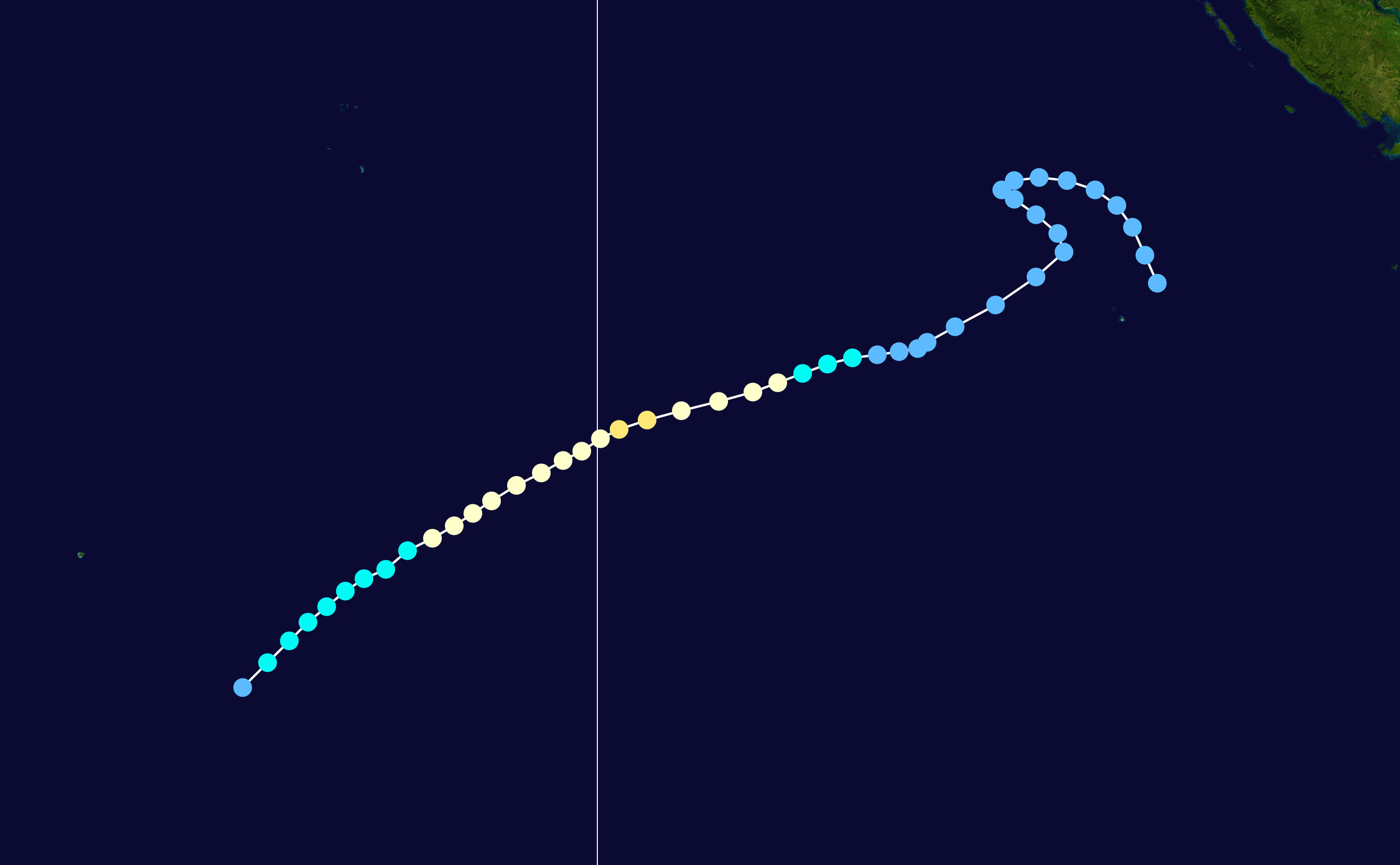
- Duration: March 26 (entered basin) – March 30
- Peak intensity: 140 km/h (85 mph) (10-min);

Michelle entered the basin on March 24 and dissipated on March 30.

== See also ==
- Atlantic hurricane seasons: 1969, 1970
- Eastern Pacific hurricane seasons: 1969, 1970
- Western Pacific typhoon seasons: 1969, 1970
- North Indian Ocean cyclone seasons: 1969, 1970
