= 1969 North Indian Ocean cyclone season =

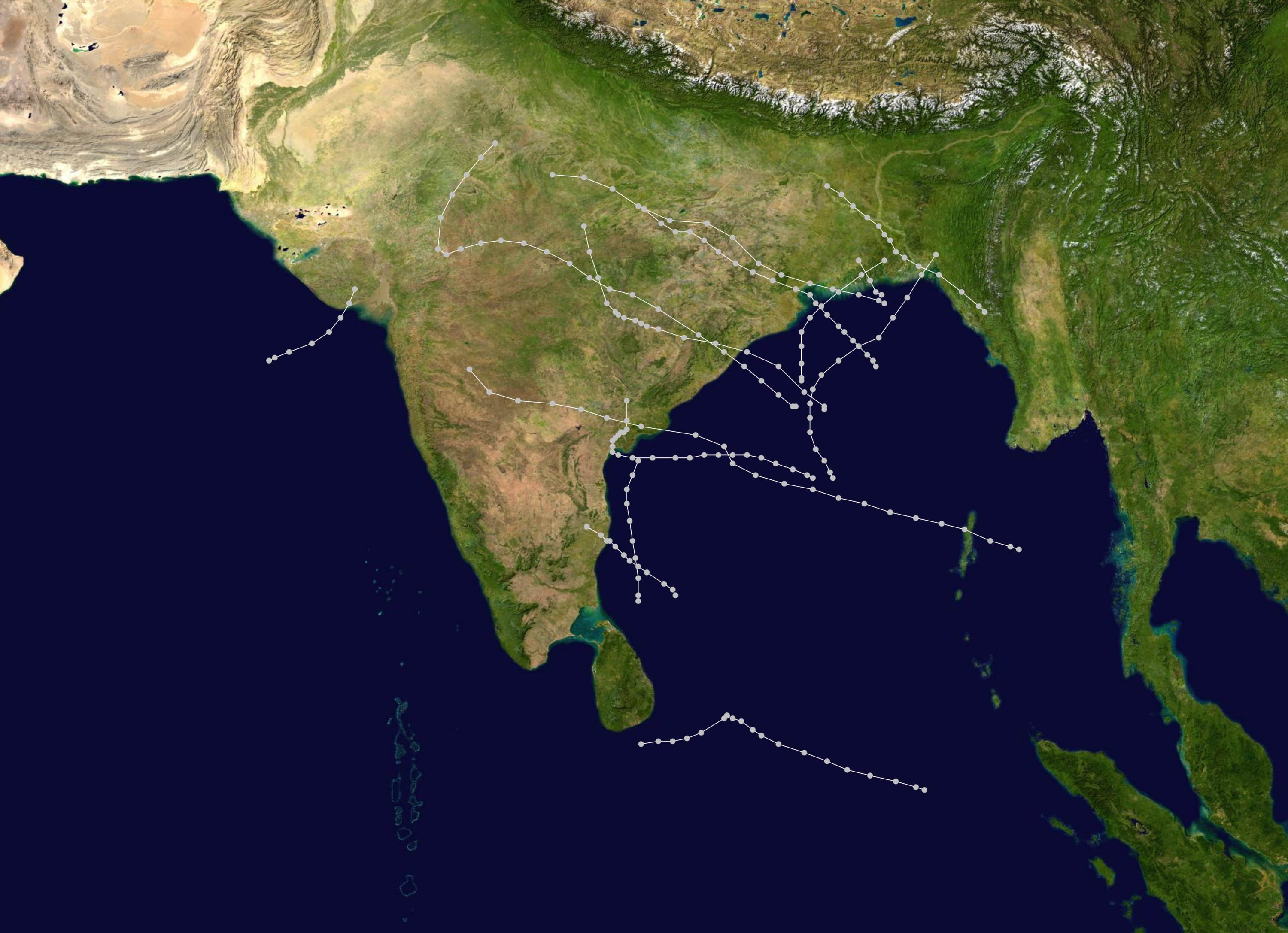
- Season summary map

Seasonal boundaries
- First system formed: Unknown
- Last system dissipated: Unknown

Seasonal statistics
- Depressions: 14
- Cyclonic storms: 5
- Severe cyclonic storms: 1
- Total fatalities: Unknown
- Total damage: Unknown

Related articles
- 1969 Atlantic hurricane season; 1969 Pacific hurricane season; 1969 Pacific typhoon season

The 1969 North Indian Ocean cyclone season was an active cyclone season. The season has no official bounds but cyclones in the northern Indian Ocean tend to form between April and December. There are two main seas in the North Indian Ocean—the Bay of Bengal to the east of the Indian subcontinent and the Arabian Sea to the west of India. The official Regional Specialized Meteorological Centre in this basin is the India Meteorological Department (IMD), while the Joint Typhoon Warning Center releases unofficial advisories. An average of four to six storms form in the North Indian Ocean every season with peaks in May and November. Cyclones occurring between the meridians 45°E and 100°E are included in the season by the IMD.

== Systems ==
=== Cyclonic Storm One ===
- Cyclonic storm (IMD)
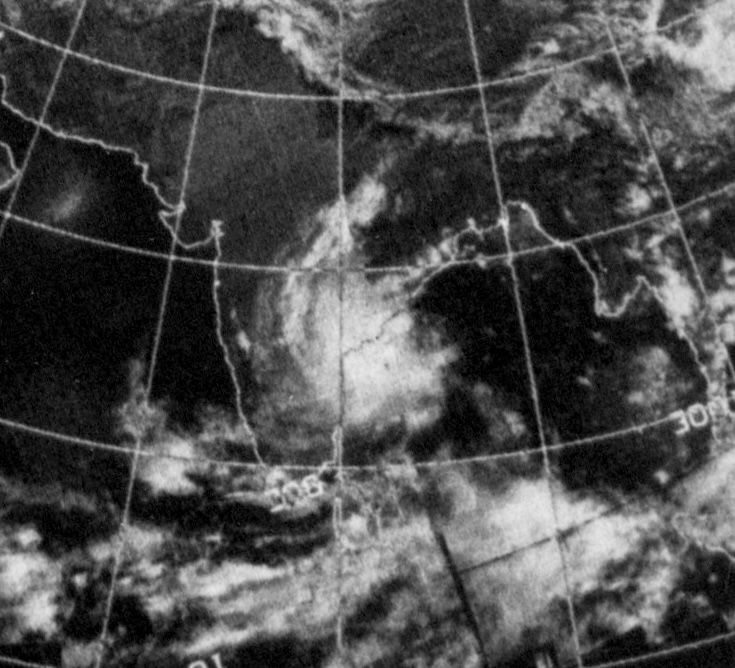
- Duration: May 14 – May 19
- Peak intensity: ≥85 km/h (50 mph) (3-min); 989 hPa (mbar)

A low-pressure area on the Bay of Bengal intensified to a depression on May 14. Moving west-northwest, it further strengthened to a deep depression on the next day, with ships in the area reporting below gale-force winds and a cyclonic storm on May 16. ESSA-8 satellite imageries reported that the storm has winds equivalent to a Category 2 storm at that time, before crossing the coast between Ongole and Masulipatam (now Machilipatnam) on the next day, maintaining its intensity. Inland, it rapidly weakened to a depression and an area of low-pressure on May 19 and 20, respectively.

Heavy rains and gusty winds were reported on the northern parts of Andhra Pradesh, causing widespread destruction and unprecedented floods. Chinnaganjam got the highest rainfall amount from the system, at 31 cm (310 mm). Over 600 individuals and a few lakh heads of cattle were rendered dead as a result of the storm, while many croplands were destroyed. Total loss was estimated to be at a hundred crores of rupees.

=== Depression Two ===
- Depression (IMD)
- Duration: June 5 – June 6
- Peak intensity: 35 km/h (25 mph) (3-min); 998.4 hPa (mbar)

A trough of low-pressure was first located over the east-central portion of Arabian Sea, off Mysore and southern coasts of Maharashtra. It further extended and moved northwards before becoming well-marked by June 3. On the next day, a depression formed from this feature near south Gujarat and north Maharashtra coasts, two days later. This time, it tracked east-northeastwards before crossing land near Diu on June 6, where Veraval recorded its peak winds from the northwest of 35 km/h (25 mph), while its barometric pressure toppled at 998.9 hPa (29.50 inHg) on Mahuva. It subsequently weakened to a low-pressure area that day.

Under the influence of the system, the monsoon advanced on the Arabian Sea, particularly on Maharashtra and south Gujarat coasts from June 6 – 7.

=== Depression Three ===
- Deep depression (IMD)
- Duration: June 16 – June 20
- Peak intensity: 55 km/h (35 mph) (3-min); 1001.8 hPa (mbar)

A cyclonic circulation formed over the Bay of Bengal on June 15. This feature spawned a low-pressure area on the basin which intensified to a depression on the evening of the next day. Ship ATAF reported winds of 55 km/h (35 mph), a minimum pressure of 1001.8 hPa (29.58 inHg) and intermittent rains on that day. Its wind speeds were equivalent of a modern-day deep depression; however, the IMD treated the system a depression, as such. Later, it slowed down as it moved northwards before taking a northwesterly turn as it accelerated towards East Pakistan (now Bangladesh). On July 20 in the night, it made landfall on the country near Chittagong before rapidly weakening to a low-pressure area and merging with the seasonal trough over Assam.

Widespread rainfall were reported on Assam on July 20 as a result of the system.

=== Deep Depression Four ===
- Deep depression (IMD)
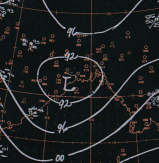
- Duration: July 28 – August 1
- Peak intensity: Winds not specified; 990.7 hPa (mbar)

After a month-long inactivity over the basin, a low-pressure area developed over the northwest portion of the Bay of Bengal on July 26. It became well-marked by that evening and a depression on July 28. Moving northwestward, it further became a deep depression on the next day, with Sandheads recording a minimum pressure of 990.7 hPa (29.26 inHg) that day. ESSA-8 satellite imagery on July 29 depicted that the bands of the system located on all of its peripheries. Before the afternoon of the next day, it moved over Balasore while continuing its movement before weakening to a depression over Ambikapur, Chhattisgarh that evening. It shifted its movement towards the west on July 31 before degrading further to a low-pressure area over Madhya Pradesh on the first day of August.

Under the storm's influence, the monsoon further became active in eastern Madhya Pradesh and Orissa (now Odisha). Bhubaneshwar recorded the heaviest rainfall from the system on July 30 at 28 cm (280 mm), while its remnants produced light downpour at Narmadapuram and Pachmarhi on August 2. According to press reports, these rains caused flooding on many districts in Orissa, Madhya Pradesh and Jagdalpur. Villages in these areas and near rivers were inundated and traffics were affected.

=== Depression Five ===
- Depression (IMD)
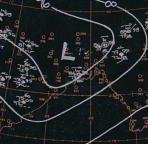
- Duration: August 8 – August 8

An area of low-pressure formed in the Bay of Bengal on August 7. It became well-marked that evening and further strengthened to a depression on the next day. Moving northwest, the system crossed the coast over Sundarbans before rapidly weakening back to a low-pressure area that day. It then moved over Uttar Pradesh on August 12, where it was last noted.

The system caused an active monsoon condition in Orissa and the Gangetic West Bengal on August 8–10. Dhanbad on August 9 reported the highest rainfall from the depression, standing at 12 cm (4.7 in).

=== Cyclonic Storm Six ===
- Severe cyclonic storm (IMD)
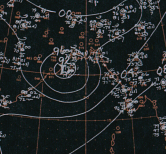
- Duration: August 13 – August 16
- Peak intensity: 95 km/h (60 mph) (3-min); 990 hPa (mbar)

An upper air cyclonic circulation formed over East Pakistan and the adjoining Bay of Bengal on August 12 in the morning. A low-pressure area subsequently developed on that evening before strengthening to a depression on the next day. Meteorological analysis revealed that there was a fall in pressure at that time inland the Gangetic West Bengal and Orissa. While moving west-northwestwards, it rapidly intensified to a cyclonic storm near Chuksar Island, or south-southwest of Sagar Island. Sandheads reported winds of 95 km/h (60 mph) that day, well equivalent to a severe cyclonic storm in the modern-day NIO scale, while its pressure bottomed at 990 hPa (29.23 inHg) at 17:30 IST. Continuing its course, it crossed north Orissa near Balasore that night before weakening to a deep depression, about 100 kilometres to the south of Jamshedpur. As it changed its movement towards the northwest, it further weakened to a depression before degenerating to an area of low-pressure over northwest Madhya Pradesh and the adjoining southwest Uttar Pradesh on August 16 in the evening.

The influence of the cyclone caused active monsoon conditions on Gangetic West Bengal, Bihar, eastern Madhya Pradesh, Orissa and east Rajasthan from August 13–17. Chandabali got the highest amount of rainfall from the storm, at 23 cm (9.1 in) on August 14. Meanwhile, as east Rajasthan was impacted by these rains, particularly the districts of Chittorgarh and Jhalawar, it caused flooding that caused road communication problems.

=== Depression Seven ===
- Depression (IMD)
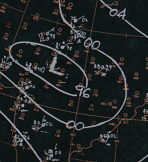
- Duration: September 6 – September 11

After almost another month of no activity on the basin, an east–west trough located over north Indian peninsula and a well-marked trough line over 17.0 N spawned a cyclonic circulation on September 4. A low-pressure area formed from this feature on that day before strengthening to a depression, two days later. Moving to the northwest, the storm didn't strengthen much and crossed Orissa near Gopalpur on September 7 in the morning. Despite tracking inland, a 09:13 IST ESSA-8 satellite imagery revealed a cyclonic circulation over Gujarat. Later moving in a north-northeast movement after tracking west-northwestwards and northwards, it weakened further to an area of low-pressure on September 11 before merging into the seasonal trough on the evening of the next day.

In association with the troughs, the monsoon further advanced through Haryana, Maharashtra, Gujarat, Punjab, Uttar Pradesh, western Madhya Pradesh, Orissa, the coastal areas of Andhra Pradesh, Bihar Plateau and the Gangetic West Bengal from September 5–13. Alwar in Rajasthan reported the highest rain accumulation from the storm at 22 cm (220 mm) on September 10.

=== Depression Eight ===
- Depression (IMD)
- Duration: September 18 – September 23

=== Deep Depression Nine ===
- Deep depression (IMD)
- Duration: September 23 – September 26
- Peak intensity: 55 km/h (35 mph) (3-min); 1006.1 hPa (mbar)

=== Cyclonic Storm Ten ===
- Cyclonic storm (IMD)
- Duration: October 9 – October 11
- Peak intensity: 75 km/h (45 mph) (3-min); 1000 hPa (mbar)

=== Cyclonic Storm Eleven ===
- Cyclonic storm (IMD)
- Duration: October 21 – October 23
- Peak intensity: 85 km/h (50 mph) (3-min); 995 hPa (mbar)

=== Severe Cyclonic Storm Twelve ===
- Extremely severe cyclonic storm (IMD)
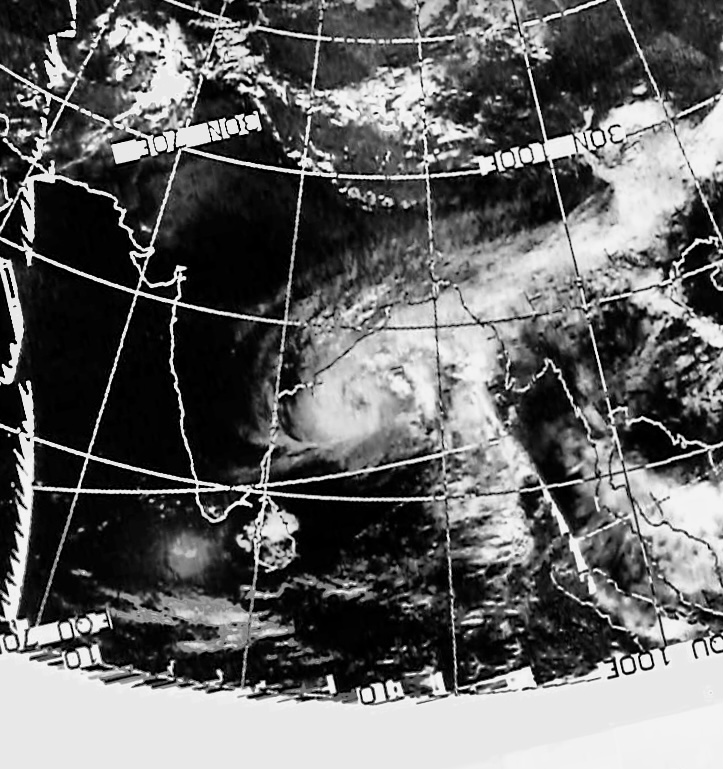
- Duration: November 4 – November 9
- Peak intensity: 175 km/h (110 mph) (3-min); 970 hPa (mbar)

Storms in May and November struck Andhra Pradesh, killing 858 people.

=== Depression Thirteen ===
- Depression (IMD)
- Duration: December 11 – December 13

=== Deep Depression Fourteen ===
- Deep depression (IMD)
- Duration: December 21 – December 26
- Peak intensity: 55 km/h (35 mph) (3-min); 995 hPa (mbar)

== See also ==
- North Indian Ocean tropical cyclone
- List of tropical cyclone records
- 1969 Atlantic hurricane season
- 1969 Pacific hurricane season
- 1969 Pacific typhoon season
- Australian cyclone seasons: 1969–70
- South Pacific cyclone seasons: 1969–70
- South-West Indian Ocean cyclone seasons: 1969–70
