= 1969 Pacific hurricane season =

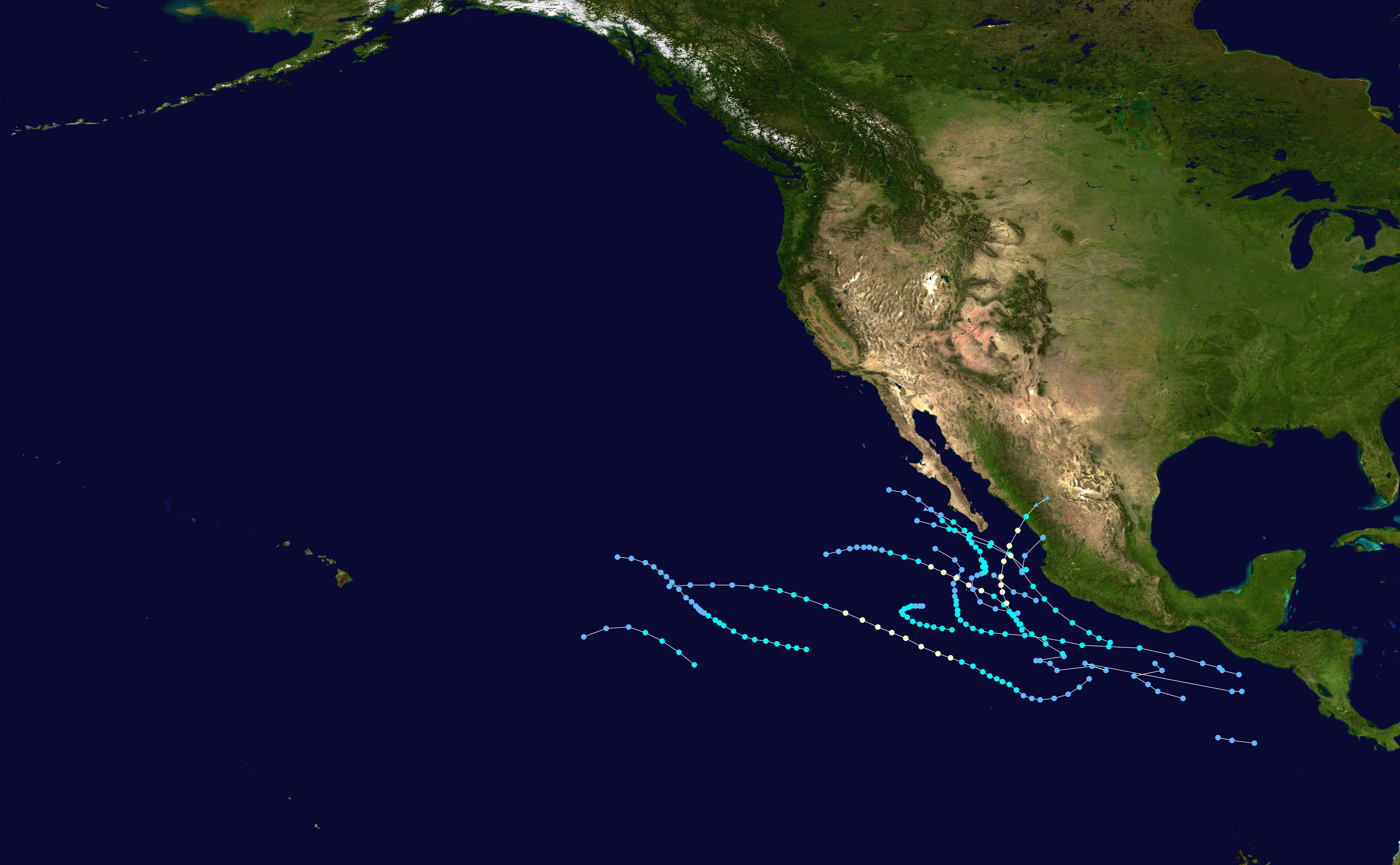
- Season summary map

Seasonal boundaries
- First system formed: May 30, 1969
- Last system dissipated: October 12, 1969

Strongest storm
- Name: Doreen
  - Maximum winds: 85 mph (140 km/h) (1-minute sustained)
  - Lowest pressure: 993 mbar (hPa; 29.32 inHg)

Seasonal statistics
- Total depressions: 15
- Total storms: 10
- Hurricanes: 4
- Total fatalities: 1 direct, 9 indirect
- Total damage: Unknown

Related articles
- 1969 Atlantic hurricane season; 1969 Pacific typhoon season; 1969 North Indian Ocean cyclone season

The 1969 Pacific hurricane season had below average tropical cyclone activity, with only ten named storms forming; most of these storms never approached land. Only four named storms reached hurricane strength, of which none became a major hurricane. It officially started on May 15, 1969, in the eastern Pacific Ocean (east of 140°W in the Northern Hemisphere), and ended on November 30, 1969. These dates conventionally delimit the period of each year when most tropical cyclones form east of this region of the Pacific. The first named storm of the season, Tropical Storm Ava, developed on July 1, and the last, Hurricane Jennifer, dissipated on October 23. At the time, Ava was the latest forming first named storm in any Eastern Pacific season on record.

Notable storms of the 1969 Pacific hurricane season included Tropical Storm Emily and Hurricane Jennifer. The precursor disturbance of Emily killed nine people in Mexico and left 100,000 homeless. Hurricane Jennifer was the only landfalling named storm of the season, causing one death. In this season, only three storms (Ava, Bernice, and Florence) were operationally categorized as tropical depressions at the first advisory. All other storms were operationally upgraded directly to storm strength, bypassing the depression stage.

== Systems ==
=== Tropical Depression One ===
- Tropical depression (SSHWS)
- Duration: May 30 – May 31
- Peak intensity: 35 mph (55 km/h) (1-min);

The first depression of the season formed off the coast of Mexico on May 30 and moved westward. The depression dissipated the next day.

=== Tropical Depression Two ===
- Tropical depression (SSHWS)
- Duration: June 4 – June 8
- Peak intensity: 35 mph (55 km/h) (1-min);

Tropical Depression Two formed on June 4 and lasted until June 5, when the storm was considered dissipated. The depression would regenerate on June 7, but, like its previous time active, only lasted until the day later, only this time, the depression never regenerated.

=== Tropical Storm Ava ===
- Tropical storm (SSHWS)
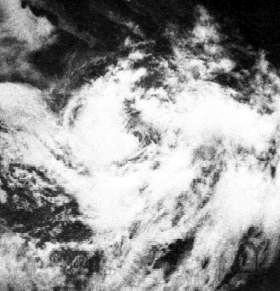
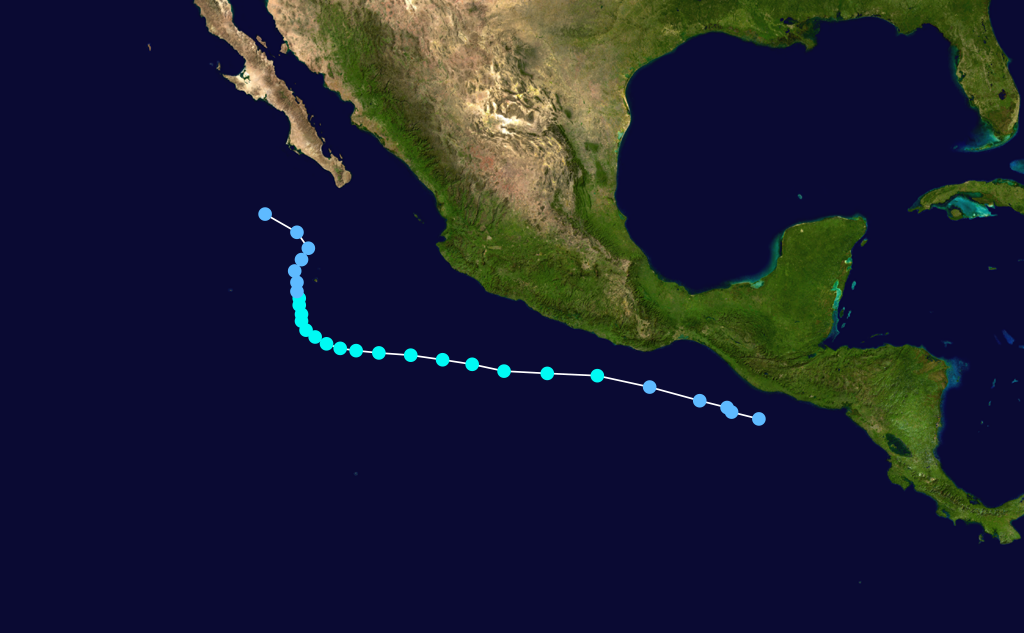
- Duration: July 1 – July 8
- Peak intensity: 50 mph (85 km/h) (1-min); ≤999 mbar (hPa)

On June 30, an area of convection formed off the coast of Guatemala. The system showed no signs of development when June ended, but on July 1 the storm began gaining organization and, after a circulation had developed, was deemed a tropical depression. The depression further intensified, becoming a tropical storm on July 2. Ava tracked west-northwestward at a pace of 17 mph (27 km/h) while going through steady intensification. Ava then began to decelerate in forward motion, and after the storm had turned to a more northward path, reached its peak intensity of 50 mph (80 km/h) on July 5. On July 7, Ava was downgraded to a depression while near Socorro Island and the last advisory was issued on the weakened Ava later that day. The remains of Ava continued northwest and then took a westward move on July 10. By this point, Ava had completely dissipated.

Despite its proximity to land, no reports of damages or deaths were reported in connection to Ava.

=== Hurricane Bernice ===
- Category 1 hurricane (SSHWS)
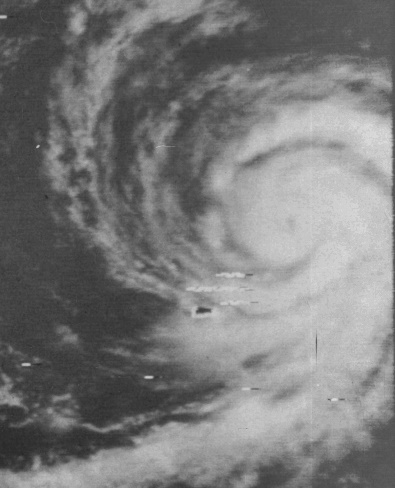
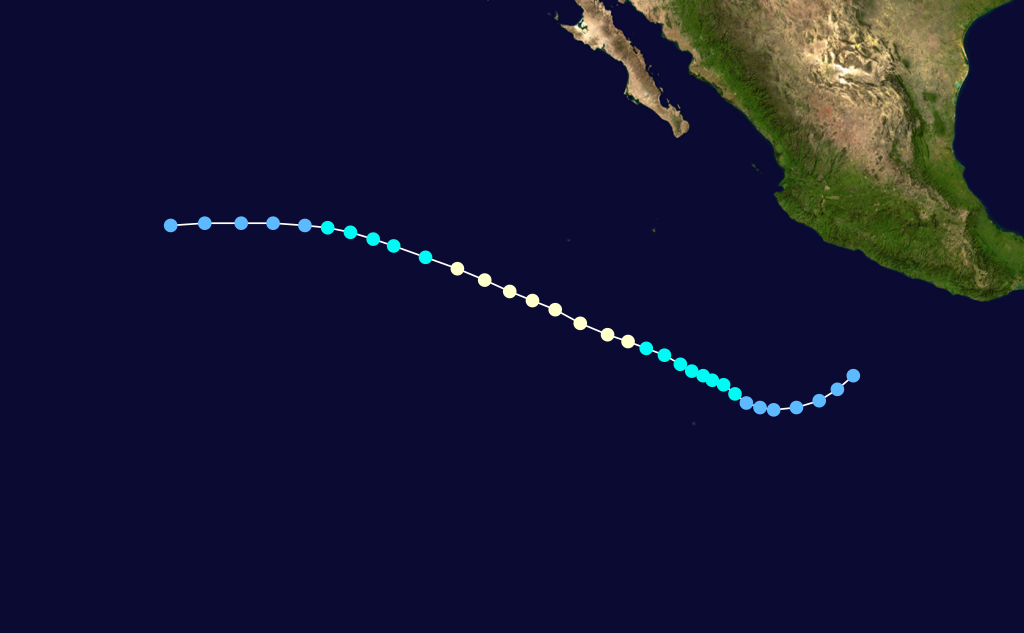
- Duration: July 9 – July 17
- Peak intensity: 85 mph (140 km/h) (1-min); ≤1004 mbar (hPa)

The system that became Hurricane Bernice was an area of disturbed weather. After signs of a circulation appeared on July 8, the system was designated a tropical depression. The depression developed and strengthened into Tropical Storm Bernice on July 10. Bernice continued a west-northwestard motion and, on July 12, achieved Category 1 strength. Bernice then accelerated in forward speed from 9 mph to 13 mph (21 km/h). Afterwards, Bernice began to weaken, with it being downgraded into a storm on July 15. Further weakening commenced, and Bernice was downgraded to a depression on July 16. The final advisory on Bernice was issued on July 17. Bernice never affected land.

Bernice can be seen in photographs taken by Apollo 11 on the 16th, and could also be seen in a TV broadcast made by the astronauts.

=== Tropical Storm Claudia ===
- Tropical storm (SSHWS)
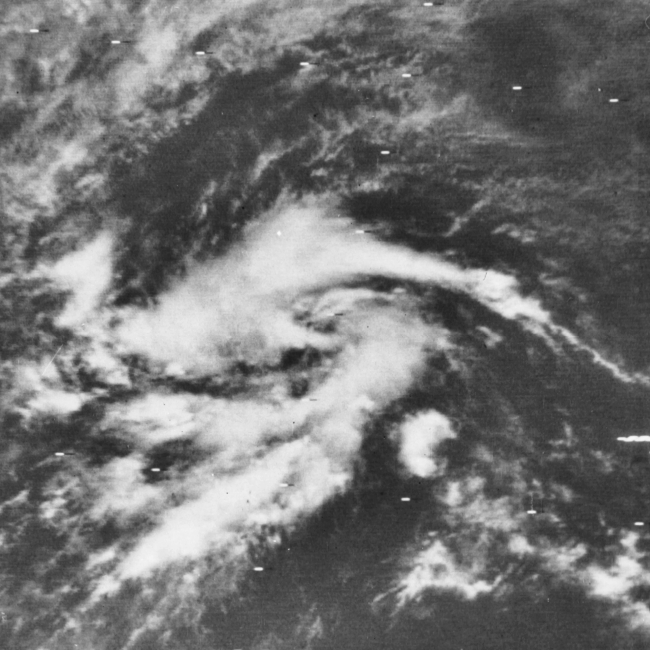
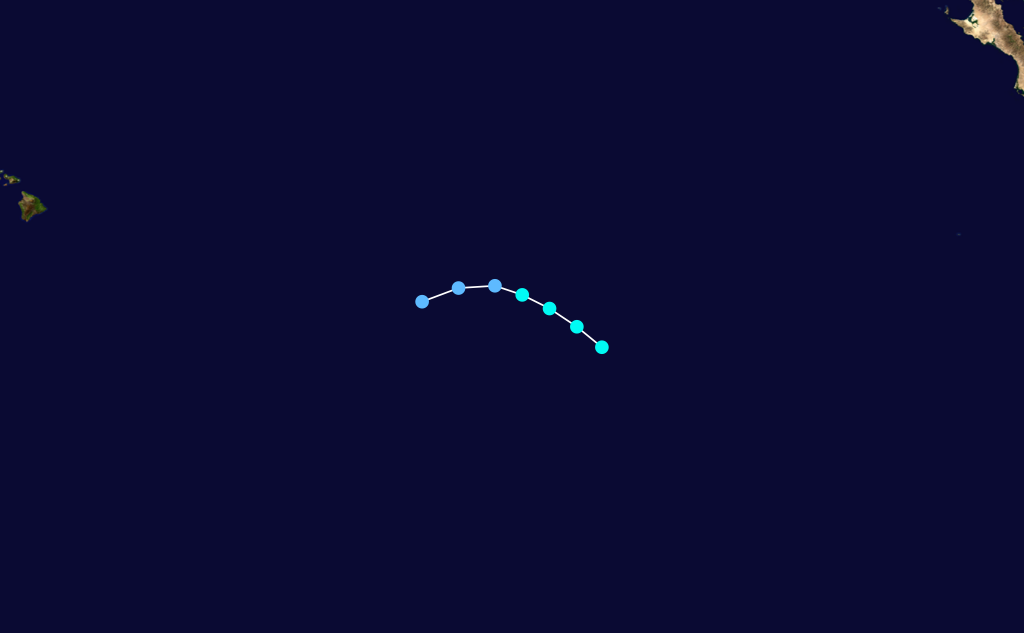
- Duration: July 22 – July 23
- Peak intensity: 50 mph (85 km/h) (1-min);

On July 21, a tropical depression advisory was issued on a loosely organized area of convection based on satellite pictures because of a lack of ships reporting in the area where it formed. The initial forecast was for an increase in strength and motion into the easterlies at a pace of 11 mph (18 km/h). On July 22, it was decided that the system had achieved enough organization to become a tropical storm and was named Claudia. Claudia's time as a tropical storm was brief; it was downgraded into a depression on July 23, only 24 hours after first becoming a storm. The storm continued to weaken, dissipating later that day.

Because of a lack of shipping near where Claudia existed, intensity forecasts were based almost entirely on satellite presentation. The only ship near the storm was a Navy vessel named Fernie. The ship reported an eastward wind of 25 mph (40 km/h) about 50 miles from the center and a pressure of 1006 mb.

=== Hurricane Doreen ===
- Category 1 hurricane (SSHWS)
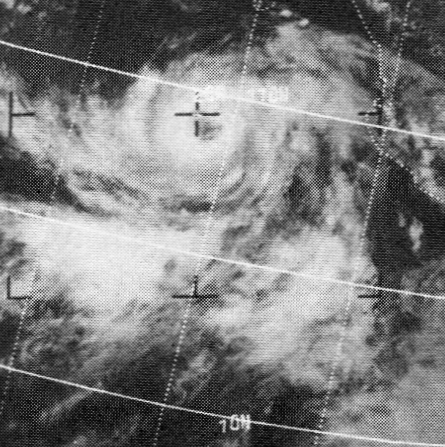
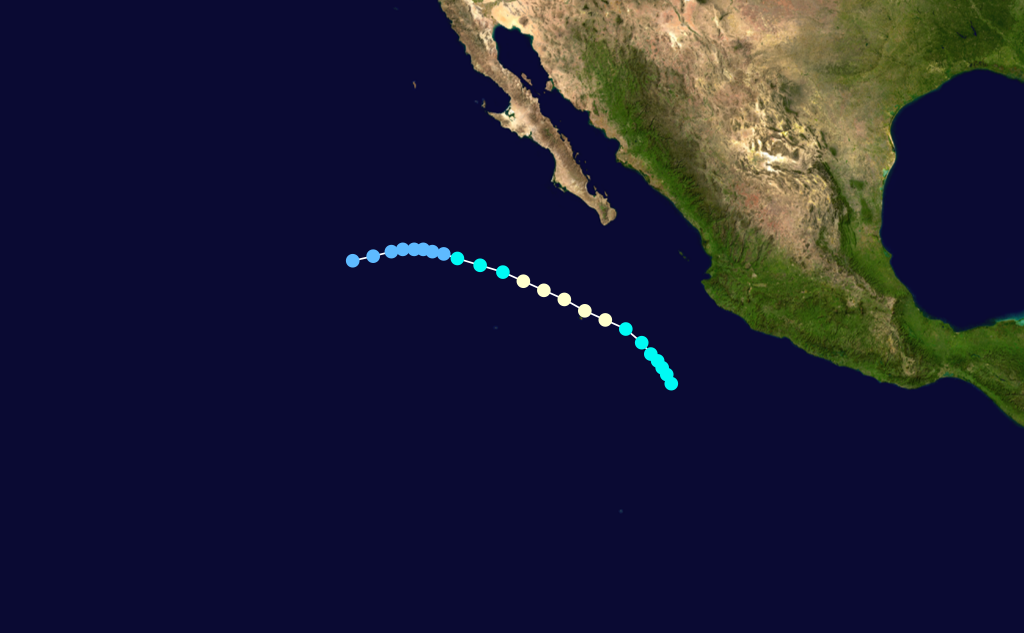
- Duration: August 4 – August 9
- Peak intensity: 85 mph (140 km/h) (1-min); ≤993 mbar (hPa)

Like Claudia before it, Doreen's formation (which started as a large cloud mass on the ITCZ) went mostly unmonitored by ship because of a lack of shipping. On August 4, a relatively unusual cirrus cloud formation resembling a pinwheel formed over the center of the storm. The formation had provided efficient evidence that the system had developed into a tropical storm, bypassing the depression stage. Doreen continued a northwest track, deepening along the way, and on August 5, a ship reported 70 mph (115 km/h) winds with a 993 mb pressure near the storm center. Based on this, Doreen was upgraded to a hurricane, the second of the season.

From here, Doreen began to take a more west-northwest path, passing by Socorro Island on August 6. On August 7, Doreen's eye broke up and, as a result, Doreen quickly weakened, being downgraded into a tropical storm shortly afterward. Continued weakening brought Doreen down to a depression on August 8, when Doreen slowed to a crawl. Doreen held on to depression strength until August 9, when it entered an area of easterlies, which did nothing to help the already-weakening Doreen, but rather dissipating it quickly. Traces of Doreen continued to show up on satellite until August 11, when no traces remained.

=== Tropical Depression Seven ===
- Tropical depression (SSHWS)
- Duration: August 5 – August 5
- Peak intensity: 35 mph (55 km/h) (1-min);

A very short lived storm, Tropical Depression Seven formed off the coast of Mexico on August 5, dissipating the same day.

=== Tropical Storm Emily ===
- Tropical storm (SSHWS)
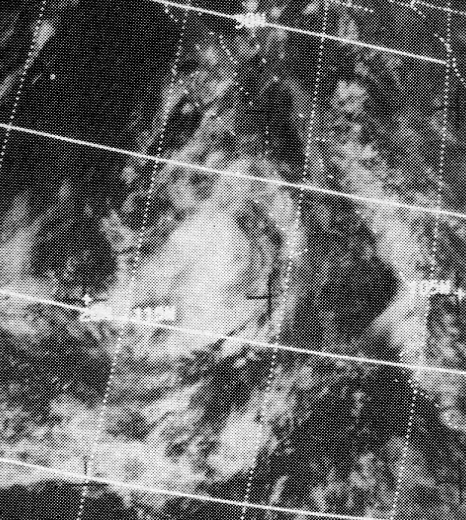
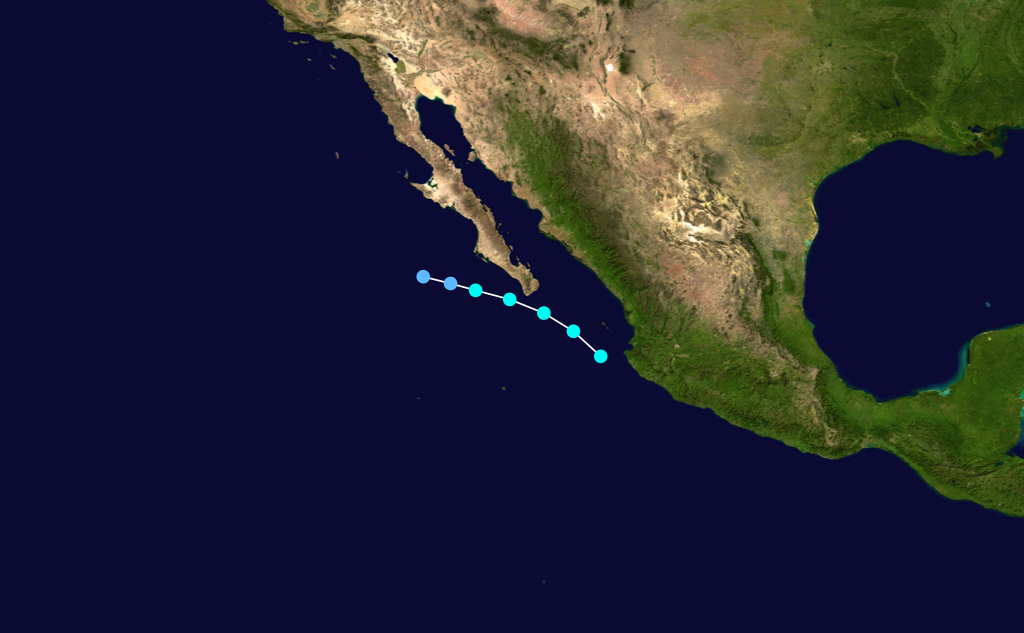
- Duration: August 22 – August 23
- Peak intensity: 65 mph (100 km/h) (1-min); ≤998 mbar (hPa)

Emily's origins can be traced back to a large low-pressure center over Mexico that persisted from August 20 to August 21. During that time, thunderstorm activity flared up over the Mexican mainland, but no evidence of a circulation was found. However, on August 21, a circulation developed at around 14° N and was apparent on weather maps, but at the time, no major winds were suspected near the center. Finally, on August 22, a ship in the area reported 45-50 mph (72–80 km/h) winds, and based on this report, the system was initiated as Tropical Storm Emily, becoming the third storm in a row to have been upgraded straight to tropical storm strength, bypassing depression stage. From this point on, early reports on Emily were plagued by delays, namely the initial formation report, which was delayed long enough to miss the first advisory. A 998 mb pressure was recorded in Emily on August 23 and Emily reached its peak intensity of 65 mph (105 km/h) later that day, with a circular eye being reported by recon. Suddenly, Emily started rapidly weakening, becoming poorly defined later that day, and by August 24, no traces of Emily remained.

While no casualties or damages were reported in connection to Emily, the low-pressure center that formed Emily was responsible for nine deaths on the mainland and rendered 100,000 homeless due to flooding.

=== Tropical Storm Florence ===
- Tropical storm (SSHWS)
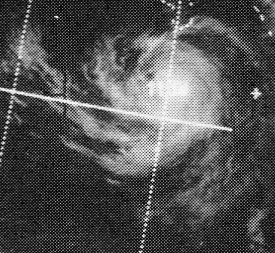
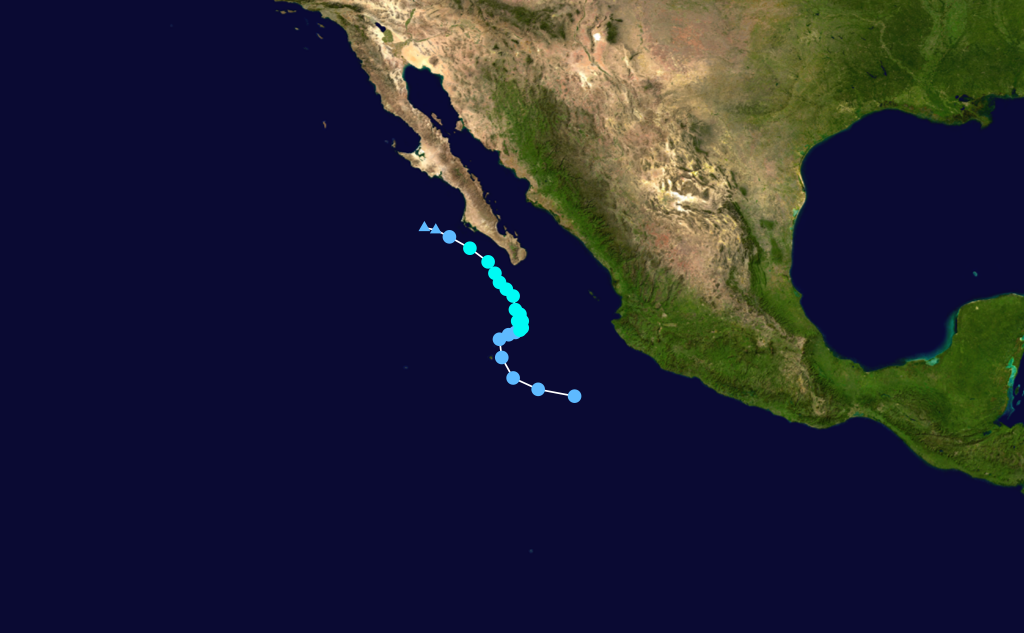
- Duration: September 2 – September 7
- Peak intensity: 70 mph (110 km/h) (1-min); ≤992 mbar (hPa)

A low-pressure area that persisted off the coast of Mexico produced squalls during late August and early September. On September 2, the system developed and became a tropical depression. The depression was deemed a storm after satellite imagery showed a cloud pattern typical of a tropical storm and the depression was upgraded after the fact.

Florence continued northward, strengthening to near-hurricane intensity with peak winds of 70 mph (115 km/h) and a pressure of 992 mb. On September 7, Florence moved into colder water, which took a fast and heavy toll on Florence, weakening it to a depression shortly afterward and, not long after the downgrade, Florence had dissipated.

=== Hurricane Glenda ===
- Category 1 hurricane (SSHWS)
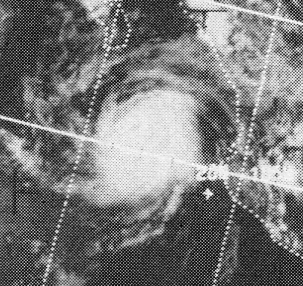
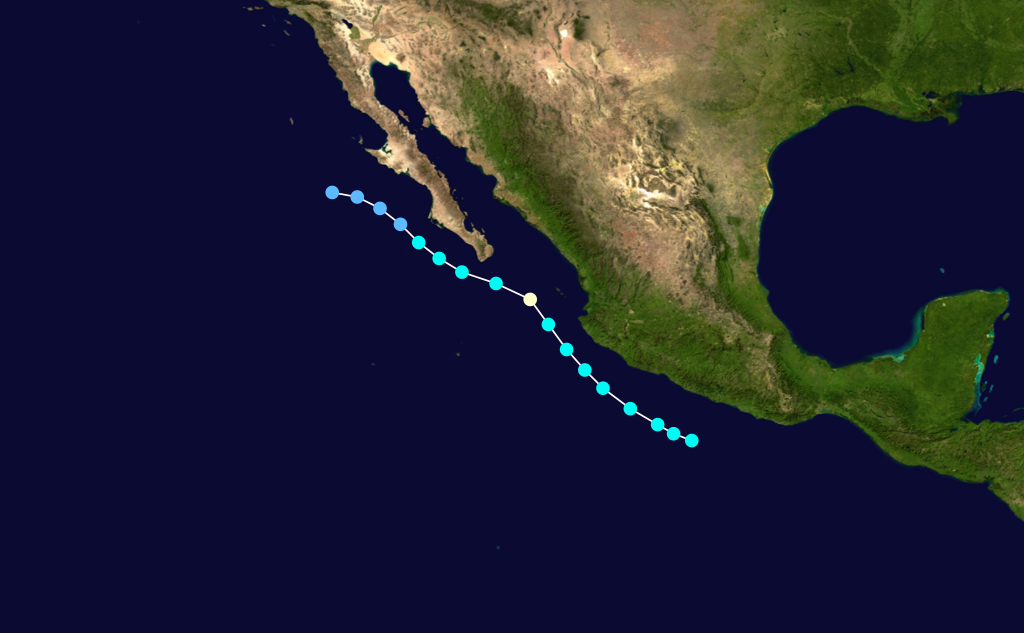
- Duration: September 8 – September 12
- Peak intensity: 75 mph (120 km/h) (1-min); ≤993 mbar (hPa)

The remains of what was formerly Hurricane Francelia crossed over Central America and contributed to an area of convection that formed 120 miles southwest of Acapulco. A separate mass of clouds existed west-northwest of the main disturbance but, unlike the former, this mass did not organize. The storm began to organize and, like nearly all other storms of this season, Glenda was named on September 7, bypassing the depression phase when a report from a ship indicated a barometric pressure of 997 mb and was falling rapidly as well as reporting heavy showers. Glenda continued its motion northwest while increasing in strength, with a closed eye being noticed on September 9. Because of the closed eye and cirrus cap, it was determined that Glenda had become a hurricane.

Glenda's time as a hurricane was very short lived as it was downgraded to a storm just six hours after the initial upgrade. The weakening trend continued while it moved northwest, towards the Baja California Peninsula, but Glenda moved westward, avoiding landfall. It dissipated on September 12.

=== Tropical Storm Heather ===
- Tropical storm (SSHWS)
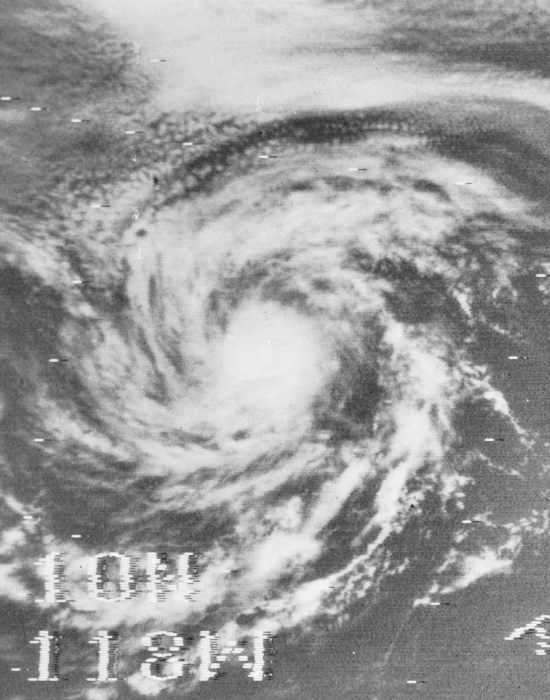
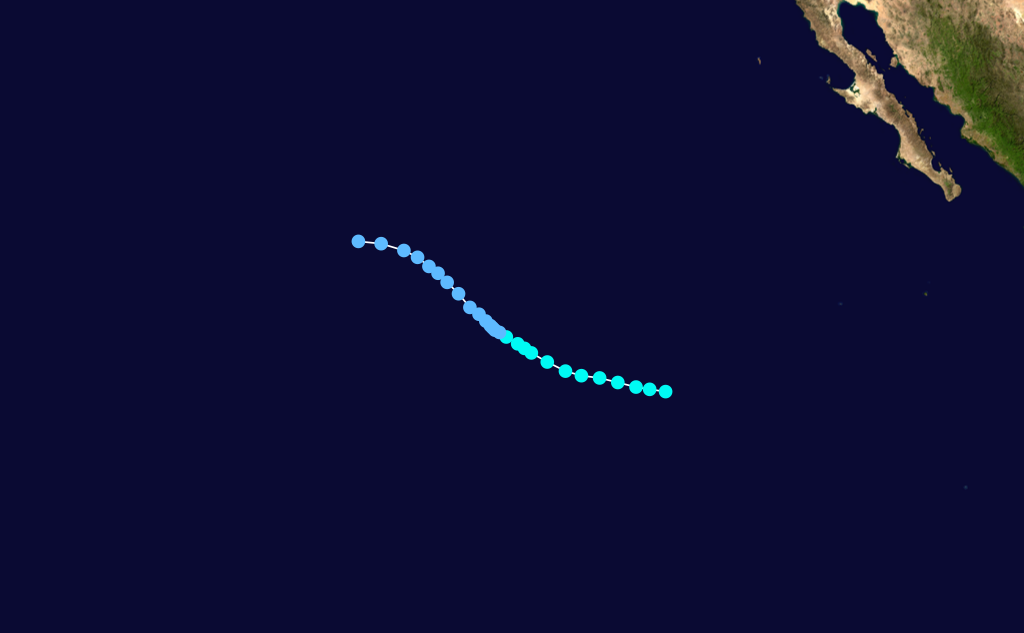
- Duration: September 19 – September 25
- Peak intensity: 65 mph (100 km/h) (1-min);

The information is unclear on how Heather developed but it was first noticed on September 18 1,000 miles southwest of La Paz, Baja California. Like Claudia and Doreen, Heather's lifespan was mostly monitored by satellite and Air Force recon because of a lack of shipping in the general area. From where it first grew, Heather moved west-northwest, reached its peak intensity of 65 mph (105 km/h) winds, and then eventually weakened to a depression on September 22 and was considered dissipated. On September 23, however, Heather regenerated. Heather would begin to accelerate, followed by a westward motion on September 25, dissipating later that day, this time for good.

Heather's peak intensity was kept at 65 mph both operationally and in post-season because of cool inflow. However, Heather's satellite presentation more resembled a hurricane, showing broad spiral arms.

=== Tropical Storm Irah ===
- Tropical storm (SSHWS)
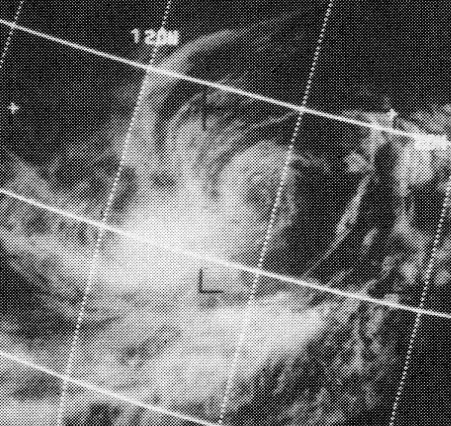
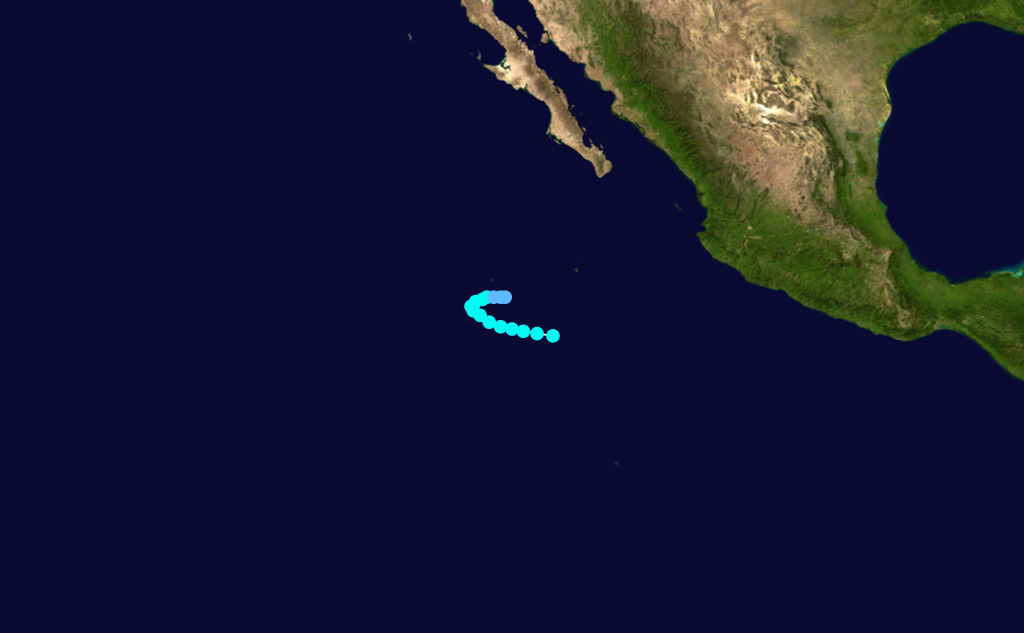
- Duration: September 30 – October 3
- Peak intensity: 50 mph (85 km/h) (1-min); ≤1003 mbar (hPa)

Radio interference and low angle plagued research into a possible circulation that had developed in an area of the ITCZ during September 28 and September 29. Finally, on September 30, a depression was thought to have developed. However, a bulletin from a different source provided with a mosaic image was the evidence used in giving the system the name Irah and treating it as a tropical storm. Irah moved west-northwest until October 1, when it curved northward. By this point, Irah had started weakening, dropping into a depression on October 3. Shortly afterward, Irah had degenerated into an area of squalls.

=== Tropical Depression Thirteen ===
- Tropical depression (SSHWS)
- Duration: October 3 – October 4
- Peak intensity: 35 mph (55 km/h) (1-min); 999 mbar (hPa)

Tropical Depression Thirteen formed off the coast of Mexico on October 3. Moving north-northwest, the depression made landfall late on October 4, dissipating soon thereafter. No deaths or damages were reported in connection to the depression.

=== Tropical Depression Fourteen ===
- Tropical depression (SSHWS)
- Duration: October 4 – October 5
- Peak intensity: 35 mph (55 km/h) (1-min);

Tropical Depression Fourteen formed on October 4 and dissipated the day after.

=== Hurricane Jennifer ===
- Category 1 hurricane (SSHWS)
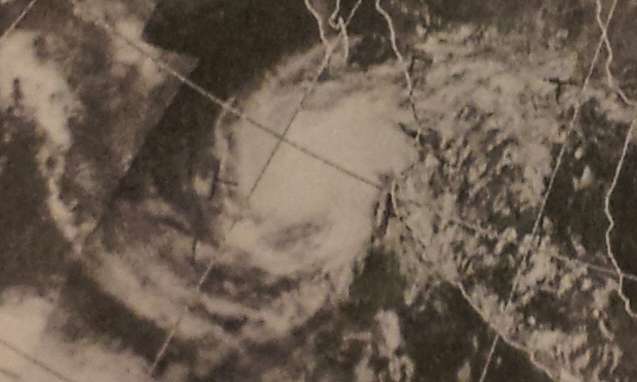
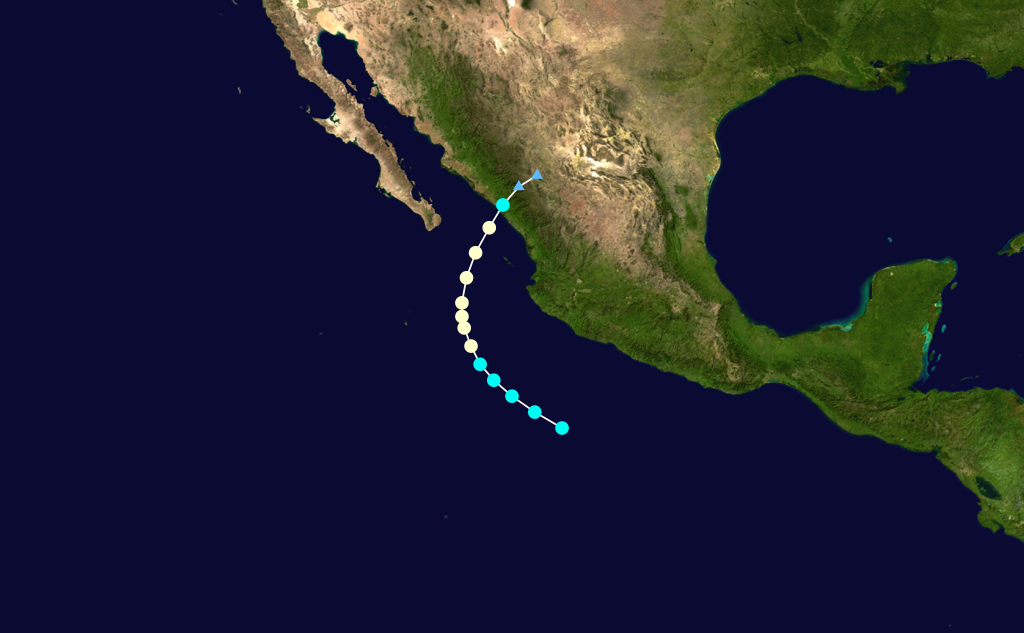
- Duration: October 9 – October 12
- Peak intensity: 75 mph (120 km/h) (1-min); ≤991 mbar (hPa)

The final storm of the season, Jennifer, had a similar origin to Irah when it originated from an area of disturbed weather on the ITCZ. The system proceeded to develop and became a tropical disturbance, but no reports showed that the system was a tropical cyclone, although they reported 30 mph (50 km/h) winds and showers. On October 8, a German ship in the area relayed a message to the bureau mentioning an area with a 995 mb pressure (the ship had previously recorded 1003 mb before it sharply fell to the 995 reported). Later, another ship reported 45 mph (70 km/h) winds in the vicinity, prompting the advisories that Tropical Storm Jennifer had formed. Jennifer moved to the northwest, obtaining hurricane strength on October 9. At this time, Jennifer was 200 miles off shore, moving northwest at 7 mph (11 km/h), paralleling the coast. Then Jennifer turned to the northeast while accelerating, ending up about 60 miles west of Mazatlán. Around this time, a dropsonde malfunction ceased any penetration into the storm, but the plane estimated the winds of the storm to be 55 mph (90 km/h) winds. On late October 11, Jennifer moved onshore and dissipated on October 12.

Jennifer was reported to have killed one person and injured 15, all in Mazatlán. Jennifer also caused a ferry and twelves boats used for fishing shrimp to be washed up in the Mazatlán Harbor. Over 30 other shrimp boats were reported missing, but were moored in unknown areas. Damage was reportedly extensive, but no monetary figures exist.

== Storm names ==
The following list of names was used for named storms that formed in the Eastern Pacific east of 140°W in 1969. This is the same list as list 2 used during 1960–1965, except for Heather, which replaced Hazel. A storm was named Heather for the first time in 1969. No names were retired from this list following the season, so it was used again for the 1973 season.

- Ava
- Bernice
- Claudia
- Doreen
- Emily
- Florence
- Glenda
- Heather
- Irah
- Jennifer
- Katherine (unused)
- Lillian (unused)
- Mona (unused)
- Natalie (unused)
- Odessa (unused)
- Prudence (unused)
- Roslyn (unused)
- Silvia (unused)
- Tillie (unused)
- Victoria (unused)
- Wallie (unused)

Had any named storms formed in the Central Pacific between 140°W and the International Date Line in 1969, their names would have been drawn from the Western Pacific typhoon naming list.

== See also ==
- 1969 Atlantic hurricane season
- 1969 Pacific typhoon season
- 1969 North Indian Ocean cyclone season
- Australian region cyclone seasons: 1968–69 1969–70
- South Pacific cyclone seasons: 1968–69 1969–70
- South-West Indian Ocean cyclone seasons: 1968–69 1969–70
