= 1970 North Indian Ocean cyclone season =

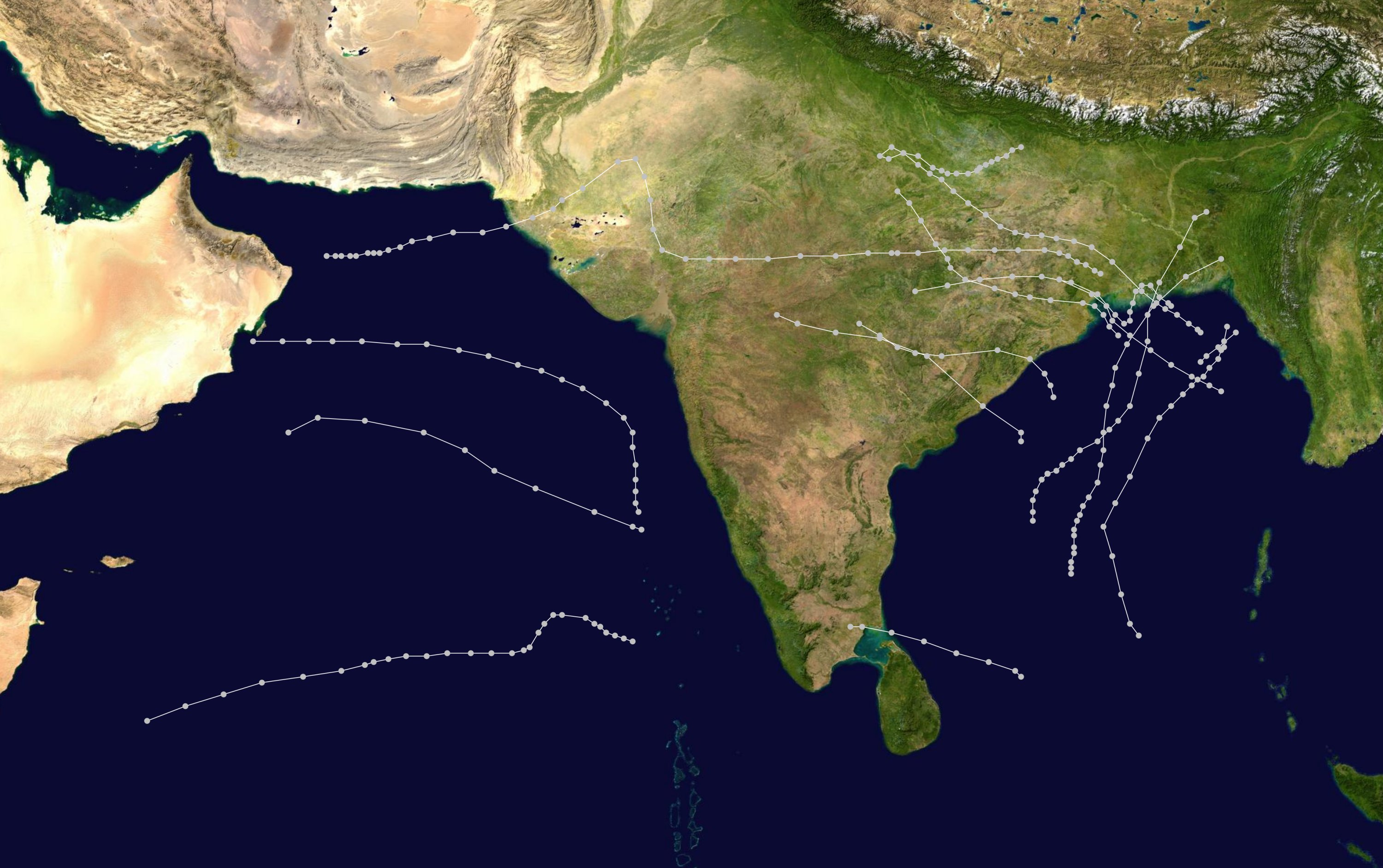
- Season summary map

Seasonal boundaries
- First system formed: May 2, 1970
- Last system dissipated: November 29, 1970

Strongest storm
- Name: Thirteen
  - Maximum winds: 185 km/h (115 mph)
  - Lowest pressure: 960 hPa (mbar)

Seasonal statistics
- Depressions: 15
- Deep depressions: 11
- Cyclonic storms: 7
- Severe cyclonic storms: 3
- Total fatalities: 300,805-500,805 (Deadliest tropical cyclone season on record)
- Total damage: $86.4 million (1970 USD)

Related articles
- 1970 Atlantic hurricane season; 1970 Pacific hurricane season; 1970 Pacific typhoon season

The 1970 North Indian Ocean cyclone season was an extremely devastating North Indian cyclone season. It saw a total of seven cyclonic storms, of which three developed into severe cyclonic storms. The Bay of Bengal was more active than the Arabian Sea during 1970, with all of the three severe cyclonic storms in the season forming there. Unusually, none of the storms in the Arabian Sea made landfall this year. The most significant storm of the season was the Bhola cyclone, which formed in the Bay of Bengal and hit Bangladesh on November 12. The storm killed between 300,000 and 500,000, making it the deadliest tropical cyclone in recorded history. The season was also the deadliest tropical cyclone season globally, with 500,805 fatalities, mostly due to the aforementioned Bhola cyclone.

== Systems ==
=== Severe Cyclonic Storm One ===
- Very severe cyclonic storm (IMD)
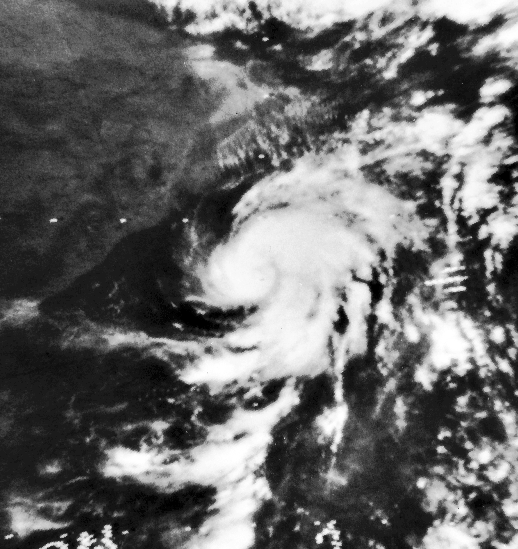
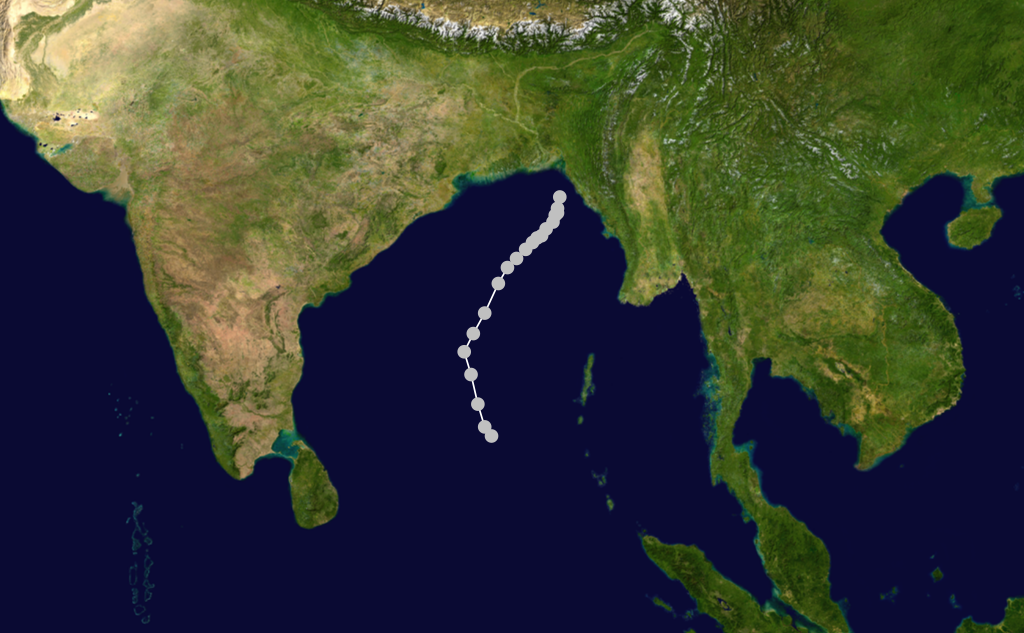
- Duration: May 2 – May 7
- Peak intensity: 150 km/h (90 mph) (3-min); 975 hPa (mbar)

A low-pressure area that developed over the southern Andaman Sea late in April moved north into the Bay of Bengal, becoming the first depression of the year on May 2. The depression intensified under the influence of a high-level anticyclone and became a cyclonic storm the next day. The storm then turned to the northeast and strengthened into a severe cyclonic storm on May 4. Soon after this, it peaked with winds of 150 km/h (95 mph) and a well-defined eye formed. The storm made its landfall near Cox's Bazar in easternmost East Pakistan (now Bangladesh) early in the morning of May 7 and dissipated over western Burma that evening.

The cyclone brought widespread rain to the Andaman and Nicobar Islands, before it moved clear of them on May 3. Effects in East Pakistan are unknown, but Akyab in western Burma reported winds of 55 km/h (35 mph) as the cyclone approached land.

=== Depression Two ===
- Depression (IMD)
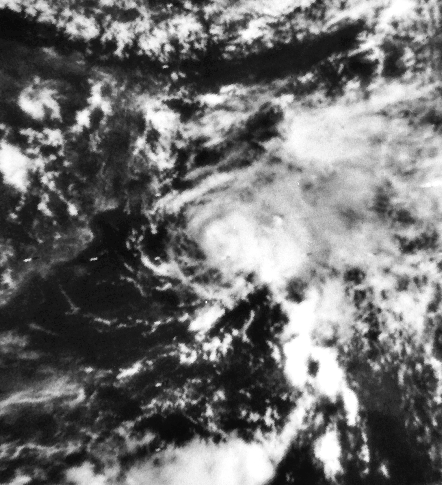
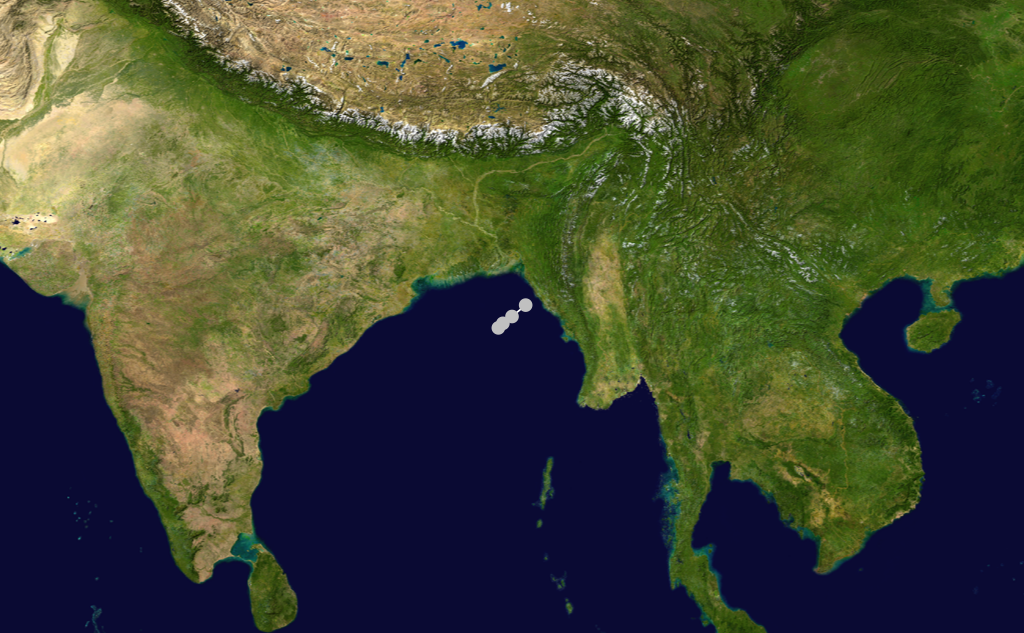
- Duration: May 23 – May 24
- Peak intensity: 45 km/h (30 mph) (3-min);

A depression formed in the northeast of the Bay of Bengal during the morning of May 23, near the East Pakistan coast. It moved towards the coast and made landfall to the south of Cox's Bazar that night, before dissipating over southern Assam on the next day. Any effects on land are unknown.

=== Cyclonic Storm Three ===
- Severe cyclonic storm (IMD)
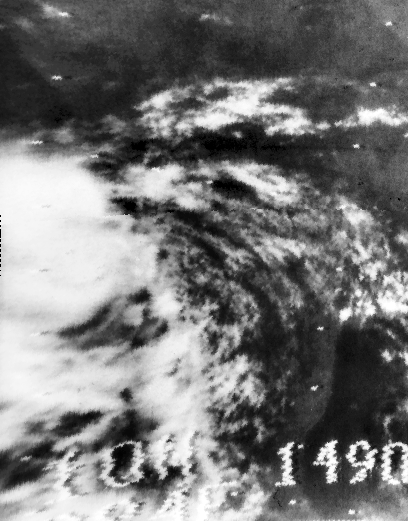
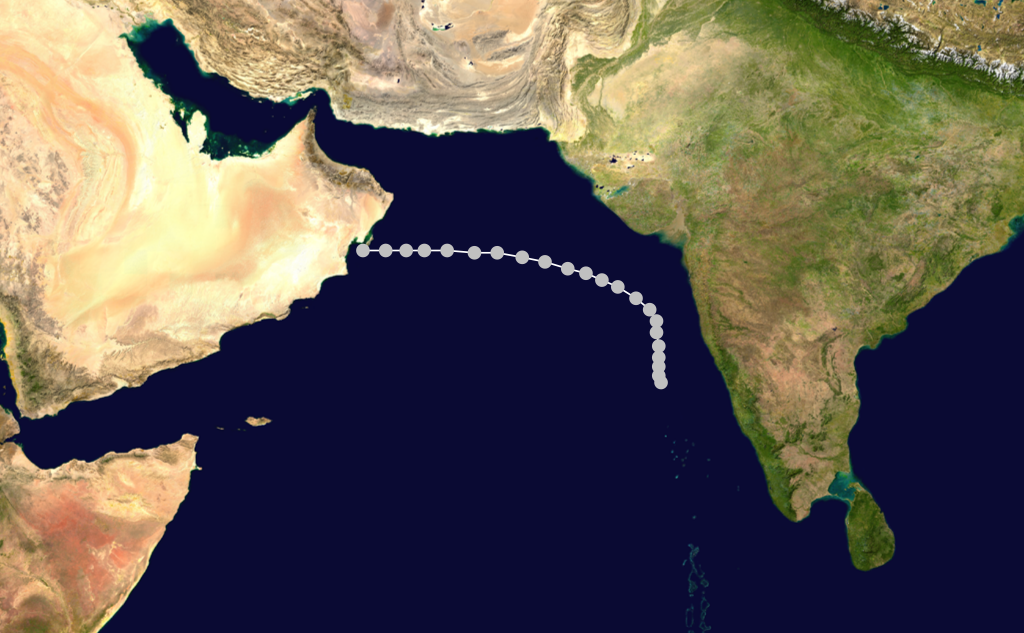
- Duration: May 28 – June 2
- Peak intensity: 95 km/h (60 mph) (3-min); 986 hPa (mbar)

A low-pressure area developed off the Karnataka–Goa coastline in the Arabian Sea on May 27, and developed into a depression on the next day. The system developed further into a cyclonic storm on May 29 as it moved to the north. The storm reached its peak with 95 km/h (60 mph); soon after this, as it turned to the west, but soon degenerated into a deep depression over the northern Arabian Sea on May 31. The depression continued to move westward, weakening to a remnant low shortly afterward, as it made landfall on the Arabian Peninsula, on June 2. The remnant low dissipated over southern Saudi Arabia on the next day. The cyclone itself had minimal effects on land, but the monsoon advanced into western India in late May in association with the system. As the cyclone moved to the west away from the subcontinent, the incursion of moist air from the Arabian Sea persisted over northwestern India for the first three days of June. This brought moderate rainfall to regions of Gujarat, Rajasthan and western Madhya Pradesh.

=== Cyclonic Storm Four ===
- Cyclonic storm (IMD)
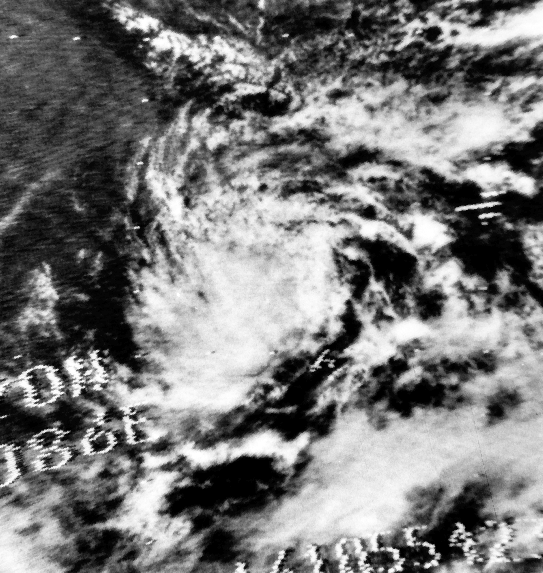
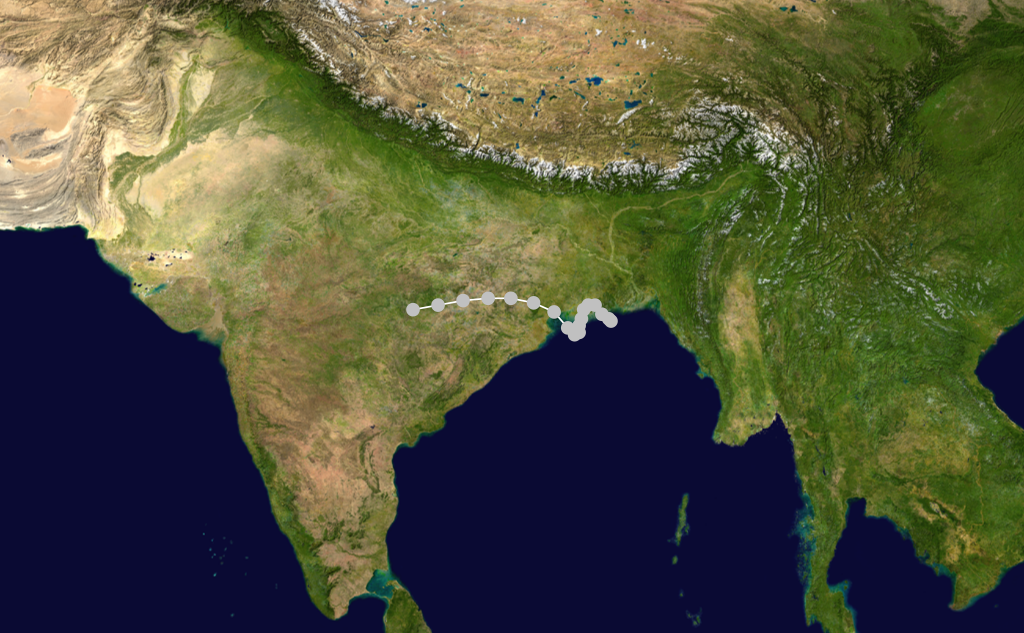
- Duration: June 7 – June 11
- Peak intensity: ≥65 km/h (40 mph) (3-min); 986 hPa (mbar)

A low-pressure area developed in the northern Bay of Bengal on June 6 and developed into a depression on the next day, as it drifted to the north, moving over the south of the Ganges Delta. The depression reversed its course overland, reemerging into the Bay of Bengal on June 8. Once over open water, the depression intensified into a cyclonic storm on the morning of June 9. The cyclone's motion shifted to the northwest and it made a second landfall near Balasore in northern Orissa that night. The cyclone quickly weakened to a deep depression overland and tracked to the west over central India, where it degenerated into a broad area of low pressure on June 11. Sustained winds of 65 km/h (40 mph) were recorded at Sandheads on June 9, while the cyclone was at its peak offshore. High levels of rain affected much of Orissa and West Bengal, with over 100 mm (3.9 in) falling over large areas of both states. As the storm dissipated overland, it brought severe rain to Vidarbha and southern Madhya Pradesh. The highest recorded rainfall was at Khandwa were 280 mm (11 in) fell on June 13 alone. The rains led to localised flooding in parts of Vidarbha and disrupted road transport in the region.

=== Deep Depression Five ===
- Deep depression (IMD)
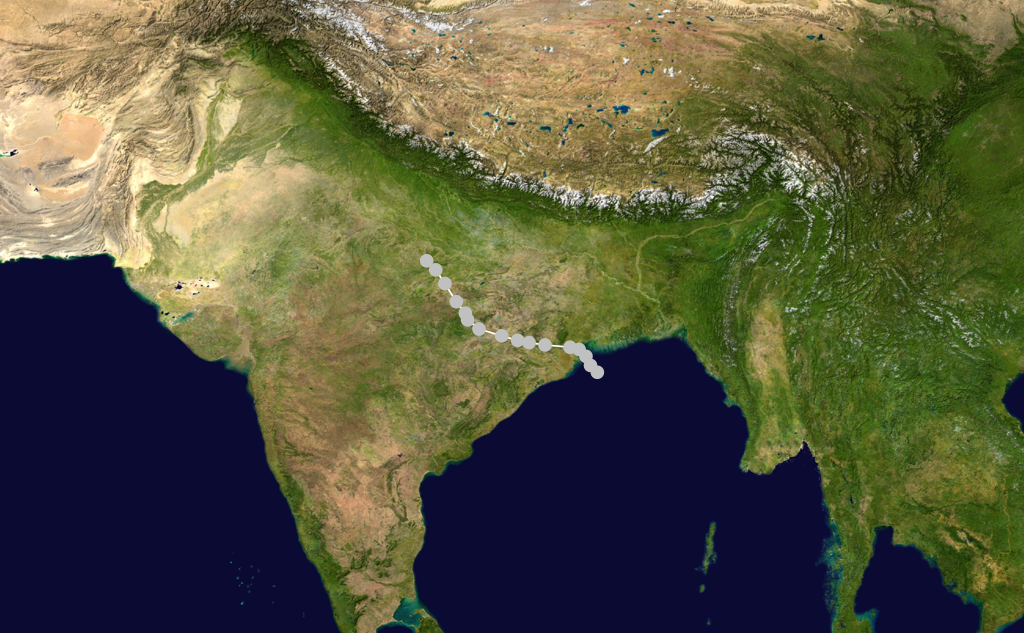
- Duration: June 29 – July 3
- Peak intensity: ≥50 km/h (30 mph) (3-min);

A low-pressure area that had developed over the northern Bay of Bengal on June 28 organized into a depression early on June 29. The depression intensified as it moved to the northwest, becoming a deep depression shortly before it crossed the Orissa coast. After landfall, the storm continued to move to the northwest, weakening to a depression again on July 2, over northeast Madhya Pradesh. It degenerated into a remnant low over central Uttar Pradesh during the evening of July 3. The depression brought intense monsoon conditions to Orissa, Madhya Pradesh and Vidarbha during its life. Over 210 mm (8.3 in) of rain and winds of 85 km/h (55 mph) were recorded in Paradip as the depression made landfall on June 30. Inland, the heavy rains caused some rivers in Orissa to overflow and flooded rice paddies in Cuttack District. Further west, the Wainganga River overflowed its banks in places. Road transport in Madhya Pradesh was disrupted and there was damage to crops in the Raipur area. Raipur recorded the highest 24-hour rains associated with the depression, with 230 mm (9.1 in) falling there on July 2.

=== Deep Depression Six ===
- Deep depression (IMD)
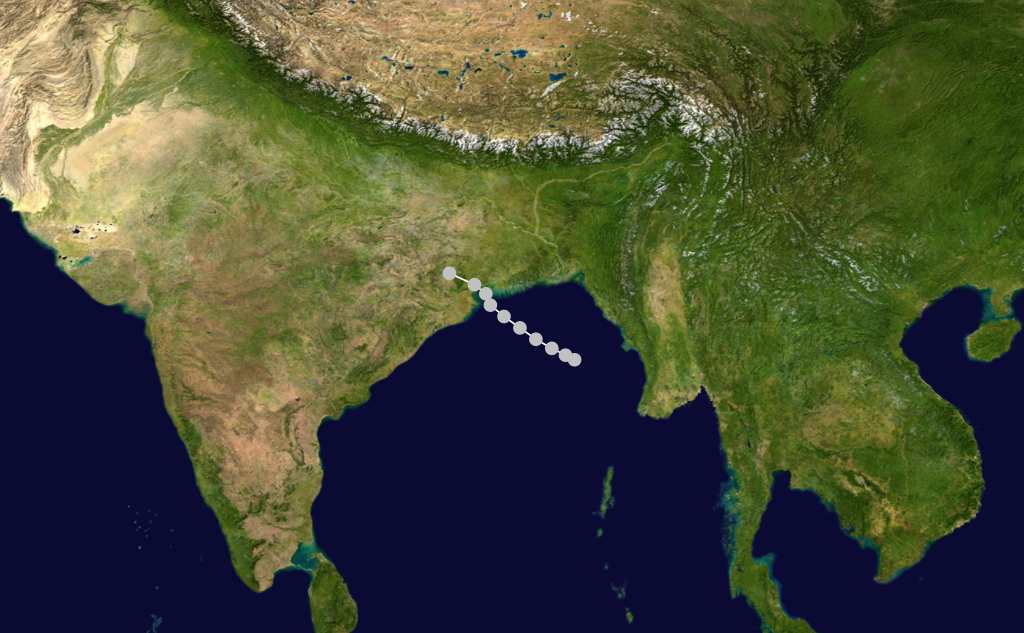
- Duration: July 6 – July 8
- Peak intensity: 55 km/h (35 mph) (3-min); ≤992 hPa (mbar)

A low-pressure area moved to the west, off the Burmese coast on July 5, and developed into a depression on the next day, in the north-central Bay of Bengal. The depression intensified as it moved to the northwest, becoming a deep depression on July 7. The system made landfall on the Orissa coast during the morning of July 8, and rapidly degenerated into a broad area of low pressure overland. The remnant low moved north over western Bihar and it persisted there until July 12, when it was absorbed by the monsoon trough. Winds of 55 km/h (35 mph) were recorded offshore at Sandheads when the system was at its peak. The depression brought isolated heavy rains to many places throughout East India, with rains in excess of 100 mm (3.9 in) falling each day from the depression's landfall until the absorption of the storm's remnant low.

=== Depression Seven ===
- Depression (IMD)
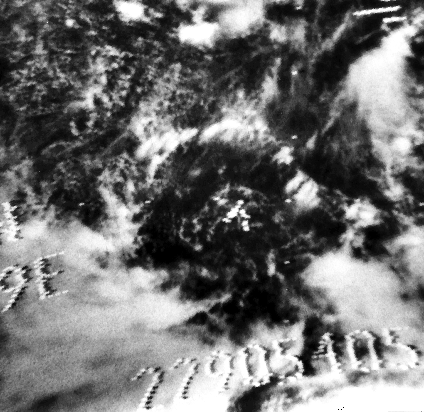
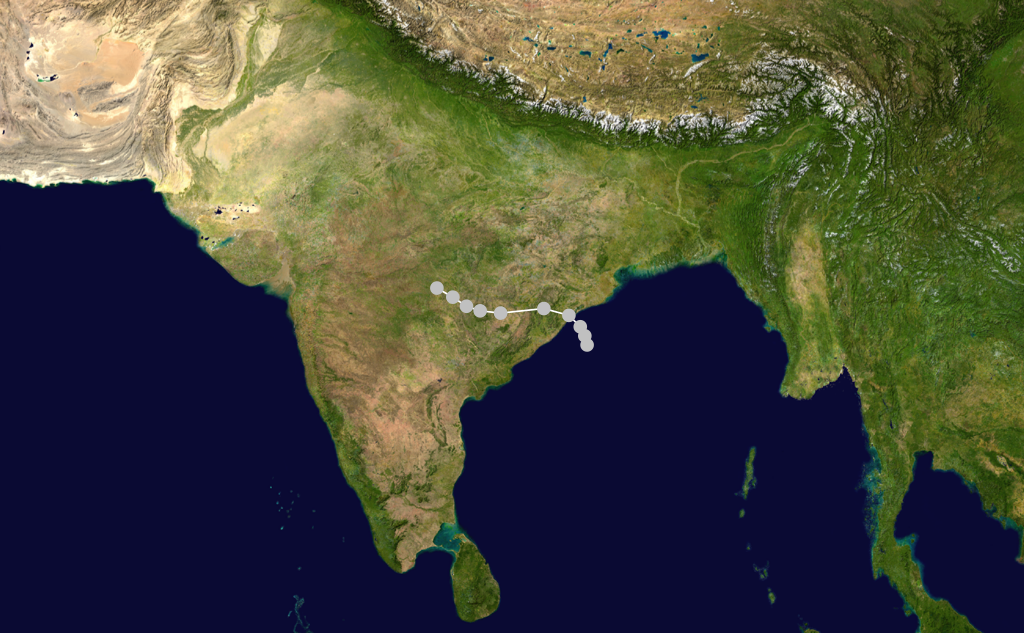
- Duration: August 17 – August 19
- Peak intensity: 45 km/h (30 mph) (3-min);

A low-pressure area that lay over Burma on August 15, moved to the west across the Bay of Bengal and developed into a depression on the evening of August 17, when it was 100 km (62 mi) southeast of Gopalpur-on-Sea. The depression moved to the northwest and made landfall near Gopalpur-on-Sea, and turned to the west overland. The depression had weakened into a remnant low by August 20, when it was over western Madhya Pradesh. The depression and associated weather brought widespread rain to much of south and central India, with heavy rain falling in some locations. The heavy rain in Maharashtra disrupted road transport in many areas, especially in the east of the state. The Godavari River inundated parts of Bhadrachalam and many villages in regions of Andhra Pradesh. The rains also damaged rice paddies and disrupted transport in Telangana. Rains associated with the depression reached as far west as Bombay with 200 mm (7.9 in) falling there on August 19.

=== Cyclonic Storm Eight ===
- Cyclonic storm (IMD)
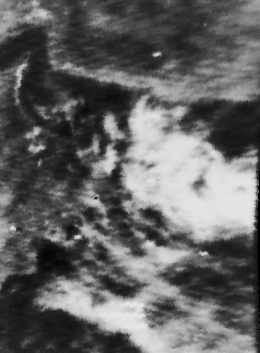
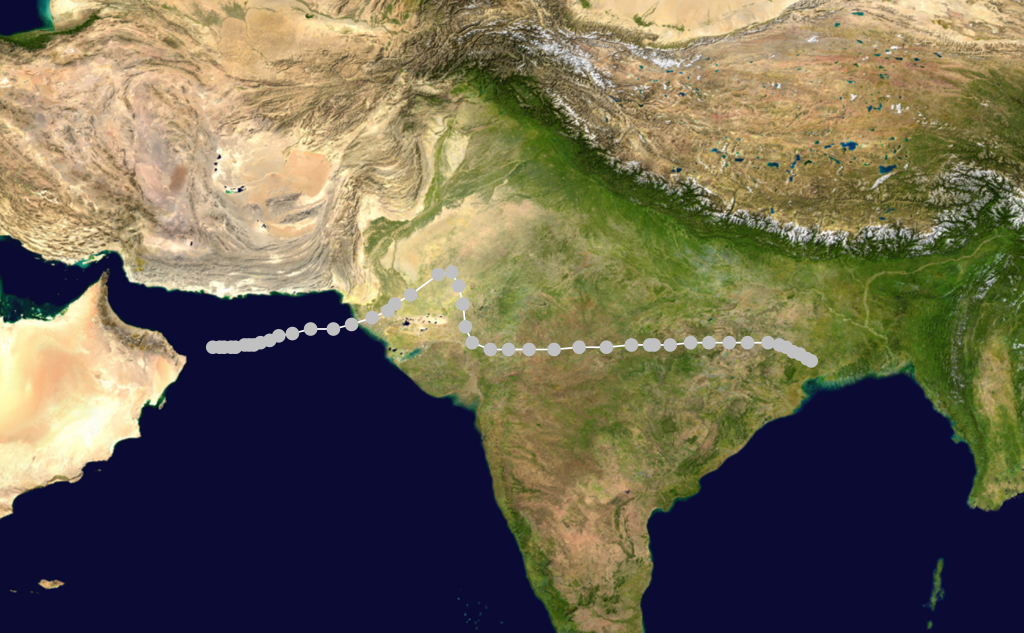
- Duration: September 2 – September 13
- Peak intensity: 65 km/h (40 mph) (3-min);

A low-pressure area that was centred over West Bengal on August 31 organized into a depression on September 2, when it was 50 km (31 mi) to the east of Midnapore. It intensified as it moved to the west, becoming a deep depression on the next day, about 50 km (31 mi) east of Ranchi. The system continued to move west across India, before weakening into a depression on September 7, near Ahmedabad, Gujarat. The depression then turned northward and entered southwest Rajasthan. On September 8, the system turned to the southwest and emerged into the Arabian Sea on the following evening. Over open water, it intensified again, becoming a cyclonic storm by the evening of September 10. The cyclone developed a short-lived eye on September 11, as it drifted slowly to the west, before degenerating into a broad area of low pressure as it neared the Oman coast, on September 14. This system brought widespread rains to a wide swathe of India during its existence. Some heavy rains in West Bengal flooded vast areas of many districts and resulted in some fatalities, whilst in parts of neighbouring Orissa the floodwaters damaged fields. 390 mm (15 in) of rain fell on Bardhaman over two days as the depression passed overhead. Several thousand people were made homeless in West Bengal. Both the Narmada and Tapti Rivers inundated parts of Madhya Pradesh and Gujarat. The floods in Gujarat took many lives and caused severe damage to crops and other properties. Between 300 and 400 people were washed away in two villages in Bharuch district. 260 mm (10 in) of rain fell on Surat on July 7 and a further 80 mm (3.1 in) on Kutch District as the cyclone moved out to sea.

=== Deep Depression Nine ===
- Deep depression (IMD)
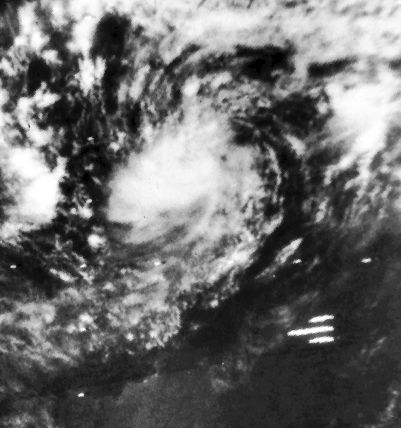
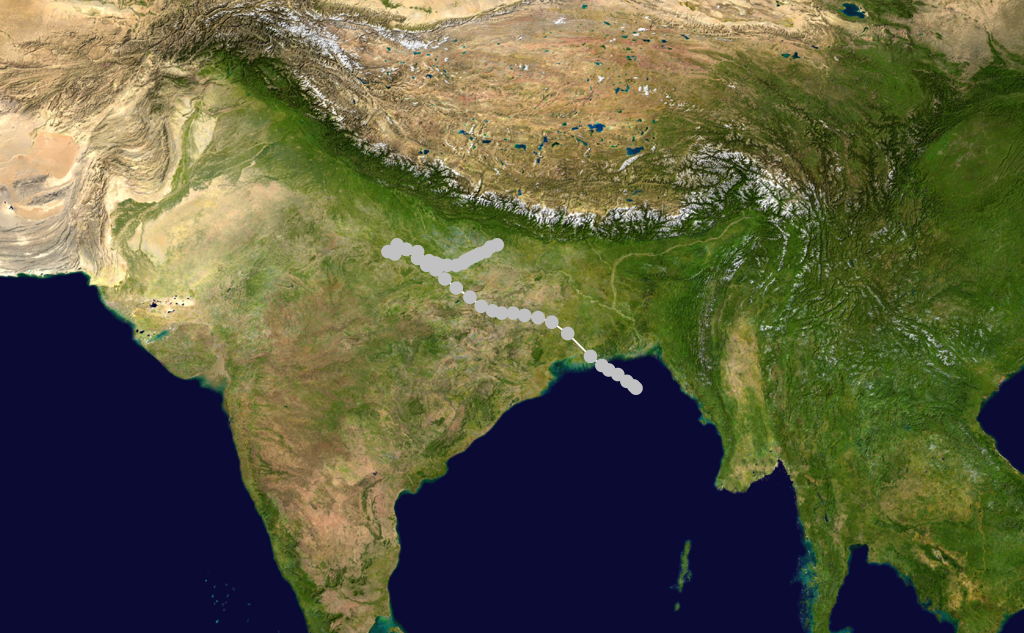
- Duration: September 8 – September 18
- Peak intensity: 55 km/h (35 mph) (3-min); 990 hPa (mbar)

A low-pressure area moved from Burma to the Bay of Bengal on September 8, where it developed into a depression. The depression strengthened as it moved to the northwest and became a deep depression on the next day, when it was 150 km (93 mi) southeast of Calcutta. The system crossed the West Bengal coast later and moved to the northwest across the Chota Nagpur Plateau. The depression stalled over Uttar Pradesh on September 12, and remained near Lucknow until September 14. The depression then turned to the east and weakened into a remnant low over northern Bihar, on September 18. The depression brought widespread rain to West Bengal, Orissa, Bihar, Uttar Pradesh, and Madhya Pradesh during its lifespan, with rains of 140 mm (5.5 in) as far west as Lucknow. The rains in Uttar Pradesh caused severe property damage and flooding, with some 150 people losing their lives in the state. The Ganges flooded in northern Bihar, inundating parts of Munger District, whilst the Gandaki River flooded parts of Motihari. The rains worsened floods in south Bengal, increasing the death toll from the floods there to 80 and affecting 8 million people, with considerable damage done to crops and housing. Jaleswar in Orissa was entirely flooded.

=== Depression Ten ===
- Depression (IMD)
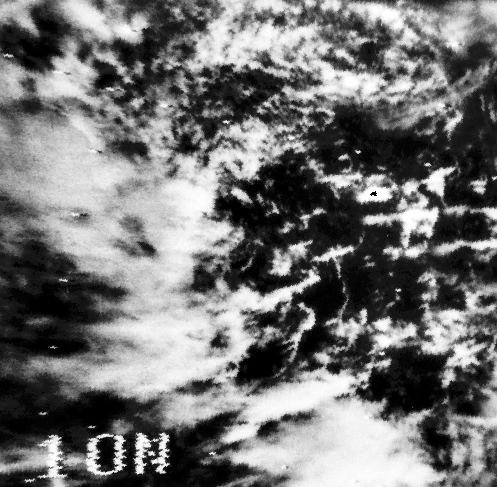
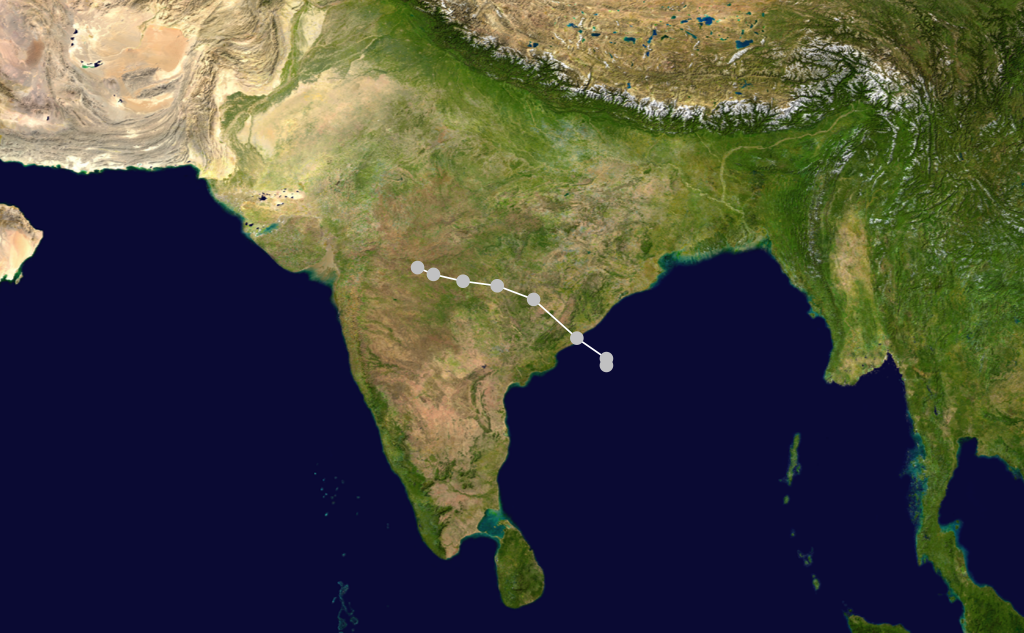
- Duration: September 21 – September 23
- Peak intensity: 45 km/h (30 mph) (3-min);

A well-defined low-pressure area formed over the west central Bay of Bengal on September 20, and developed into a depression on the next morning about 100 km (62 mi) south-east of Visakhapatnam. The depression then moved overland, and after crossing Vidarbha, weakened into a remnant low over Gujarat on September 23. The depression brought widespread rain to northern South India as it passed over the country, and its remnants brought scattered rain to Gujarat over the following week. Over a period of four hours, heavy rain fell on Hyderabad and Secunderabad, destroying many houses in the two cities. About 130 mm (5.1 in) of rain fell on Bombay as the system dissipated. The heavy rains claimed about 75 lives.

=== Depression Eleven ===
- Depression (IMD)
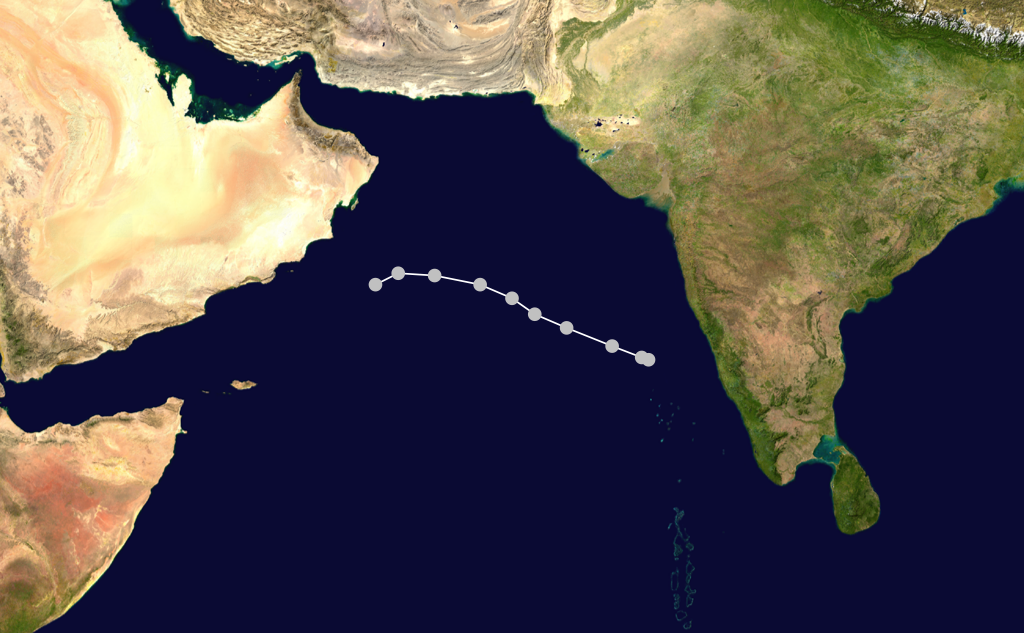
- Duration: October 11 – October 13
- Peak intensity: 45 km/h (30 mph) (3-min);

A low-pressure area that developed in the Bay of Bengal passed over the southern Indian subcontinent and developed into a depression in the Arabian Sea, off the southern Maharashtra coast on October 11. The depression did not develop further as it drifted westward, and it degenerated into an area of low pressure on October 13, as it was approaching the Arabian Peninsula. The depression brought widespread rains to southern Maharashtra and Karnataka states, with 40 millimetres (1.6 in) of rain recorded in Karwar. Scattered heavy rain was also reported in the Laccadives.

=== Severe Cyclonic Storm Twelve ===
- Very severe cyclonic storm (IMD)
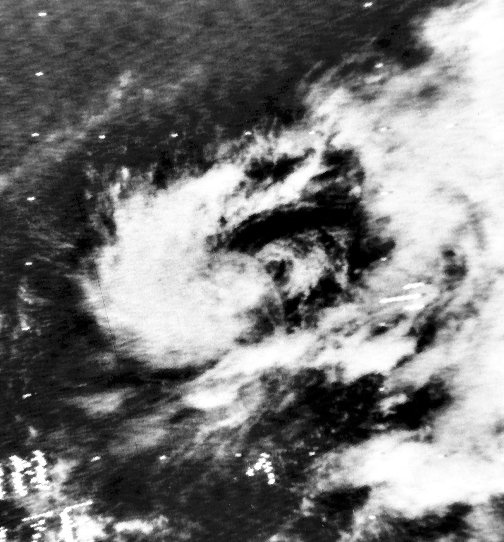
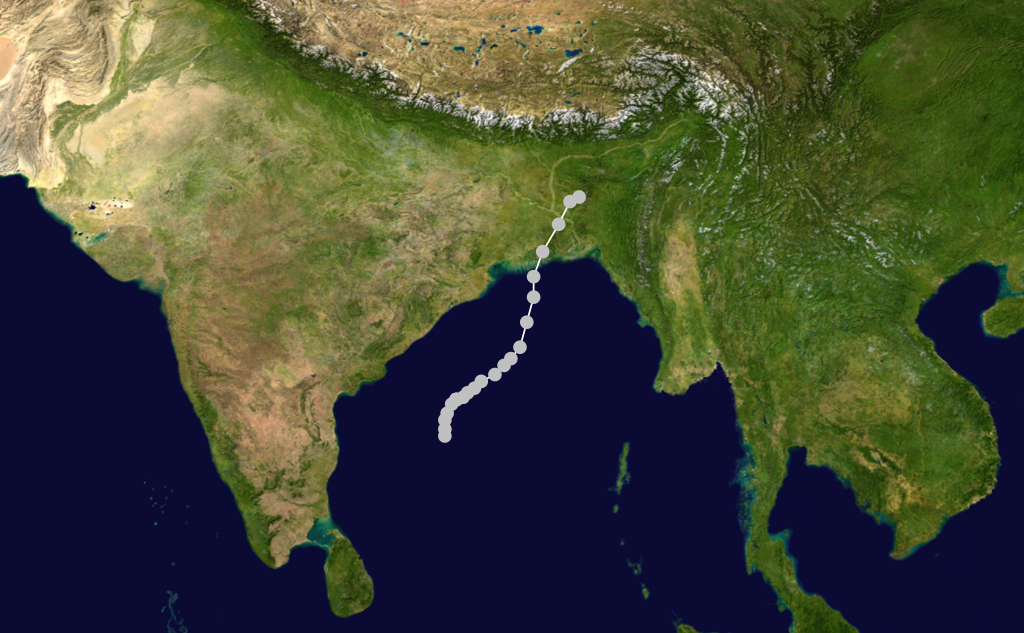
- Duration: October 18 – October 24
- Peak intensity: 130 km/h (80 mph) (3-min); 980 hPa (mbar)

A depression formed on October 18 in the central Bay of Bengal, and moved to the north. It gradually intensified and turned to the northeast, becoming a cyclonic storm on October 20. The storm became the second severe cyclonic storm of the season on the following day, and turned onto a more northerly track towards the Ganges Delta. The storm peaked with winds of 130 km/h (80 mph) before it made landfall near the West Bengal–East Pakistan border, during the morning of October 23. The storm then crossed over East Pakistan, before dissipating over southern Assam on October 24.

This cyclone brought widespread rain to Tamil Nadu as it formed, and to the Andaman and Nicobar Islands as it moved over the Bay of Bengal. After its landfall, it brought severe rains to West Bengal, Assam, and East Pakistan. The highest recorded rainfall in India was at Shillong, where 220 mm (8.7 in) fell on October 24. A gust of 105 km/h (65 mph) was recorded in Calcutta as the storm passed by to the east, where it caused the failure of the power supply.

The cyclone claimed between 200 and 300 lives in East Pakistan, with the worst of the damage occurring in Khulna District. Over 200 villages were destroyed in the district, leaving several thousand people homeless, and there was extensive damage to crops.

=== Extremely Severe Cyclonic Storm Thirteen ===
- Extremely severe cyclonic storm (IMD)
- Category 4 tropical cyclone (SSHWS)
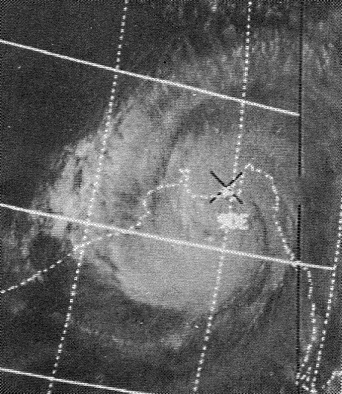
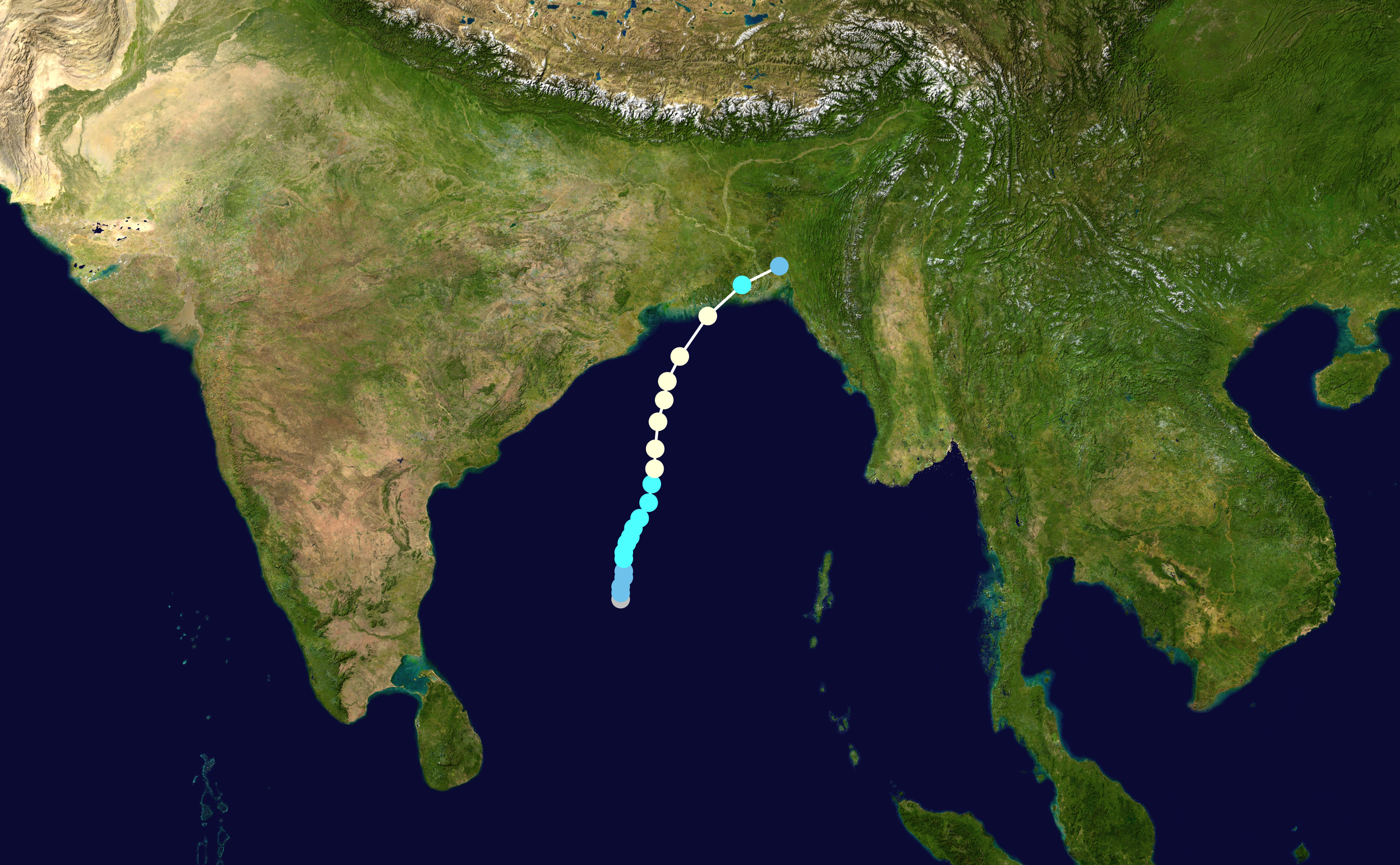
- Duration: November 8 – November 13
- Peak intensity: 185 km/h (115 mph) (3-min); 960 hPa (mbar)

On the morning of November 8, a depression formed in the south-central Bay of Bengal. It moved very slowly to the north, becoming a cyclonic storm on the next day. The cyclone continued to intensify as it approached the head of the Bay, becoming the third severe cyclonic storm of the season on November 11. That evening, it reached its peak intensity, with 3-min sustained winds of 185 km/h (115 mph), and 1-min sustained winds of 240 km/h (150 mph), having a well-developed eye, becoming the strongest storm of the season. On November 11 the Indian 5500 tonne freighter the Mahajagmitra reported wind speeds of 180 miles an hour and relayed a distress signal before it sank off the East Coast of India with 50 people on board. The vortex then made landfall on the coast of East Pakistan during the night of November 12. The cyclone weakened rapidly as it moved inland and dissipated on the next day, over south Assam.

This cyclone brought a devastating storm surge of up to 10 metres (33 feet) high to the Ganges Delta. Largely as a result of this surge, somewhere between 300,000 and 500,000 people lost their lives, making this storm the deadliest tropical cyclone ever recorded and one of the deadliest natural disasters of modern times. The total damage from the storm exceeded $85 million (1970 USD, $480 million 2008 USD), and much of the agricultural and fishing capacity of the region was wiped out. A total of some 3.6 million people suffered direct effects from this cyclone.

The Pakistani government was severely criticized for its handling of the relief operations following the storm, both by local political leaders in East Pakistan and in the international media. In the December national elections, the opposition Awami League gained a landslide victory, gaining 160 of the 162 East Pakistani seats. Continuing unrest between East Pakistanis and the central government trigged the Bangladesh Liberation War, which concluded with the creation of the state of Bangladesh. This is one of the first times that a natural event helped to trigger a civil war in the modern era.

=== Deep Depression Fourteen ===
- Deep depression (IMD)
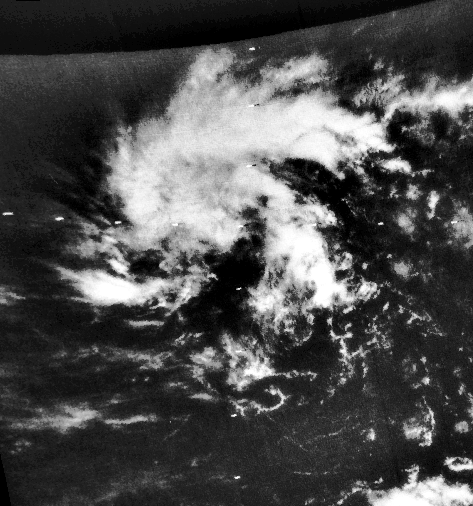
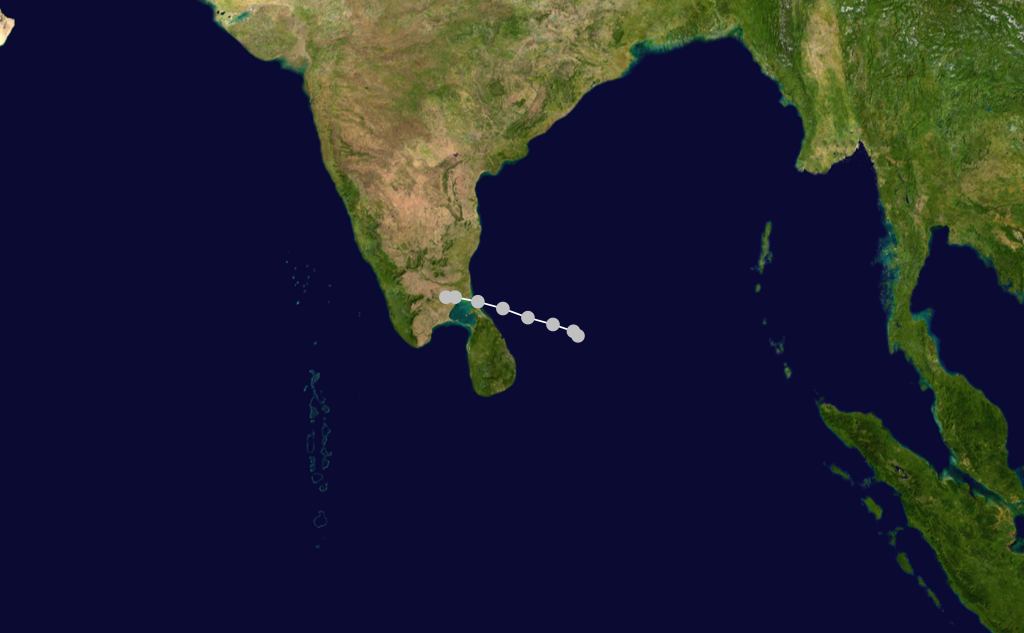
- Duration: November 19 – November 20
- Peak intensity: ≥50 km/h (30 mph) (3-min);

A low-pressure are that had developed over the south Andaman Sea moved west across the southern Bay of Bengal, and organized into a depression on the morning of November 19, when it was situated about 600 km (370 mi) southeast of Madras. The system intensified further into a deep depression, as it moved west-northwestward, and made landfall on Tamil Nadu on the following day. The depression subsequently weakened into a remnant low over Tamil Nadu. The depression brought widespread rain to much of Tamil Nadu, with heavy rain impacting the coastal regions. Low-lying coastal regions from Pondicherry to Atirampattinam. There was damage to crops and housing in Thanjavur District and the rains left thousands homeless in Madras. Cuddalore experienced exceptionally heavy rains with over 440 mm (17 in) falling there, of which 310 mm (12 in) fell on November 20 alone.

=== Cyclonic Storm Fifteen ===
- Cyclonic storm (IMD)
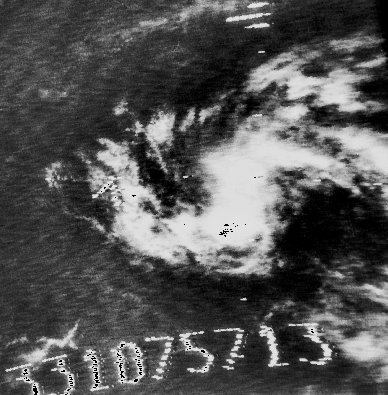
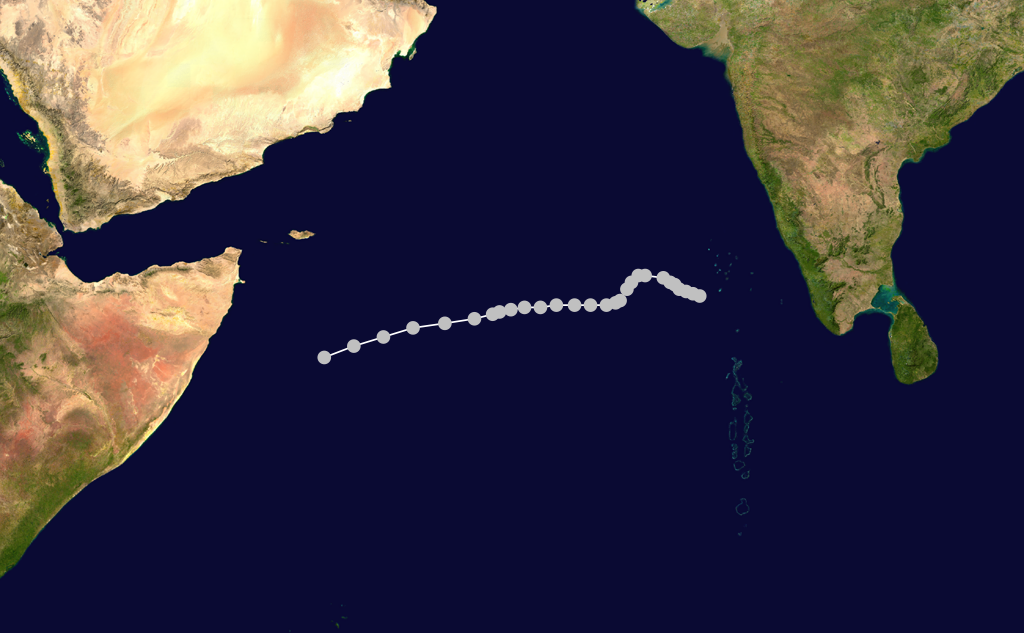
- Duration: November 22 – November 29
- Peak intensity: 75 km/h (45 mph) (3-min);

The remnant low of a depression emerged into the Arabian Sea off Kerala late on November 21, and developed into a new depression on the next day, as it moved westward. The depression moved further west, and gradually turned toward the southwest, intensifying as it did so. It became a cyclonic storm on November 28, to the southeast of Socotra, and reached its peak intensity with winds of 75 km/h (45 mph) soon after. The cyclone continued to move west-southwestward, and rapidly weakened into a remnant low-pressure area off the Somalia coast on the next day, ending the season. The cyclone brought widespread rain to the Laccadives from November 22 to 24, with 60 mm (2.4 in) recorded on Amini on November 23.

== Season effects ==
This is a table of all storms in the 1970 North Indian Ocean cyclone season. It mentions all of the season's storms and their names, durations, peak intensities (according to the IMD storm scale), areas affected, damages, and death totals. Damage and death totals include the damage and deaths caused when that storm was a precursor wave or extratropical low, and all of the damage figures are in 1970 USD.

Name	Dates	Peak intensity			Areas affected	Damage (USD)	Deaths	Ref(s).
Name	Dates	Category	Wind speed	Pressure	Areas affected	Damage (USD)	Deaths	Ref(s).
One	May 2–7, 1970	Very severe cyclonic storm	150 km/h (95 mph)	975 hPa (28.79 inHg)	Bangladesh, Myanmar			
Two	May 23–24, 1970	Depression	Not specified	Not specified	Bangladesh, Myanmar			
Three	May 28 – June 2, 1970	Severe Cyclonic Storm	95 km/h (60 mph)	986 hPa (29.12 inHg)	Saudi Arabia			
Four	June 7–8, 1970	Cyclonic Storm	65 km/h (40 mph)	982 hPa (29.00 inHg)	West Bengal, Orissa, Madhya Pradesh			
Five	June 29 – July 3, 1970	Deep Depression	Not specified	Not specified	Orissa			
Six	July 6–8, 1970	Deep Depression	Not specified	Not specified	Burma, Orissa			
Seven	August 17–19, 1970	Deep Depression	Not specified	Not specified	Burma, Orissa			
Eight	September 2–13, 1970	Cyclonic Storm	Not specified	Not specified	West Bengal, Orissa, Coastal Arabia			
Nine	September 8–18, 1970	Deep Depression	Not specified	Not specified	Burma, West Bengsl			
Ten	September 21–23, 1970	Depression	Not specified	Not specified	Andra Pradesh			
Eleven	October 11–13, 1970	Depression	Not specified	Not specified	Saudi Arabia			
Twelve	October 18–22, 1970	Very Severe Cyclonic Storm	130 km/h (80 mph)	980 hPa (28.94 inHg)	Tamil Nadu, West Bengal, Bangladesh		200-300	
Thirteen	November 8–13, 1970	Extremely Severe Cyclonic Storm	185 km/h (115 mph)	966 hPa (28.53 inHg)	India, Bangladesh		300,000–500,000	
Fourteen	November 19–20, 1970	Deep Depression	Not specified	Not specified	Tamil Nadu			
Fifteen	November 22–29, 1970	Cyclonic Storm	75 km/h (45 mph)	Not specified	Somalia			
Season aggregates
15 systems	May 2 – November 29, 1970		150 km/h (95 mph)	975 hPa (28.79 inHg)		Unknown	≥302,000	

== See also ==
- North Indian Ocean tropical cyclone
- List of tropical cyclone records
- 1970 Atlantic hurricane season
- 1970 Pacific hurricane season
- 1970 Pacific typhoon season
- Australian cyclone seasons: 1969–70, 1970–71
- South Pacific cyclone seasons: 1969–70, 1970–71
- South-West Indian Ocean cyclone seasons: 1969–70, 1970–71
