= 1969–70 Australian region cyclone season =

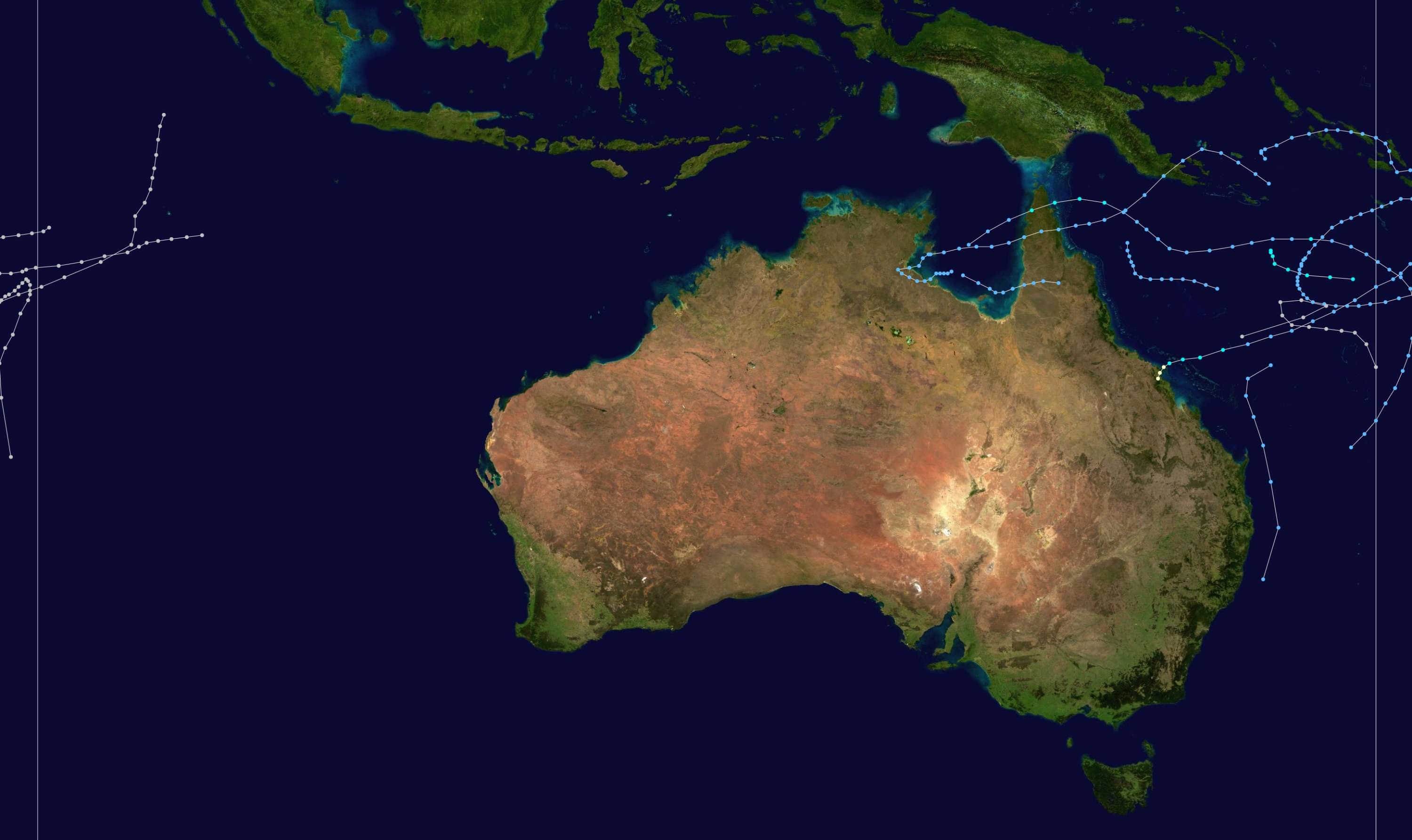
- Season summary map

Seasonal boundaries
- First system formed: 8 November 1969
- Last system dissipated: 9 May 1970

Strongest storm
- Name: Judy
  - Maximum winds: 130 km/h (80 mph)
  - Lowest pressure: 960 hPa (mbar)

Seasonal statistics
- Tropical lows: 14
- Tropical cyclones: 14
- Severe tropical cyclones: 1
- Total fatalities: 14
- Total damage: Unknown

Related articles
- 1969–70 South Pacific cyclone season; 1969–70 South-West Indian Ocean cyclone season

The 1969–70 Australian region cyclone season was an above-average tropical cyclone season. It ran from 1 November 1969 to 30 April 1970. The regional tropical cyclone operational plan also defines a "tropical cyclone year" separately from a "tropical cyclone season", with the "tropical cyclone year" for this season lasting from 1 July 1969 to 30 June 1970.

== Systems ==
=== Cyclone Blossom ===
- Tropical storm (SSHWS)
- Duration: November 8 – November 9
- Peak intensity: 65 km/h (40 mph) (1-min);

A weak tropical cyclone, Blossom formed on November 8 to the northwest of Cocos Islands. It dissipated, the next day.

=== Cyclone Diane-Françoise ===
- Category 1 tropical cyclone (SSHWS)
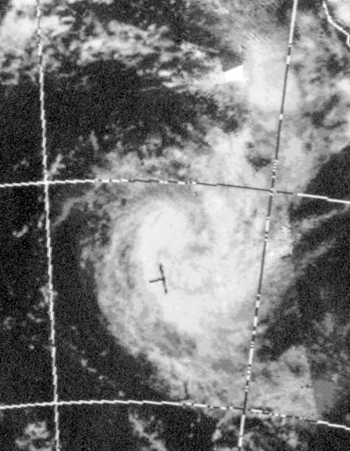
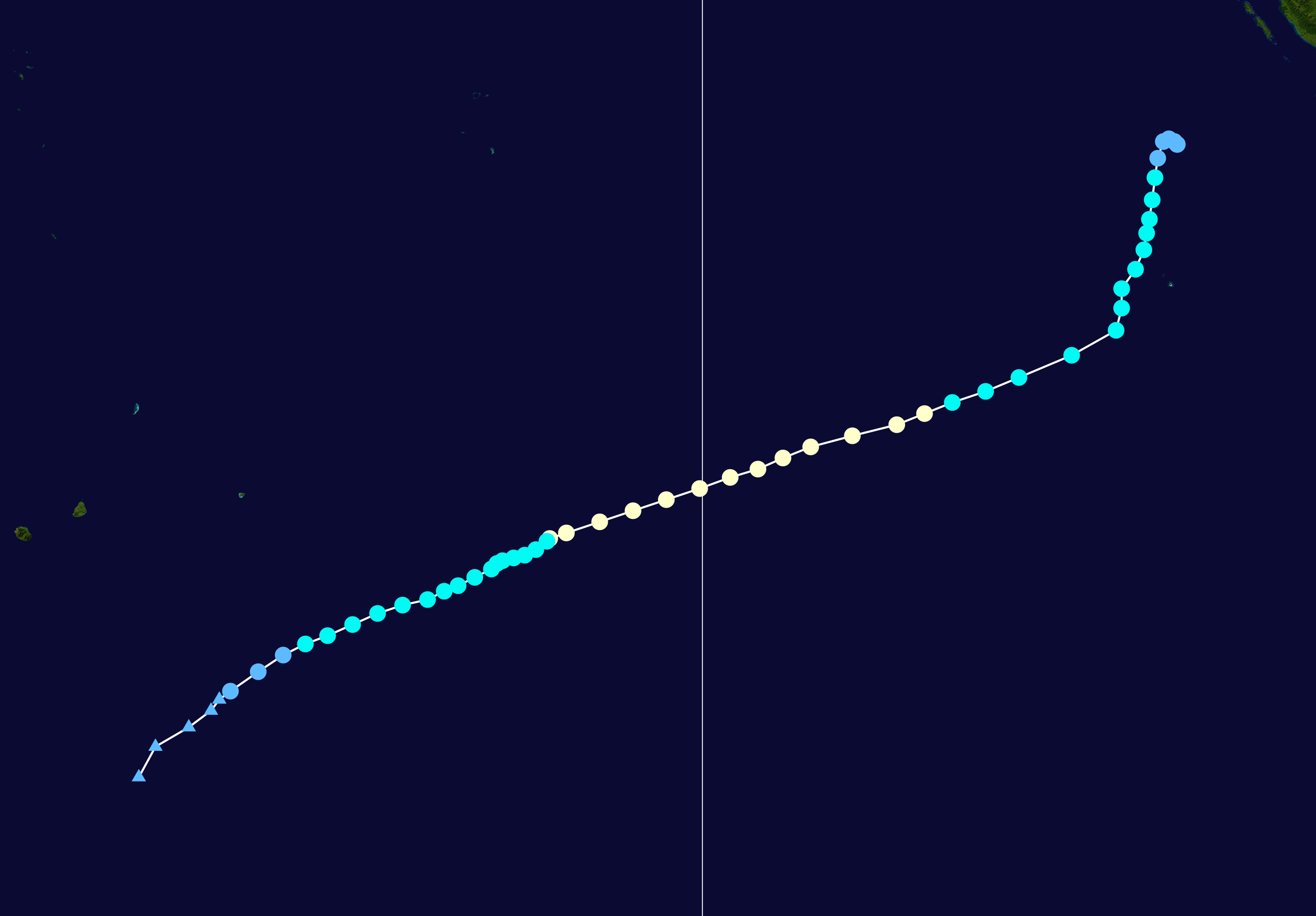
- Duration: January 3 – January 9 _{(Exited basin)}
- Peak intensity: 130 km/h (80 mph) (1-min); 996 hPa (mbar)

A tropical low formed on January 3. It soon developed to become Cyclone Diane, before crossing to the South-West Indian Ocean basin on January 9.

=== Severe Tropical Cyclone Ada ===
- Category 3 severe tropical cyclone (Australian scale)
- Category 2 tropical cyclone (SSHWS)
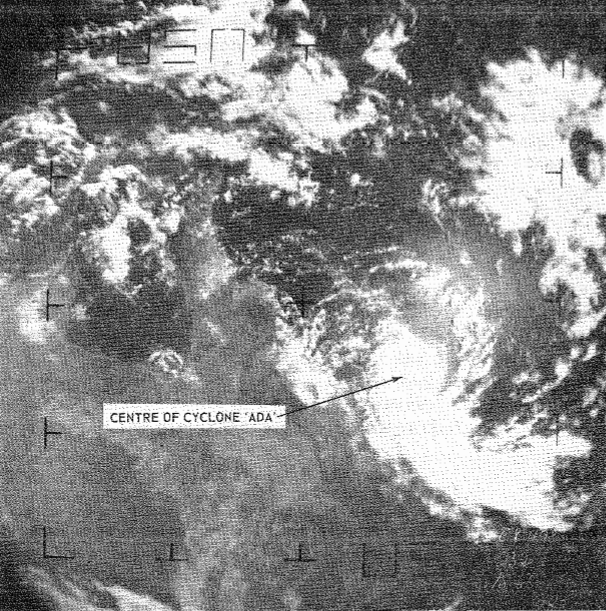
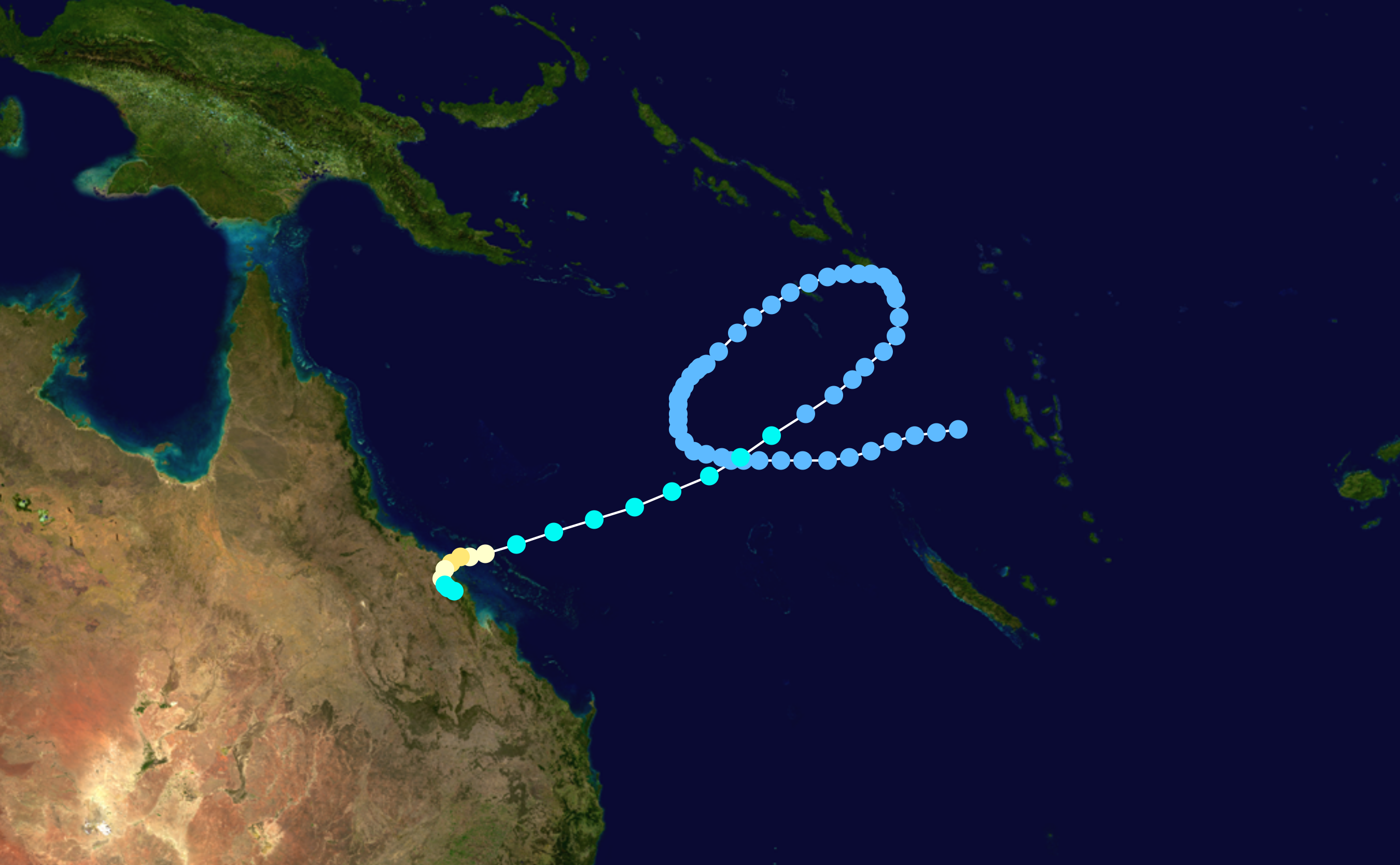
- Duration: January 3 – January 19
- Peak intensity: 150 km/h (90 mph) (10-min); 962 hPa (mbar)

Tropical Cyclone Ada was a Category 3 cyclone that killed 14 people when it hit Queensland's Whitsunday Island Resorts and the adjacent Whitsunday Coast mainland on January 17, 1970.

Resorts and boats were destroyed or severely damaged at Hayman, Daydream and South Molle Islands, as well as the two resorts – Happy Bay and Palm Bay – on Long Island. About 80% of buildings in the mainland centres of Shute Harbour, Airlie Beach and Cannonvale were severely damaged. Some damage occurred also inland at Proserpine where, following 24-hours of heavy rain that accompanied the storm, the Proserpine River peaked at 11.16 metres: its highest recorded flood. Fourteen people died and property damage was estimated at A$390 million (1997 values).

Like Tropical Cyclone Tracy that devastated Darwin on Christmas Eve 1974, Ada was small in diameter (estimated width 30 km) and damage from her path was limited to a comparatively small geographical area. The wind from Tropical Cyclone Ada was not felt in Bowen (60 km to the north) or Mackay (120 km to the south). However, the heavy rains did cause flooding in the Pioneer River (Mackay) and the Don River (Bowen). Before degenerating into a rainstorm Cyclone Ada travelled further inland to the Cathu State Forest (83 km north-west of Mackay behind the small Bruce Highway township of Calen) and caused extensive damage to the eucalypts, rainforest and pine plantations in that area.

It was as a result of complaints about the lack of timely warning about the 1970 cyclone that the Bureau of Meteorology introduced the cyclone warning siren that now accompanies all media broadcasts and telecasts of cyclone warnings in Queensland.

=== Cyclone Glynis ===
- Category 1 tropical cyclone (SSHWS)
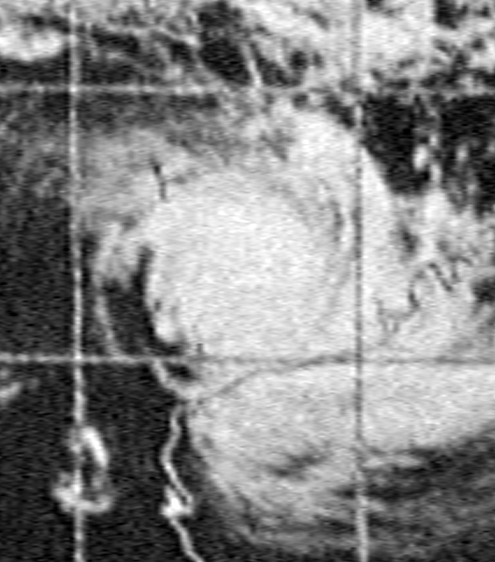
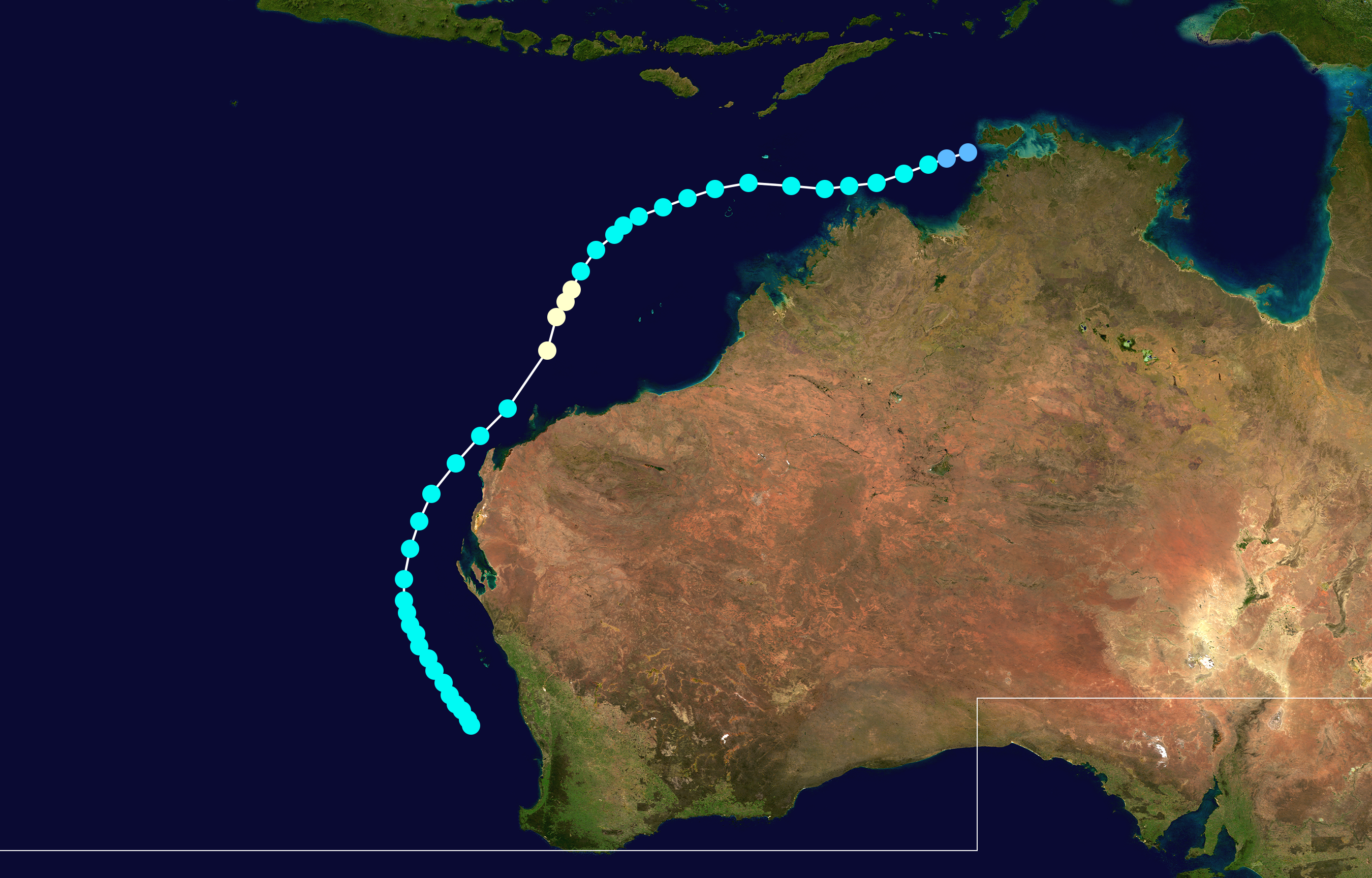
- Duration: January 27 – February 6
- Peak intensity: 140 km/h (85 mph) (1-min); 970 hPa (mbar)

Cyclone Glynis formed on January 27 near the Northern Territory. It moved to the southwest before crossing the coast, near Mandurah, Western Australia. It was last noted on February 6. There were no damages and fatalities reported.

=== Cyclone Harriet-Iseult ===
- Tropical storm (SSHWS)
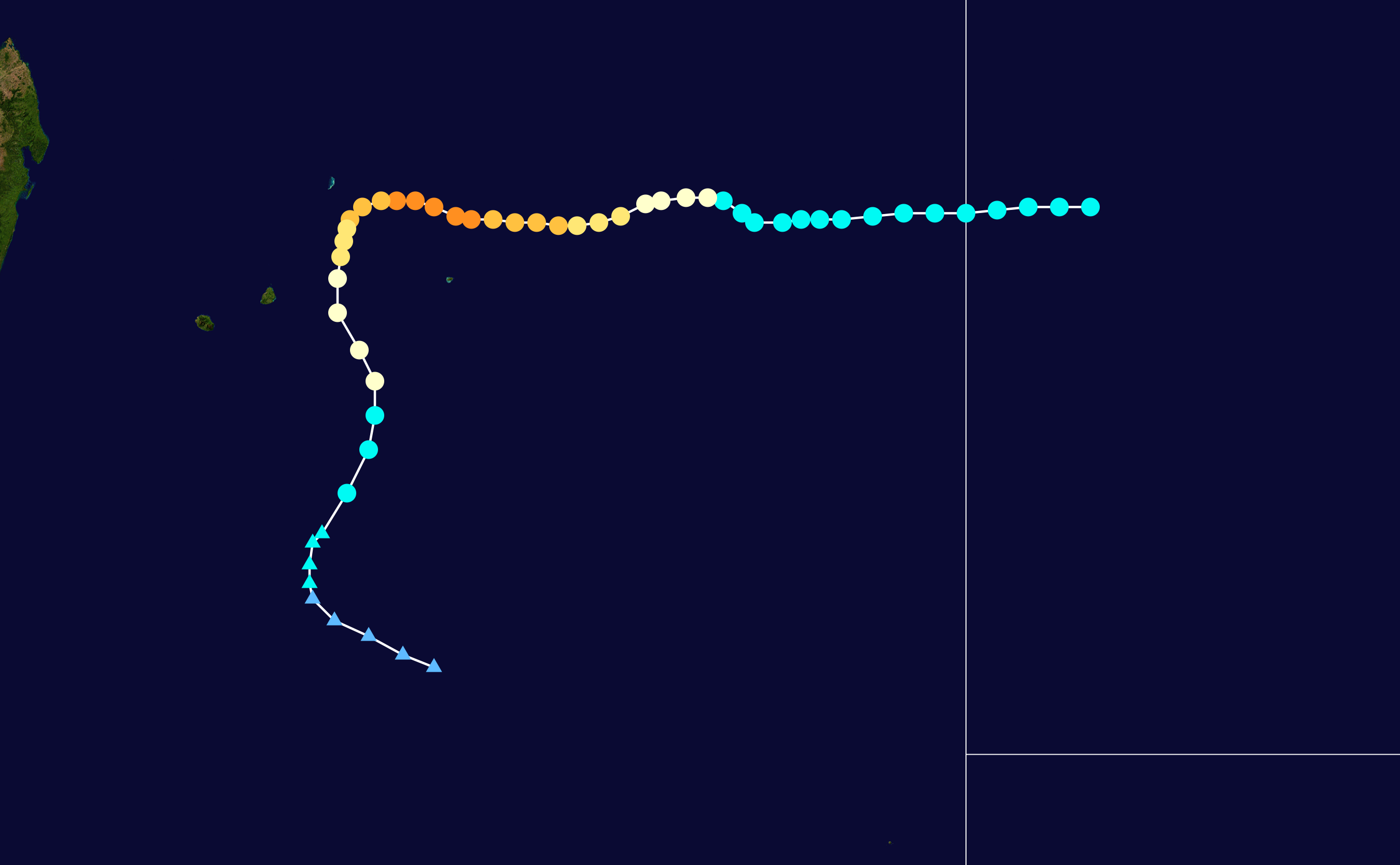
- Duration: February 2 – February 3 _{(Exited basin)}
- Peak intensity: 65 km/h (40 mph) (1-min);

Harriet formed in the western portion of the basin on February 2, strengthening to a tropical storm before moving on the South-West Indian Ocean basin on the next day, where it was renamed Iseult.

=== Cyclone Ingrid ===
- Category 1 tropical cyclone (SSHWS)
- Duration: February 9 – February 17
- Peak intensity: 140 km/h (85 mph) (1-min); 970 hPa (mbar)

Cyclone Ingrid developed on February 9 near Western Australia. It crossed the coast near Carnarvon, Western Australia on an unknown date, causing severe agricultural damage. It was last noted on February 17, to the west-northwest of Perth.

=== Cyclone Judy ===
- Category 1 tropical cyclone (SSHWS)
- Duration: February 9 – February 24
- Peak intensity: 130 km/h (80 mph) (1-min); 960 hPa (mbar)

Cyclone Judy was first seen on February 9, developing in the central Indian Ocean. Peaking as a Category 1- equivalent hurricane, it executed a small counterclockwise loop before it was last noted on February 24.

=== Cyclone Dawn ===
- Category 2 tropical cyclone (Australian scale)
- Tropical storm (SSHWS)
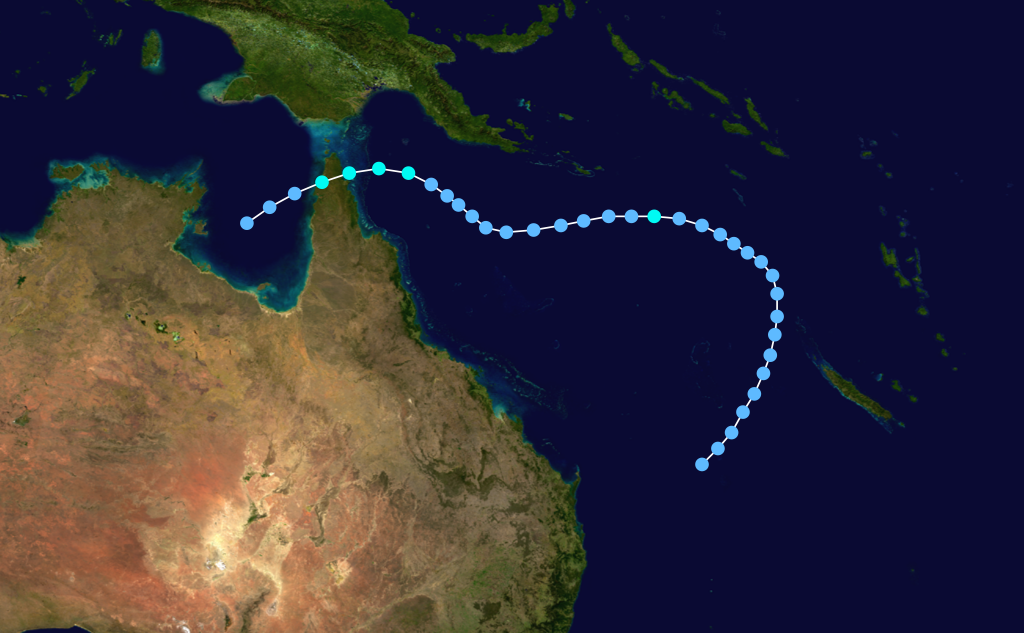
- Duration: February 10 – February 19
- Peak intensity: 100 km/h (65 mph) (10-min); 980 hPa (mbar)

Cyclone Dawn formed on February 10 in the Gulf of Carpentaria, before moving inland. It moved offshore towards the Coral Sea and continued its westward motion. Then it turned to the south until it was last noted on February 19. It affected the Far North Queensland and New Caledonia with heavy rain.

=== Cyclone Florence ===
- Tropical storm (SSHWS)
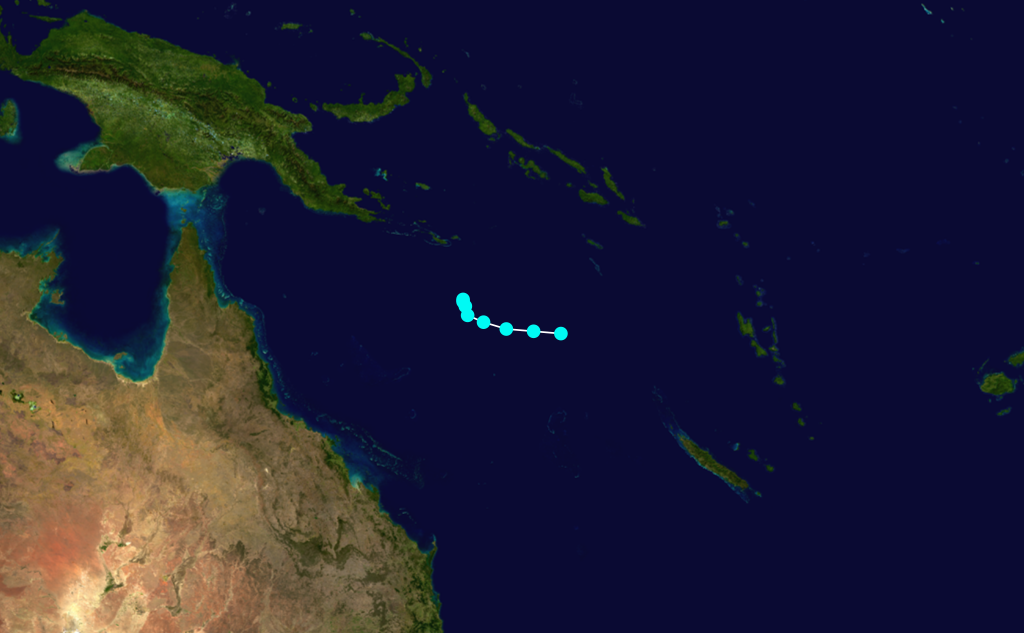
- Duration: February 10 – February 12
- Peak intensity: 85 km/h (50 mph) (1-min); 990 hPa (mbar)

A weak cyclone, Florence developed on February 10 in the Coral Sea. It was last noted, two days later.

=== Cyclone Cindy ===
- Tropical depression (SSHWS)
- Duration: March 15 – March 20
- Peak intensity: 35 km/h (25 mph) (1-min); 996 hPa (mbar)

Another tropical cyclone, Cindy formed on March 15 in the Gulf of Carpentaria. It was last seen on March 20.

=== Cyclone Kathy-Michelle ===
- Category 2 tropical cyclone (SSHWS)
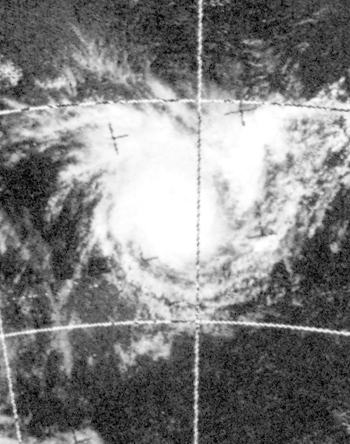
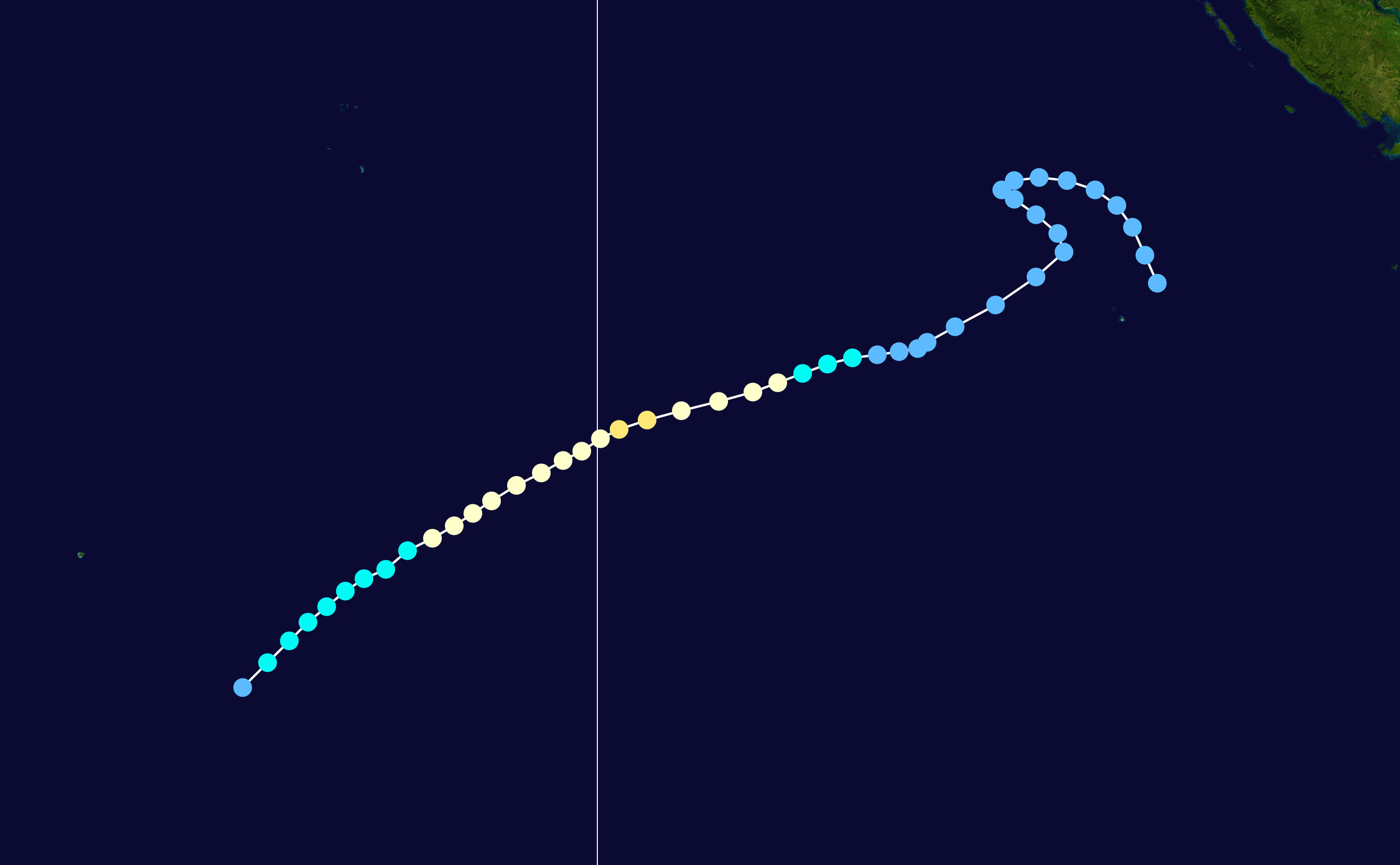
- Duration: March 19 – March 25 _{(Exited basin)}
- Peak intensity: 155 km/h (100 mph) (1-min); 990 hPa (mbar)

Cyclone Kathy formed on March 19 in the central Indian Ocean. It moved to the west-southwest before moving on the South-West Indian Ocean basin on March 25, where it was redesignated as Tropical Cyclone Michelle.

=== Cyclone Isa ===
- Category 1 tropical cyclone (Australian scale)
- Tropical storm (SSHWS)
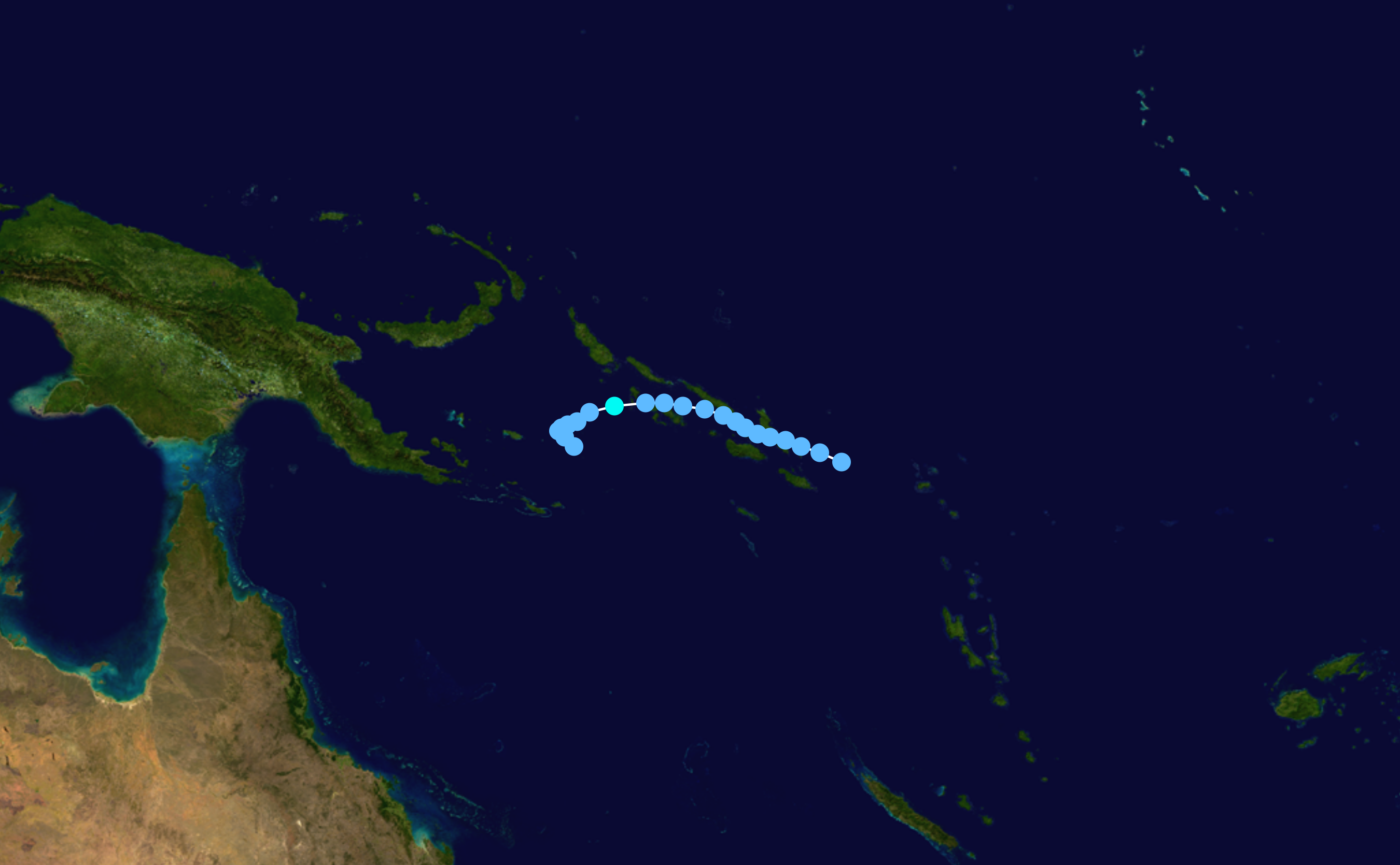
- Duration: April 14 – April 19 (exited basin)
- Peak intensity: 75 km/h (45 mph) (10-min); 990 hPa (mbar)

Tropical Cyclone Isa formed on April 14 near the Solomon Islands. It impacted the island country before it was last noted as it moved out of the basin into the South Pacific basin on April 19.

=== Cyclone Lulu ===
- Tropical storm (SSHWS)
- Duration: May 4 – May 9
- Peak intensity: 65 km/h (40 mph) (1-min); 996 hPa (mbar)

Cyclone Lulu formed on May 4 to the west of Port Hedland. It moved to the west before striking Western Australia, near Mundabullangana on May 8. It was last noted near Whim Creek, the next day.

It caused flooding around the Pilbara region; however, it was unknown if there are reports of fatalities attributed to the cyclone.

=== Other systems ===
On November 14, a tropical low formed and lasted until the next day. Another tropical low developed on March 1 and was last noted on March 5.

== Season effects ==
1969–70 Australian region cyclone season
Name	Dates	Peak intensity			Areas affected	Damage (US$)	Deaths
Name	Dates	Category	Wind speed (km/h (mph))	Pressure (hPa)	Areas affected	Damage (US$)	Deaths
Blossom	8–9 Nov	Category 1 tropical cyclone	65 (40)	Not specified	Cocos Islands	None	0
Unspecified	14–15 Nov	Tropical low	45 (30)	Not specified	None	None	0
Ada	3–19 Jan	Category 3 severe tropical cyclone	150 (90)	962	Queensland	12 million	14
Diane	3–9 Jan	Category 3 severe tropical cyclone	130 (80)	996	None	None	0
Glynis	27 Jan – 6 Feb	Category 3 severe tropical cyclone	140 (85)	970	Northern Territory, Western Australia	Unknown	0
Harriet	2–3 Feb	Category 1 tropical cyclone	65 (40)	Not specified	None	None	0
Ingrid	9–17 Feb	Category 3 severe tropical cyclone	140 (85)	970	Western Australia	Unknown	Unknown
Judy	9–24 Feb	Category 3 severe tropical cyclone	130 (80)	960	None	None	0
Dawn	10–19 Feb	Category 2 tropical cyclone	100 (65)	980	Far North Queensland, New Caledonia	None	0
Florence	10–12 Feb	Category 1 tropical cyclone	85 (50)	990	None	None	0
Unspecified	1–5 Mar	Tropical low	45 (30)	Not specified	None	None	0
Cindy	15–20 Mar	Category 1 tropical cyclone	65 (40)	996	Northern Territory, Queensland	None	0
Kathy	19–25 Mar	Category 2 tropical cyclone	155 (100)	990	Northern Territory, Queensland	None	0
Isa	14–19 Apr	Category 1 tropical cyclone	75 (45)	990	Solomon Islands	None	0
Lulu	4–9 May	Category 1 tropical cyclone	65 (40)	996	Western Australia	Unknown	Unknown
Season aggregates
15 systems	8 Nov – 9 May		155 (100)	960		12 million	14

== See also ==
- Atlantic hurricane seasons: 1969, 1970
- Eastern Pacific hurricane seasons: 1969, 1970
- Western Pacific typhoon seasons: 1969, 1970
- North Indian Ocean cyclone seasons: 1969, 1970
