= 1969–70 South Pacific cyclone season =

Tropical cyclone season

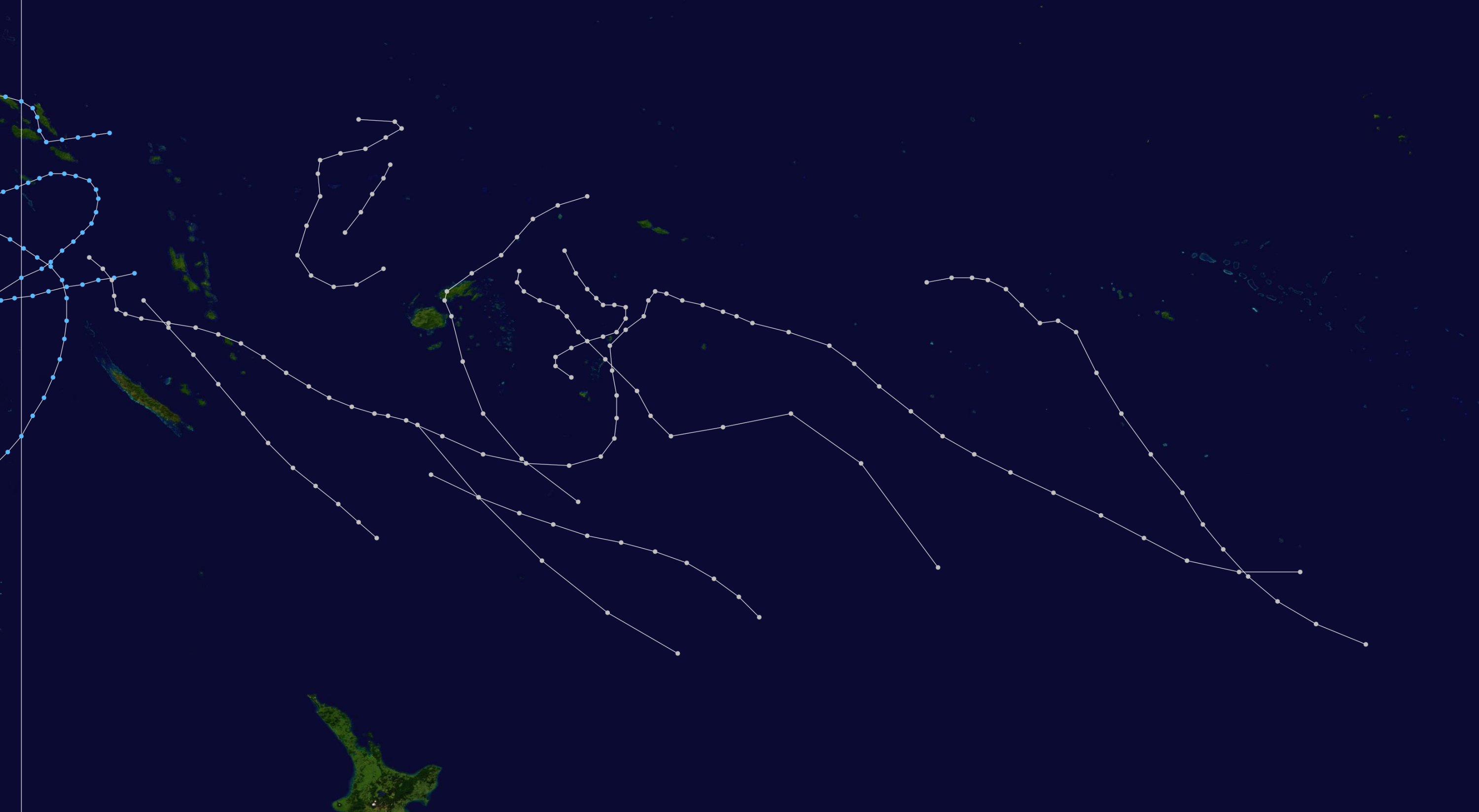
- Season summary map

Seasonal boundaries
- First system formed: February 10, 1970
- Last system dissipated: April 19, 1970

Strongest storm
- Name: Dolly & Emma
  - Maximum winds: 130 km/h (80 mph) (10-minute sustained)
  - Lowest pressure: 965 hPa (mbar)

Seasonal statistics
- Total disturbances: 7
- Tropical cyclones: 5
- Severe tropical cyclones: 2
- Total fatalities: 6
- Total damage: $5 million (1970 USD)

Related articles
- 1969–70 South-West Indian Ocean cyclone season; 1969–70 Australian region cyclone season

The 1969–70 South Pacific cyclone season was a very inactive season, featuring only seven disturbances, five tropical cyclones, and two severe tropical cyclones. The season featured only one landfalling storm, Cyclone Dawn. Dawn formed very late, on February 10, and the last storm, Tropical Depression Isa, dissipated early, on April 19. On January 2, a tropical low developed into a weak depression on the Coral Sea. It later crossed into the Australian Region, where it strengthened to Severe Tropical Cyclone Ada.

== Systems ==
=== Tropical Cyclone Dawn ===
- Category 2 tropical cyclone (Australian scale)
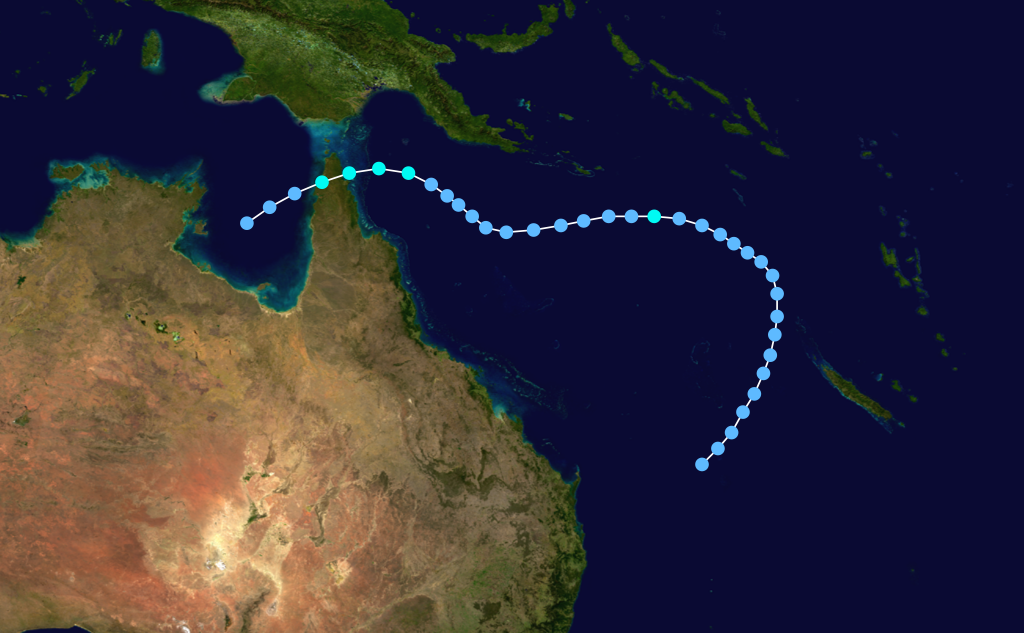
- Duration: February 16 – February 19
- Peak intensity: 100 km/h (65 mph) (10-min); 980 hPa (mbar)

Dawn formed on February 16 on the Gulf of Carpentaria as a tropical low. It strengthened to a Category 2 tropical cyclone (Australian scale) before dissipating, northwest of Brisbane on the South Pacific basin.

=== Severe Tropical Cyclone Dolly ===
- Category 3 severe tropical cyclone (Australian scale)
- Category 1 tropical cyclone (SSHWS)
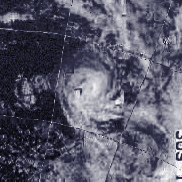
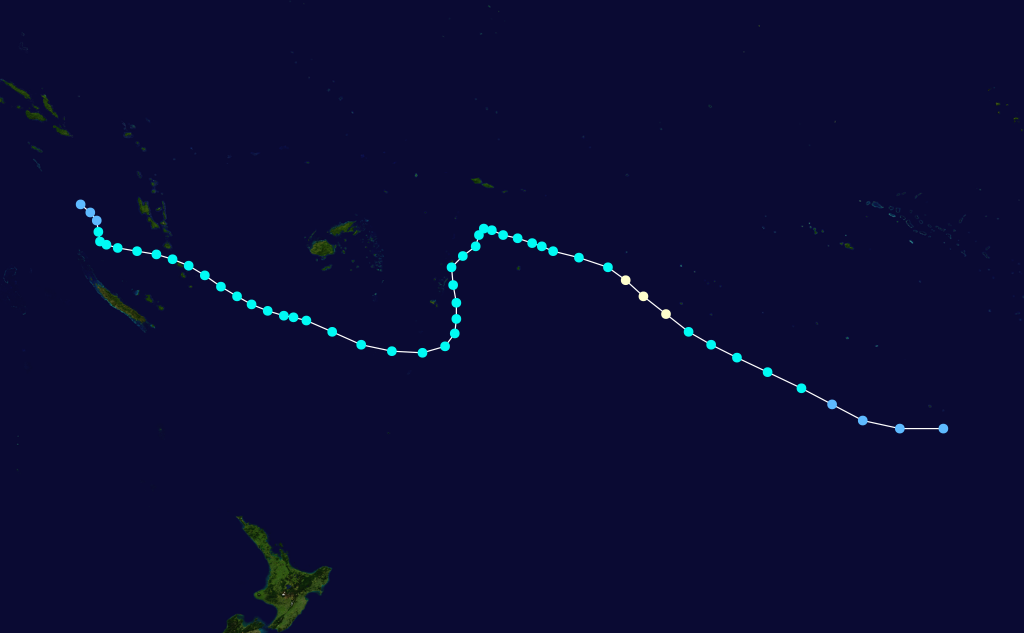
- Duration: February 11 – February 25
- Peak intensity: 130 km/h (80 mph) (10-min); 965 hPa (mbar)

Dolly formed to the east of Luganville on February 11, and was last noted on February 25 to the north of French Polynesia. It peaked as a Category 1 tropical cyclone (SSHWS) or Category 3 severe tropical cyclone (Australian scale).

=== Severe Tropical Cyclone Emma ===
- Category 3 severe tropical cyclone (Australian scale)
- Category 1 tropical cyclone (SSHWS)
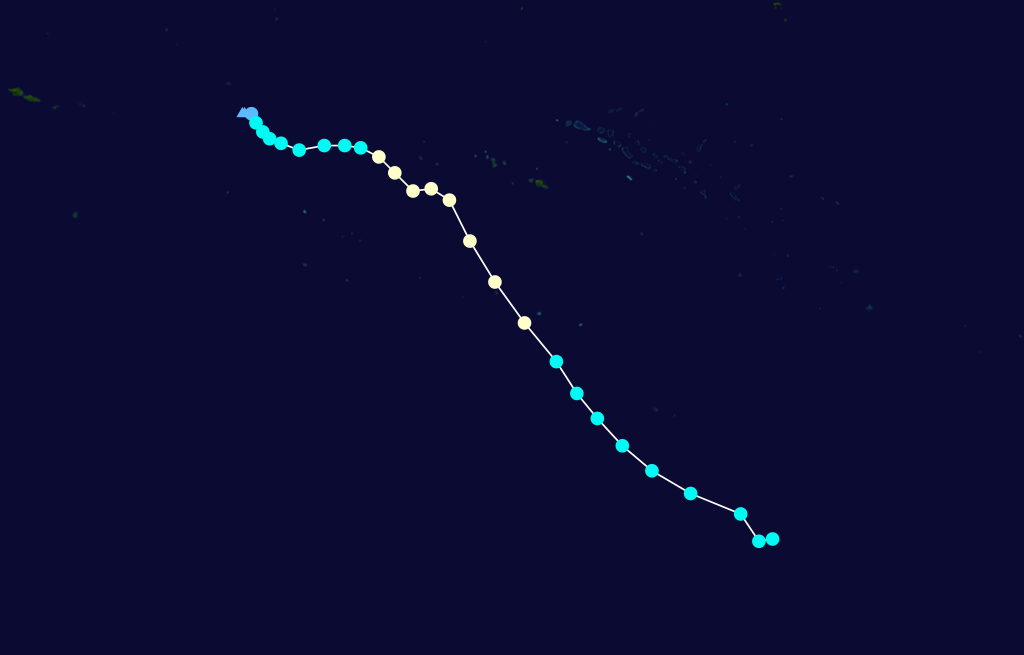
- Duration: February 27 – March 6
- Peak intensity: 130 km/h (80 mph) (10-min); 965 hPa (mbar)

Severe Tropical Cyclone Emma originated as a depression to the west of Wallis and Futuna. It moved to the south-southeast before it was last noted on March 6 to the north of French Polynesia.

=== Tropical Cyclone Gillian ===
- Category 1 tropical cyclone (Australian scale)
- Tropical storm (SSHWS)
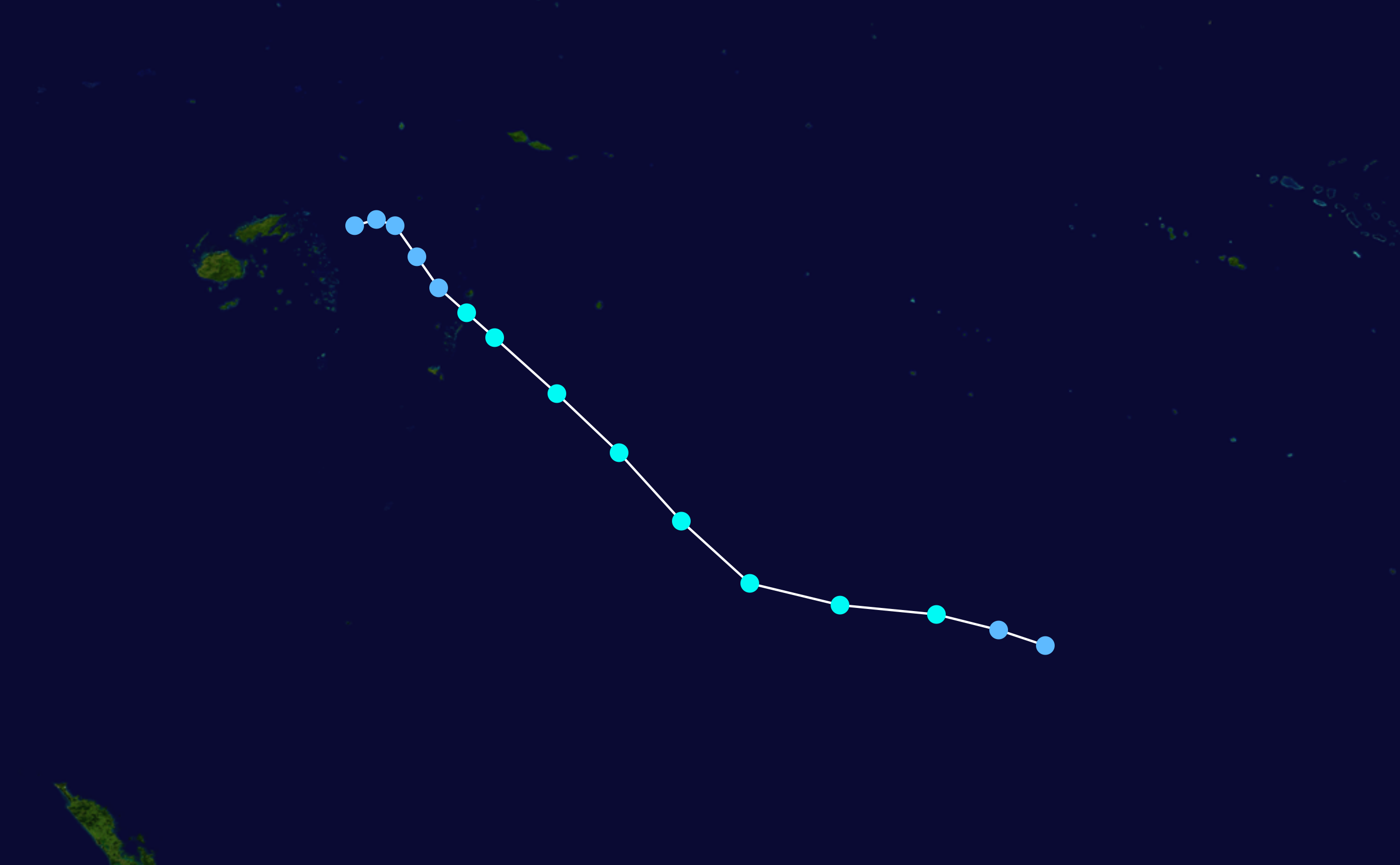
- Duration: April 7 – April 11
- Peak intensity: 85 km/h (55 mph) (10-min); 980 hPa (mbar)

A disturbance developed to a depression, to the south-southwest of Fiji. It continued its L movement while strengthening to a tropical cyclone before weakening due to the cold waters and wind shear. Gillian was last noted, far south of Marshall Islands as it dissipated. It was strengthened to an equivalent of a tropical storm on the SSHWS scale.

=== Tropical Cyclone Helen ===
- Category 1 tropical cyclone (Australian scale)
- Tropical storm (SSHWS)
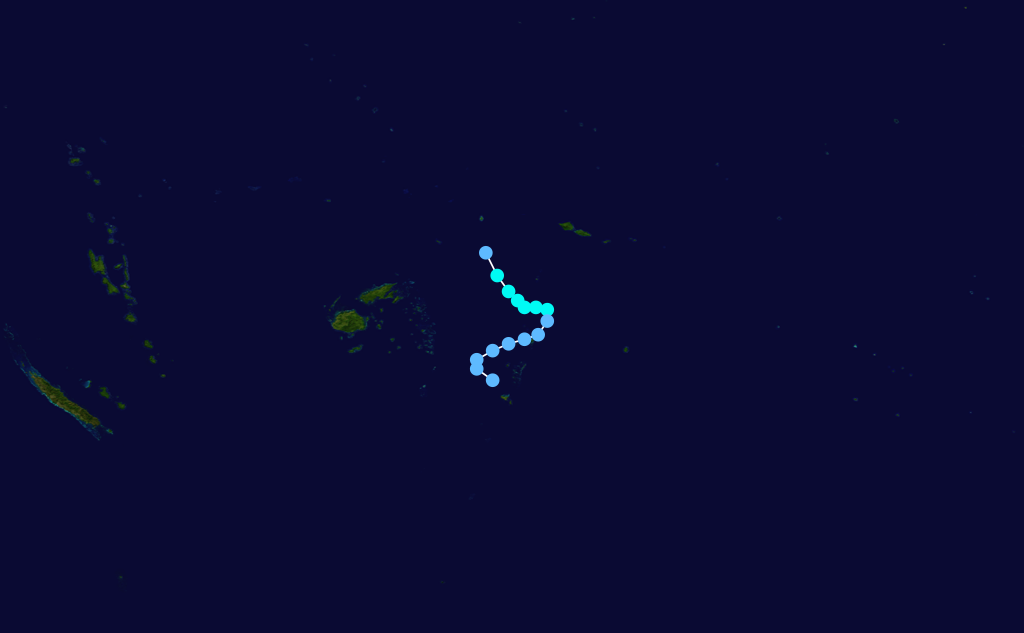
- Duration: April 13 – April 17
- Peak intensity: 75 km/h (45 mph) (10-min); 990 hPa (mbar)

A tropical low developed to a depression, south of Tuvalu. It traveled to the west, strengthening as Tropical Cyclone Helen before weakening. It was last noted on April 17, south-southwest of Fiji.

On April 17, 1970, Apollo 13 was making its final descent over the splashdown zone when they spotted a weakening Helen as they were re-entering the Earth's atmosphere. Mission control had been tracking the storm to make sure it did not interfere with the mission's re-entry.

=== Tropical Cyclone Isa ===
- Category 1 tropical cyclone (Australian scale)
- Tropical depression (SSHWS)
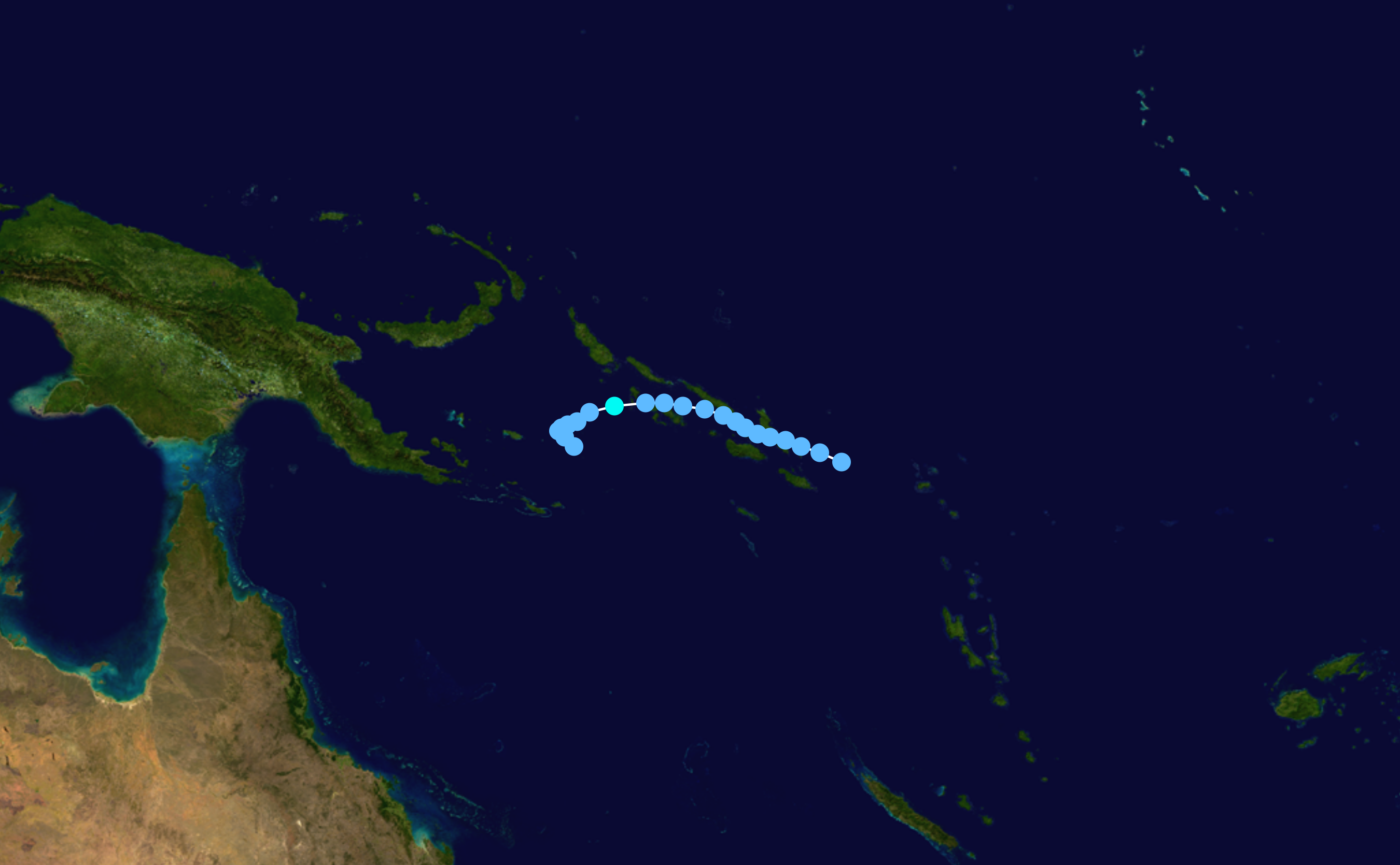
- Duration: April 14 (entered basin) – April 19
- Peak intensity: 75 km/h (45 mph) (10-min); 990 hPa (mbar)

It was unknown if the precursor to Isa was noted to the southeast, or to the southwest of Solomon Islands. It strengthened to a Category 1 tropical cyclone (Australian scale), but it remained a tropical depression (SSHWS). It was last noted on April 19, as it dissipated.

=== Other systems ===
During January 5, the Australian Bureau of Meteorology first noted the existence of a weak tropical depression over the eastern Coral Sea, however, it has since been determined that the depression developed during January 2 near 15.8°S 165.1°E. The system was subsequently tracked by infrequent satelitte imagery, which revealed that it slowly completed a cyclonic loop near the Solomon Islands before curving back toward the southwest. The system entered the Australian region during 15 January, where it subsequently became Severe Tropical Cyclone Ada before making landfall on Queensland during 17 January.

== Seasonal effects ==
1969–70 South Pacific cyclone season
Name	Dates active	Peak intensity			Areas affected	Damage (US$)	Deaths	Refs
Name	Dates active	Category	Wind speed	Pressure	Areas affected	Damage (US$)	Deaths	Refs
Ada	January 2 – 15	Tropical depression	55 km/h (35 mph)	997 hPa (29.44 inHg)	Solomon Islands, Vanuatu	Unknown	Unknown	
Alice	January 4	Unknown-strength storm	Unknown	Unknown		Unknown	Unknown	
Dawn	February 10 – 19	Category 2 tropical cyclone	100 km/h (65 mph)	980 hPa (28.94 inHg)		Unknown	Unknown	
Dolly	February 11 – 25	Category 3 severe tropical cyclone	130 km/h (80 mph)	965 hPa (28.50 inHg)		Unknown	Unknown	
Emma	March 2 – 4	Category 3 severe tropical cyclone	130 km/h (80 mph)	965 hPa (28.50 inHg)		Unknown	Unknown	
Gillian	April 7 – 11	Category 1 tropical cyclone	75 km/h (45 mph)	990 hPa (29.23 inHg)		Unknown	Unknown	
Helen	April 13 – 17	Category 1 tropical cyclone	75 km/h (45 mph)	990 hPa (29.23 inHg)		Unknown	Unknown	
Isa	April 14 – 19	Category 1 tropical cyclone	75 km/h (45 mph)	990 hPa (29.23 inHg)		Unknown	Unknown	
Season aggregates
8 systems	January 2 – April 19, 1970		130 km/h (80 mph)	965 hPa (28.50 inHg)				
