= Hannah (name) =

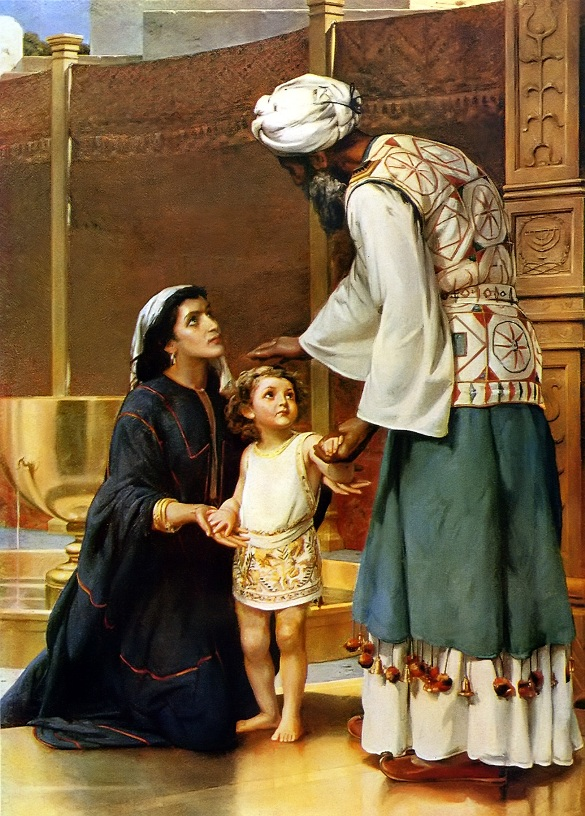
- Samuel Dedicated by Hannah at the Temple by Frank W.W. Topham
- Gender: Female
- Language: Hebrew, Arabic, Aramaic

Origin
- Meaning: Favour

Other names
- Related names: Chana; Hana; Hanna; Hanah; Anne; Anna; Anku; Anke; Anka; Ana

Hannah, also spelled Hanna, Hana, Hanah, or Chana, is a feminine given name of Hebrew origin (Hebrew: חַנָּה, romanized: Ḥannāh). It is derived from the root ḥ-n-n, meaning "favour" or "grace". A Dictionary of First Names attributes the name to a word meaning 'He (God) has favoured me with a child'. Anne, Ana, Ann, and other variants of the name derive from the Hellenized Hebrew, Anna (Ἄννα).

== Etymology ==
The Phoenician (Punic) name Hannibal derives from the same Canaanite root and means "My grace is Baal". In the Books of Samuel of the Tanakh, Hannah is Samuel's mother.

== Hannah ==
=== People ===
- Hannah Caroline Aase (1883–1980), American botanist and cytologist
- Hannah Adams (1755–1831), American author
- Hannah Afriyie (born 1951), Ghanaian sprinter
- Hannah Aitchison (born 1966), American tattoo artist
- Hannah Al Rashid (born 1986), British actress, model and activist of Indonesian descent
- Hannah Alcorn (born 1990), American voice actress
- Hannah Aldworth (died 1778), English philanthropist
- Hannah Allam (born 1977), Egyptian-American journalist and reporter
- Hannah Allen (1638–?), British writer
- Hannah Alligood, American actress
- Hannah Alper, Canadian activist
- Hannah Altman, Jewish American photographer
- Hannah Anderson, several people
- Hannah Arendt (1906–1975), German Jewish philosopher
- Hannah Arnold, several people
- Hannah Arterian (born 1949), American law school dean
- Hannah Arterton (born 1989), British actor and singer
- Hannah Aspden (born 2000), American Paralympic swimmer
- Hannah Lillith Assadi, American author
- Hannah Atkins (1923–2010), American politician
- Hannah Auchentaller (born 2001), Italian biathlete
- Hannah August, American press secretary
- Hannah Idowu Dideolu Awolowo (1915–2015), Nigerian businesswoman and politician
- Hannah Johnston Bailey (1839–1923), American Quaker teacher, activist and advocate
- Hannah Baker (born 2004), English cricketer
- Hannah Ball (1734–1792), English Wesleyan Methodist
- Hannah Baptiste, Guyanese footballer
- Hannah Bardell (born 1983), Scottish politician
- Hannah Connell Barker (1844–1918), American businesswoman
- Hannah Barnes (born 1993), British cyclist
- Hannah Barnett-Trager (1870–1943), English writer and activist
- Hannah Bast, German computer scientist
- Hannah Bat Shahar (born 1944), Israeli writer
- Hannah Battersby (c. 1836–1889), American sideshow performer
- Hannah Beachler (born 1970), American production designer
- Hannah Beard (born 1988), English footballer
- Hannah Beazley (born 1979), Australian politician
- Hannah Beckerman, English author and journalist
- Hannah Beech, American journalist
- Hannah Bell (born 1969), Canadian politician
- Hannah Benka-Coker (1903–1952), Sierra Leone-born educator
- Hannah Bergstedt (born 1977), Swedish politician
- Hannah Berry, British comics artist and writer
- Hannah Betfort (born 1999), American soccer player
- Hannah Bilka (born 2001), American ice hockey player
- Hannah Billig (1901–1987), English medical doctor
- Hannah Black, British artist
- Hannah Blake (born 2000), English-born New Zealand footballer
- Hannah Blank (born 1930), American author
- Hannah Blilie (born 1981), American musician
- Hannah Blore, Welsh sailor
- Hannah Blundell (born 1994), English professional footballer
- Hannah Blythyn (born 1979), Welsh Labour politician and Member of the Senedd for Delyn
- Hannah Boleyn, British singer songwriter
- Hannah Borden Palmer (1843–1940), American temperance reformer
- Hannah Botha (1923–2007), South African actress
- Hannah Botterman (born 1999), England international rugby union player
- Hannah Mary Bouvier Peterson (1811–1870), American textbook author
- Hannah Bowley (born 1984), Australian basketball player
- Hannah Brackenbury (1795–1873), English philanthropist
- Hannah Brand (1754–1821), English actress, poet and playwright
- Hannah Brandt (born 1993), American ice hockey player
- Hannah Brewer (born 1993), Australian soccer player
- Hannah Brier (born 1998), British sprinter
- Hannah Britland (born 1990), British actress and model
- Hannah Broederlow (born 1988), New Zealand netball player
- Hannah Bromley (born 1986), New Zealand footballer
- Hannah Bronfman (born 1987), American DJ, influencer, and entrepreneur
- Hannah Brown (born 1994), American television personality and model
- Hannah Brown (born 1990), British canoeist
- Hannah Brown Skeele (1829–1901), American painter
- Hannah Brückner (born 1958), American sociologist
- Hannah Buckley, New Zealand ecologist
- Hannah Buckling (born 1992), Australian water polo center back
- Hannah Burchell (born 1995), Australian rules footballer
- Hannah Burdon (1800–1877), English novelist
- Hannah de Burgh Whyte (born 1991), Irish cricketer
- Hannah Burke (born 1988), English golfer
- Hannah Burkhill (born 2000), Australian synchronized swimmer
- Hannah Button (born 1996), Australian rules footballer
- Hannah L. Buxbaum, American academic administrator
- Hannah Cain (born 1999), Wales international footballer
- Hannah Cairo (born 2007), American mathematician
- Hannah Callowhill Penn (1671–1727), second wife of William Penn
- Hannah Calvert (born 1997), South African water polo player
- Hannah Campbell-Pegg (born 1982), Australian luger
- Hannah Casey (born 1988), Irish rugby union player
- Hannah Chadwick, American Paralympic cyclist
- Hannah Chaplin (1865–1928), English actress, singer and dancer
- Hannah Chapman Backhouse (1787–1850), English diarist and Quaker minister
- Hannah Cheesman (born 1984), Canadian actress and filmmaker
- Hannah B. Chickering (1817–1879), American prison reformer
- Hannah Chukwu (born 2003), Hungarian squash player
- Hannah Cifers (born 1992), American mixed martial arts fighter
- Hannah Claesson (born 1991), Swedish footballer
- Hannah Keziah Clapp (1824–1908), American teacher and activist
- Hannah Clark (born 1990), English cricketer
- Hannah Clarke (1988–2020), Australian sportsperson and murder victim
- Hannah Claus (born 1969), indigenous Canadian visual artist
- Hannah Claydon (born 1986), English glamour model
- Hannah Clayson Smith, American lawyer
- Hannah Cloke, British hydrologist
- Hannah Clothier Hull (1872–1958), American club woman, feminist and pacifist
- Hannah Clover (born 2002), Canadian Wikipedia editor
- Hannah Clowes (born 1991), British artistic gymnast
- Hannah Cobb, archaeologist
- Hannah Cockroft (born 1992), British wheelchair racer
- Hannah Cohen, several people
- Hannah Cohoon (1788–1864), American painter
- Hannah Collin (born 1982), English tennis player
- Hannah Collins, British contemporary artist and filmmaker
- Hannah Conda, drag performer
- Hannah Cooper (born 1979), Liberian hurdler
- Hannah Lee Corbin (1728–1782), American planter and feminist
- Hannah Cotter (born 2003), New Zealand field hockey player
- Hannah Cotton, Israeli classics professor and historian
- Hannah Cowley, multiple people
- Hannah Crafts, American writer and escaped slave
- Hannah Craig (born 1983), Irish canoe slalom racer
- Hannah Critchlow (born 1980), British scientist, writer and broadcaster
- Hannah Crosbie (born 1997), Scottish wine critic
- Hannah Cross, several people
- Hannah Cullum-Sanders (born 2003), Australian field hockey player
- Hannah Cullwick (1833–1909), English diarist
- Hannah Cunliffe (born 1996), American athlete
- Hannah Tracy Cutler (1815–1896), American journalist
- Hannah Dadds (1941–2011), British train driver
- Hannah Dagoe, Irish 18th century thief
- Hannah Daniel (born 1986), Welsh actress
- Hannah Darlington (born 2002), Australian cricketer
- Hannah M. Darlington (1808–1890), American activist
- Hannah Davis, several people
- Hannah Davison (born 1997), American professional basketball player
- Hannah Dederick (born 2002), American Paralympic athlete
- Hannah Dee, British computer scientist
- Hannah Devlin, English author
- Hannah Diamond (born 1991), British singer, songwriter, photographer and visual artist
- Hannah Diamond (netball) (born 2003), English netball player
- Hannah Diaz (born 1996), American soccer player
- Hannah Dines (born 1993), British T2 trike rider
- Hannah Dingley (born 1983), Welsh football coach
- Hannah Dodd (Paralympian) (born 1992), Australian equestrian Paralympic
- Hannah Dodd (born 1995), English actress
- Hannah P. Dodge (1821–1896), American educator
- Hannah Drake, American poet and activist
- Hannah Dreier, American journalist
- Hannah Dreissigacker (born 1986), American biathlete
- Hannah Drewett (born 1992), English triathlete
- Hannah Dudley (1862–1931), Australian Methodist mission sister
- Hannah Dunn (born 1991), Australian rules footballer
- Hannah Dunne (born 1990), American actress
- Hannah Duston (1657–c. 1736), Indian fighter
- Hannah Einbinder (born 1995), American comedian and actress
- Hannah Bachman Einstein (1862–1929), American child welfare activist
- Hannah Elfner (born 1982), German physicist
- Hannah Elias (born c. 1865), American businesswoman
- Hannah Elizabeth (born 1990), English model and television personality
- Hannah Ellis, American singer-songwriter
- Hannah Elsy (born 1986), British rower
- Hannah Endicott-Douglas (born 1994), Canadian actress
- Hannah England (born 1987), British middle-distance running athlete
- Hannah Ertel (born 1978), German judoka
- Hannah Espia (born 1987), Filipino director
- Hannah Eteson, English librarian
- Hannah Eurlings (born 2003), Belgian footballer
- Hannah Éva (born 1993), American model, artist and Internet personality
- Hannah Every-Hall (born 1977), Australian rower
- Hannah Ewings (born 2004), Australian rules footballer
- Hannah Thurber Fairfield (1808–1894), American portrait painter
- Hannah Dakota Fanning (born 1994), American actress, known as Dakota Fanning
- Hannah Tobey Farmer (1823–1891), American philanthropist, writer, and social reformer
- Hannah Ferguson (born 1992), American model
- Hannah Ferguson (commentator) (born 1998), Australian political commentator
- Hannah Fidell (born 1985), American film director, producer and screenwriter
- Hannah Fielding, Egyptian writer
- Hannah Fierman (born 1987), British-American actress
- Hannah Firmin (born 1956), English illustrator and printmaker
- Hannah Fleming (born 1991), Scottish curler
- Hannah Flippen (born 1995), American softball player
- Hannah Forster (born 1991), English footballer
- Hannah Forster (activist), Gambian human rights activist
- Hannah Foster, several people
- Hannah Jane Fox (born 1976), British actress
- Hannah Fox (born 1969), American boxer
- Hannah Frank (1908–2008), British artist
- Hannah Franklin, Canadian sculptor and painter
- Hannah Freeman (1731–1802), Lenape indigenous healer, artisan and farmer
- Hannah French, English field hockey player
- Hannah Friedman, American writer, director, and musician
- Hannah Fry (born 1984), British mathematician
- Hannah Fury, American singer-songwriter
- Hannah Gablać (born 1995), German field hockey player
- Hannah Gadsby (born 1978), Australian comedian
- Hannah Gale (1876–1970), British-born Canadian politician
- Hannah Gavron (1936–1965), Palestine-born British sociologist
- Hannah Geffert, American politician
- Hannah Georgas (born 1983), Canadian musician
- Hannah Gill (born 1999), Barbadian swimmer
- Hannah Ginsborg, American academic
- Hannah Gladden (born 1996), American wrestler
- Hannah Glasse (1708–1770), English cookbook writer
- Hannah Godwin (born 1995), American television personality, model and YouTuber
- Hannah Godfrey (born 1997), English footballer
- Hannah Gold, British children's author
- Hannah Goldy (born 1992), American mixed martial arts fighter
- Hannah Gonzalez (born 1990), Colombian model
- Hannah Goodlad, Scottish politician
- H. B. Goodwin (1827–1893), American novelist
- Hannah Gordon (born 1941), Scottish actress
- Hannah Flagg Gould (1789–1864), American poet
- Hannah Graaf (born 1978), Swedish glamour model and singer
- Hannah Grace (born 1993), Welsh musical artist
- Hannah Grae, musical artist
- Hannah Graf, British army officer and transgender rights activist
- H. Isabel Graham (1869–1941), Canadian poet
- Hannah Simpson Grant (1798–1883), mother of president Ulysses S. Grant
- Hannah Gravenall (born 1988), New Zealand field hockey player
- Hannah Green, several people
- Hannah Greenwood (born 1987), Australian actress
- Hannah Greg (1766–1828), wife of British businessman
- Hannah Grier Coome (1837–1921), Canadian religious sister
- Hannah Griffitts (1727–1817), American poet
- Hannah Gross (born 1992), Canadian actress
- Hannah Hampton (born 2000), English professional footballer
- Hannah Nokes (1898–1972), American transgender pioneer
- Hannah Hanson Kinney, American seamstress
- Hannah Hardaway (born 1978), American freestyle skier
- Hannah Hart (born 1986), American internet personality, comedian, actress and author
- Hannah E. Hashkes, Israeli philosopher
- Hannah Haughn (born 1994), Canadian field hockey player
- Hannah Hauxwell (1926–2018), Yorkshire Dales farmer
- Hannah Heaton (1721–1794), American diarist and farmer
- Hannah Herzsprung (born 1981), German actress
- Hannah Hicks (born 1991), British table tennis player
- Hannah Hidalgo (born 2005), American basketball player
- Hannah Higgins (born 1964), American historian
- Hannah Hobley (born 1988), English actress and singer
- Hannah Höch (1889–1978), German Dada artist
- Hannah Hodson (born 1991), American actress, journalist
- Hannah Hoekstra (born 1987), Dutch actress
- Hannah Hofman (born 1981), Dutch cricketer
- Hannah Holgersson (born 1976), Swedish operatic soprano
- Hannah Holman (born 1991), American model
- Hannah Holmes (born 1963), American writer, journalist, essayist and science commentator
- Hannah Howell, American novelist
- Hannah Clothier Hull (1872–1958), American clubwoman, feminist, and pacifist
- Hannah Humphrey (1745–1818), English print seller
- Hannah Hurnard (1905–1990), English-Israeli Christian author
- Hannah Ild (born 1981), Estonian singer
- Hannah Ireland (born 1995), New Zealand artist
- Hannah Irwin (born 1998), Northern Irish athlete
- Hannah Jackson, slave of US President Jackson and his wife Rachel
- Hannah Jacobs, British illustrator and animator
- Hannah Jadagu (born 1994), American pop musician
- Hannah James, several people
- Hannah Jenkins Barnard (1754–1825), Quaker minister
- Hannah Tempest Jenkins (1854–1927), American painter
- Hannah Jeter (born 1990), American model and television host
- Hannah John-Kamen (born 1989), English actress
- Hannah Johnson, several people
- Hannah Jones, several people
- Hannah Josephson (1900–1976), American historian
- Hannah Joyce, Australian scientist and engineer
- Hannah Judkins Starbird (1832–1922), American army nurse
- Hannah Jumper (1781–1865), American temperance activist
- Hannah Kahn (1911–1988), American poet
- Hannah Kallem (1865–1937), Norwegian-born American army nurse
- Hannah Kaminski (born 1994), Canadian weightlifter
- Hannah Kane, Massachusetts politician
- Hannah Karminski (1897–1943), German educator
- Hannah Kasulka (born 1988), American actress
- Hannah Keane (born 1993), American soccer player
- Hannah Kearney (born 1986), American mogul skier
- Hannah Kempfer (1880–1943), Minnesota schoolteacher and politician
- Hannah Kendall, British composer
- Hannah Kent Schoff (1853–1940), American social worker and reformer
- Hannah Kent (born 1985), Australian writer
- Hannah Kerr (born 1997), American Christian musician
- Hannah Keryakoplis (born 1994), Welsh footballer
- Hannah Kigusiuq (1931–1995), Inuk artist
- Hannah Kilham (1774–1832), Methodist and Quaker missionary
- Hannah Kim (born 1957), Israeli journalist
- Hannah King (born 2004), rugby player
- Hannah T. King (1808–1886), British-American writer, pioneer
- Hannah Klugman (born 2009), British professional tennis player
- Hannah Kousheh (born 1997), Jordanian footballer
- Hannah Krüger (born 1988), German field hockey player
- Hannah Kudjoe (1918–1986), Ghanaian activist
- Hannah Laing, Scottish DJ and record producer
- Hannah Lamdan (1905–1995), Israeli politician
- Hannah Landecker, American sociologist
- Hannah Landheer (born 2002), Dutch cricketer
- Hannah Love Lanier (born 2008), American actress
- Hannah Lavery (born 1977), Scottish writer, poet and performer
- Hannah Lawrance (1795–1875), English historian and journalist
- Hannah Lawrence Schieffelin (1758–1838), American political poet
- Hannah Leder (born 1986), American actress
- Hannah Lee (born 2000), Nicaraguan footballer
- Hannah Farnham Sawyer Lee (1780–1865), American novelist
- Hannah Harrison Ludwell Lee (1701–1750), American colonial heiress
- Hannah Levien, Australian actress and writer
- Hannah Levy, American sculptor
- Hannah Lewi, Australian architectural historian and educator
- Hannah Lewis (born 1984), Australian basketball player
- Hannah Lightfoot, English Quaker
- Hannah Lim (born 2004), Canadian South Korean ice dancer
- Hannah Little (born 2001), Irish cricketer
- Hannah Lloyd (born 1979), Welsh cricketer
- Hannah Lochner (born 1993), Canadian actress
- Hannah Logasa (1878–1967), American librarian
- Hannah Longshore (1819–1901), American physician
- Hannah Lopez (born 1992), American football player
- Hannah Lowe (born 1976), British writer
- Hannah Lowther (born 1997), English actress
- Hannah Luce (born 1989), American plane crash survivor and daughter of Ron Luce
- Hannah Ludwig (born 2000), German cyclist
- Hannah Lyman (1816–1871), American educator, biographer
- Hannah Lynch (1859–1904), Irish novelist and journalist
- Hannah Lyons Johnson, American journalist
- Hannah Macdougall (born 1987), Australian Paralympic swimmer
- Hannah MacGoun, Scottish artist
- Hannah Macleod (born 1984), English field hockey player
- Hannah Mancini (born 1980), American-Slovenian singer
- Hannah Marks (born 1993), American actress, writer
- Hannah Markwig (born 1980), German mathematician
- Hannah Marshall, several people
- Hannah Marshman (1767–1847), British missionary
- Hannah Martin, several people
- Hannah Matthews (born 1991), Ireland women's hockey international
- Hannah Maybank (born 1974), British artist
- Hannah Mayho (born 1990), English cyclist
- Hannah Maynard Pickard (1812–1844), American novelist
- Hannah Maynard (1834–1918), Canadian photographer
- Hannah M. McCarthy, American academic
- Hannah McFadden (born 1996), American Paralympic athlete
- Hannah McGlade (born 1969), Australian lawyer, academic and human rights advocate
- Hannah McGowan (born 1992), American ice hockey player
- Hannah McKeand (born 1973), British explorer
- Hannah McKibbin (born 1985), British rhythmic gymnast
- Hannah McLean (born 1981), New Zealand swimmer
- Hannah McLeod (1857–1912), Australian hospital matron
- Hannah McLoughlin (born 1999), Irish field hockey player
- Hannah Mermaid (born 1974), underwater performance artist and marine conservation activist
- Hannah Meul (born 2001), German rock climber
- Hannah Midgley (born 1993), English actress
- Hannah Miles (born 1998), Welsh footballer
- Hannah Miley (born 1989), Scottish swimmer
- Hannah Milhous Nixon (1885–1967), mother of U.S. president Richard Nixon
- Hannah Miller (born 1996), American figure skater
- Hannah Miller (ice hockey) (born 1996), Canadian ice hockey player
- Hannah Mills (born 1988), British competitive sailor
- Hannah Mitchell (1872–1956), English suffragette and socialist
- Hannah Moffat, British journalist
- Hannah Momoh, former First Lady of Sierra Leone
- Hannah Moncur (born 2004), Scottish actress
- Hannah Monson (born 1992), Australian actress
- Hannah Monyer (born 1957), German biologist
- Hannah Moore (born 1996), American swimmer
- Hannah More (1745–1833), English religious writer and philanthropist
- Hannah Morris, American anthropologist
- Hannah Moscovitch (born 1978), Canadian playwright
- Hannah Moskowitz (born 1991), American young adult and middle grade author
- Hannah Motler (born 2001), British fashion model
- Hannah Mouncey (born 1989), Australian handball player
- Hannah Moylan (1867–1902), first Irish woman to gain a bachelor's degree in science
- Hannah Müller (born 2000), Swiss canoeist
- Hannah Munyard (born 2001), Australian rules footballer
- Hannah Murray (born 1989), English actress
- Hannah Myrick (1871–1973), American physician
- Hannah Neise (born 2000), German skeleton racer
- Hannah Németh (born 1998), Hungarian footballer
- Hannah Neumann (born 1984), German politician
- Hannah New (born 1984), English actress
- Hannah Newhouse (born 1997), American professional stock car racing driver and reporter
- Hannah Nielsen, Australian lacrosse player
- Hannah Norsa (c. 1712–1784), English Jewish actress and singer
- Hannah Northcote (c. 1761–1831), British artist
- Hannah Nuttall (born 1997), British athlete
- Hannah Ama Nyarko (born 1964), Ghana politician
- Hannah Nydahl (1946–2007), Danish Buddhist teacher
- Hannah O'Brien Chaplin (1809–1865), American biblical scholar
- Hannah Ocuish (1774–1786), 12-year old Pequot Native American girl who was hanged for murder
- Hannah Ojo Ajakaiye, Nigerian journalist
- Hannah Okwengu, Kenyan judge
- Hannah Olson, American documentary director and producer
- Hannah Onslow (born 1998), English actress
- Hannah Osborne (born 1994), New Zealand rower
- Hannah Sanghee Park (born 1986), American poet
- Hannah J. Patterson (1879–1937), American suffragist and social activist
- Hannah Paynter (born 1997), American rower
- Hannah Payton (born 1994), British cyclist
- Hannah Pearce (born 1998), South African field hockey player
- Hannah Peel (born 1984), Northern Irish musician
- Hannah Pennington, American para-alpine skier
- Hannah Perry (born 1984), British artist
- Hannah Petty (born 1997), Australian netball player
- Hannah Pfalzgraf (born 1997), Swiss politician
- Hannah Pick-Goslar (1928–2022), close friend of Anne Frank and Holocaust survivor
- Hannah Maynard Pickard (1812–1844), American school teacher, preceptress, author
- Hannah Pingree (born 1976), majority leader and Speaker of the House in the Maine House of Representatives
- Hannah Elizabeth Pipe (1831–1906), British headmistress
- Hannah Pittard, American novelist
- Hannah D. Pittman, American journalist
- Hannah Cope Plimpton (1841–1929), American educator and relief worker
- Hannah Poland (1873–1942), English bird conservationist
- Hannah Pool, British-Eritrean writer and journalist
- Hannah Porter (born 1979), New Zealand rugby union player
- Hannah Priest (born 1992), Australian rules footballer
- Hannah Primrose (1851–1890), Countess of Rosebery
- Hannah Pritchard (1711–1768), English actress
- Hannah Prock (born 2000), Austrian luger
- Hannah Quinlivan (born 1993), Taiwanese actress and model
- Hannah Quinn-Mulligan (born 1990), Irish journalist
- Hannah Rae (born 1997), English actress
- Hannah Rainey (born 1997), Scottish cricketer
- Hannah Rankin (born 1990), British boxer
- Hannah Rarity, Scottish musical artist
- Hannah Reid (born 1989), English singer of London Grammar
- Hannah Emily Reid (1870–1955), Canadian doctor
- Hannah Reji Koshy, Indian actress and model
- Hannah Reuben (born 1994), Nigerian wrestler and soldier
- Hannah Reyes Morales, Filipina photographer
- Hannah Reynolds (soccer) (born 1998), American soccer player
- Hannah Rickards, British artist
- Hannah Riddell (1855–1932), English missionary and Japanese leper hospital administrator
- Hannah Rigby (c.1794–1853), Australian convict
- Hannah Ritchie, Scottish data scientist and researcher
- Hannah Roberson-Mytilinaiou (born 1967), Greek equestrian
- Hannah Roberts, several people
- Hannah Robertson, several people
- Hannah Robinson, British songwriter
- Hannah Robison (born 1994), American beauty pageant titleholder
- Hannah Rogers (born 1991), American softball player
- Hannah Ropes (1809–1863), American nurse, abolitionist and writer
- Hannah Rose (born 1995), American pop musician
- Hannah Rosenbloom (born 2001), musical artist
- Hannah Rosenthal, American diplomat
- Hannah Ross (born 1990), American cyclist
- Hannah Rueben (born 1994), Nigerian wrestler
- Hannah Russell (born 1996), British Paralympic swimmer
- Hannah Ryggen (1894–1970), Norwegian artist
- Hannah Safran, Israeli feminist
- Hannah V. Sawyerr, Sierra Leonean-American poet and young adult novelist
- Hannah Schaefer (born 1996), American Christian musician
- Hannah Schmidt (born 1994), Canadian freestyle skier
- Hannah Schmitz (born 1985), British engineer
- Hannah Schneider (born 1982), Danish musician and composer
- Hannah Scott, several people
- Hannah Seabert (born 1995), American soccer player
- Hannah Sell (born 1971), British Marxist political activist
- Hannah Semer (1925–2003), Israeli journalist
- Hannah Sen (1894–1957), Indian educator, politician and feminist
- Hannah Shaw, several people
- Hannah Louise Shearer (born 1945), American television writer
- Hannah Shields, Irish athlete and mountaineer
- Hannah Silcock (born 2004), English footballer
- Hannah Silverman (born 1999), American acrobatic gymnast
- Hannah Simone (born 1980), Canadian actress, television host, and model
- Hannah Sjerven (born 1998), American basketball player
- Hannah Slater (1774–1812), early American pioneer and inventor
- Hannah Ann Sluss (born 1996), American television personality
- Hannah Small (1903–1992), American sculptor
- Hannah Smith, several people
- Hannah Snell (1723–1792), British woman who disguised herself as a man and became a soldier
- Hannah Snellgrove (born 1990), British Olympic sailor
- Hannah Soar (born 1999), American freestyle skier
- Hannah G. Solomon (1858–1942), American social reformer
- Hannah Song, American activist
- Hannah Sorensen, Danish midwife
- Hannah Southwell (born 1999), Australia international rugby league and rugby union footballer, and association footballer
- Hannah Spearritt (born 1981), English singer and actress
- Hannah Spencer (born 1991), British politician
- Hannah Kihalani Springer, Hawaiian environmental and educator
- Hannah Stambaugh (born 1998), Japanese footballer
- Hannah Stanton (1913–1993), English social worker and anti-apartheid activist
- Hannah Starkey (born 1971), British photographer
- Hannah Starling (born 1995), British former diver
- Hannah Steele Pettit (1886–1961), American astronomer
- Hannah Steele, British actress
- Hannah Steinberg (1926–2019), Austrian-born British pioneer of experimental psychopharmacology
- Hannah Stevens (born 1995), American swimmer
- Hannah Holliday Stewart (1924–2010), American sculptor
- Hannah Stitfall, British TV presenter
- Hannah Stockbauer (born 1982), German swimmer
- Hannah Stocking (born 1992), American internet personality, comedian, model and actress
- Hannah Stodel (born 1985), British Paralympic sailor
- Hannah Stone, Welsh harpist
- Hannah Storm (born 1962), American co-host of The Early Show
- Hannah Stouffer, American artist, illustrator and art director
- Hannah Stuelke (born c. 2004), American basketball player
- Hannah Sullivan (born 1979), British academic and poet
- Hannah Bluma Sultz, Lithuanian Hebrew poet
- Hannah Swarton (1651–1708), New England colonial pioneer
- Hannah Sylvester (1903–1973), American singer
- Hannah Szenes (1921–1944), Hungarian Jew arrested during the Second World War
- Hannah Tamaki, vision New Zealand Party candidate in the 2020 and 2023 New Zealand general election
- Hannah Tan (born 1981), Malaysian singer-songwriter
- Hannah Tapp (born 1995), American volleyball player
- Hannah Taunton (born 1991), British Paralympic athlete
- Hannah E. Taylor (1835–?), American poet
- Hannah Taylor (born 1998), Canadian freestyle wrestler
- Hannah Taylor-Gordon (born 1987) English actress, Anne Frank: The Whole Story
- Hannah Teter (born 1987), American snowboarder
- Hannah Thompson, British scholar
- Hannah Cassels im Thurn (1854–1947), British sculptor
- Hannah Tinti (born 1973), American writer and editor
- Hannah Tompkins (1781–1829), Second Lady of the United States
- Hannah Tompkins (1920–1995), American artist
- Hannah Tointon (born 1987), British actress
- Hannah Traylen (born 1995), English actress
- Hannah Trigger (born 1987), Australian snowboarder
- Hannah Trigwell (born 1990), English musical artist
- Hannah Turpin, American curator
- Hannah Twynnoy (1669/70–1703), first British person killed by a tiger
- Hannah Tyler Wilcox (1838–1909), American physician
- Hannah Tyrrell (born 1990), Irish rugby player
- Hannah Uzor, British-Zambian painter
- Hannah Valantine, professor of cardiovascular medicine
- Hannah Van Buren (1783–1819), wife of US president, Martin Van Buren
- Hannah van der Westhuysen (born 1995), British actress
- Hannah van Kampen (born 1993), New Zealand cyclist
- Hannah Vermeersch (born 1992), Australian rower
- Hannah Vester (born 2006), German rhythmic gymnast
- Hannah Viller Møller (born 2001), Danish tennis player
- Hannah Vogt (1910–1994), German historian
- Hannah Vuljak (born 2002), Croatian handball player
- Hannah Waddingham (born 1974), English actress
- Hannah Wall (born 1991), New Zealand footballer
- Hannah Wallett (born 1990), Australian rules footballer
- Hannah Walters, English actress and producer
- Hannah Wants (born 1986), British DJ and producer
- Hannah Ward Barron (1829–1898), New Zealand businesswoman and hotel proprietor
- Hannah Ware (born 1982), English actress
- Hannah Waterman (born 1975), English actress
- Hannah Webster Foster (1758–1840), American novelist
- Hannah Weiland (born 1990), English fashion designer
- Hannah Weiner (1928–1997), American poet
- Hannah Weinstein (1911–1984), American-British television producer
- Hannah Welton (born 1990), American drummer
- Hannah L. Wessling (1873–1960), American chemist
- Hannah Weyer, American filmmaker and writer
- Hannah Whelan (born 1992), British gymnast
- Hannah Widell (born 1975), Swedish television presenter and media-personality
- Hannah Wilke (1940–1993), American painter, sculptor and photographer
- Hannah Wilkinson (born 1992), New Zealand footballer
- Hannah Williams, several people
- Hannah Wilson (born 1989), Hong Kong swimmer
- Hannah Wilson (chess player) (born 2009), Barbadian chess player
- Hannah Winbolt, 19th and 20th century English suffragist
- Hannah Winkler (born 1985), South African politician
- Hannah Witton (born 1992), English YouTuber and writer
- Hannah Wood, several people
- H. Rea Woodman (1870–1951), American writer and educator
- Hannah Woolley (c. 1622–in or after 1675), English writer
- Hannah Marie Wormington (1914–1994), American archaeologist
- Hannah Amelia Wright (1836–1924), American physician
- Hannah Yakin (born 1933), Israeli artist
- Hannah P. Yang, American cancer epidemiologist
- Hannah Yelland, British actress
- Hannah Yeoh (born 1979), Malaysian politician and lawyer
- Hannah (born 1978), Australian pop singer

=== Biblical figures ===
- Hannah (biblical figure), the mother of Samuel from the Books of Samuel
- Saint Anne, mother of Mary, mother of Jesus
- Woman with seven sons, an unnamed Jewish martyr in 2 Maccabees, usually given the name Hannah
- Anna the Prophetess, a prophetess in the Gospel of Luke, spelled Hannah in some translations

=== Fictional characters ===
- Hannah Ashworth, in the English soap opera Hollyoaks
- Hannah Baker, protagonist in both the novel and Netflix series 13 Reasons Why
- Hannah Baxter, semi-fictional character and protagonist of the British television series Secret Diary of a Call Girl
- Hannah McKay, in the TV series Dexter
- Hannah Martin, in the Australian soap opera Neighbours
- Hannah Montana, alter ego of Miley Cyrus' character Miley Stewart in the Hannah Montana
- Hannah Osborne (Hollyoaks), in the British soap opera
- Hannah Wilson, in the Australian soap opera Home and Away
- Hannah, a character in the film 28 Days Later
- Hannah, in the film Arrival
- Hannah, in the TV series Chuck
- Hannah, in the film Crazy, Stupid, Love
- Hannah, the character in both film versions of Hannah (2017 film) and Hannah (1997 film)
- Hannah, the titular character of Hannah and Her Sisters
- Hannah, in the film Made of Honor
- Hannah Abbott, a character in the Harry Potter series
- Hannah Asher, in the medical drama Chicago Med
- Hannah Bankole, a character in The Handmaid's Tale
- Hannah Diamond, the main protagonist of the children's book series Hannah, by Mindy Skolsky
- Hannah Fairchild, the main protagonist in Goosebumps: The Ghost Next Door and Goosebumps (film)
- Hannah Ferguson, a character in the Spitfire Grill
- Hannah Fleishman, in the book Fleishman Is in Trouble and the TV adaptation
- Hannah Grosse, in The Haunting of Bly Manor
- Hannah Kahnwald, in the German series Dark
- Hannah Phillips, in the 1995 animated film Toy Story
- Hannah Stone, protagonist of video games Wanted: Dead
- Hannah Swanson, in the anime series Glitter Force
- Hannah Wells, in American Horror Story: NYC
- Hanna, a character in the 2001 film Un amor en Moisés Ville
- Hannah Whitehouse (also known as Honoka Yukishiro), co-protagonist of the Toei anime Futari wa Pretty Cure

== See also ==
- Anna (given name)
- Ana (given name)
- Hanna (surname)
- Johanna
