= Indiscretion =

Indiscretion may refer to:

== Books and plays ==
- Indiscretion (play), an 1800 comedy by Prince Hoare
- Indiscretions, English-language version of the 1938 play Les Parents terribles
- Indiscretion, a 1990 novel by Anne Mather
- Indiscretion, a 2000 novel by Jillian Hunter
- Indiscretion, a 2015 novel by Hannah Fielding
- Indiscretions, a 1995 novel by Robyn Donald
- The Indiscretion, a 2001 novel by Judith Ivory

== Film and TV ==
- Indiscretion (2016 film), an American psychological thriller film
- Indiscretion (1917 film), an American silent drama film
- "Indiscretion" (Star Trek: Deep Space Nine), a 1995 episode of Star Trek: Deep Space Nine

== Music ==
- Indiscretion, a 1959 album by Patti Page
- "Indiscretion", a 1983 song by Bill Nelson
