= Skolski =

Skolski may refer to:

- Powiat skolski, a former powiat (district) in the Stanisławów Voivodeship, Second Polish Republic
- Skole Raion (Polish: Rejon skolski, Ukrainian: Сколівський район), a former raion (district) in Lviv Oblast, Ukraine
- Skolsky (surname)
