= Skolsky (surname) =

Skolsky, Skolskiy (Russian: Скольский), or Skolski (Polish: Skolski) is a Slavic masculine surname; its feminine counterpart is Skolska or Skolskaya. People with the name include:

- Mindy Skolsky, American writer
- Sergey Skolskiy (born 1995), Russian powerlifter
- Sidney Skolsky (1905–1983), American writer and gossip columnist
- Steffi Sidney (born Stephanie Skolsky; 1935–2010), American actress, daughter of Sidney

== See also ==
- Skolski (disambiguation)
