= Hannah Robertson =

Hannah Robertson may refer to:

- Hannah Robertson (autobiographer) (1724?-1800?), Scottish autobiographical and instructional writer
- Hannah Robertson (educationist) (1862–1950), British educationist

== See also ==
- Hannah Roberson-Mytilinaiou (born 1967), Greek equestrian
