= Hannah Johnson =

Hannah Johnson may refer to:

- Hannah Johnson Carter, American educator
- Hannah Johnson Howell, American librarian
- Hannah Johnson (soccer), American soccer player
