= Hannah Williams =

Hannah Williams may refer to:

- Hannah Williams (actress) (1911–1973), American actress, singer, and comedian
- Hannah Williams (athlete) (born 1998), British athlete
- Hannah Williams (murder victim) (1987–2001), British murder victim
- Hannah Williams (football), coach for Sierra Leone women's national football team
- Hannah English Williams, collector of natural history in the American British Colonies
- Hannah Williams, Milkshake! presenter
- Hannah Williams, Miss Wales, 2017 finalist
