= Hannah Cohen =

Hannah Cohen is the name of:

- Hannah Cohen (singer) (born 1986), American singer and model
- Hannah Cohen (philanthropist) (1875–1946), English civil servant and philanthropist
