= Hannah Cross =

Hannah Cross may refer to:

- Hannah Cross (barrister) (1908–2008), English barrister
- Hannah Cross (synchronised swimmer) (born 1997), Australian synchronised swimmer
