= Charles Cushing Wright =

American engraver and medalist (1796–1857)

Charles Cushing Wright (1 May 1796, in Damariscotta, Maine – 7 June 1857, in New York City) was an American engraver and medalist. In 1825 he was a founding member of the National Academy of Design.

== Art ==
Wright was first apprenticed to a silversmith in Utica, New York, then came to New York City in 1823 and established a partnership with the painter Asher Brown Durand (1796–1886) until 1827, named Durand and Wright, Engravers.

Together with Samuel Morse, Durand and others, Wright was one of the "First Fifteen" founders of the National Academy of Design in 1825.

Charles Cushing Wright has been called "The First American Medalist". He both designed and cut his medals 17 of which are currently in the permanent collection of the Metropolitan Museum of Art.

== Personal life ==
On Sept 18, 1820 Wright married Lavinia Dorothy Simons (her tombstone 1805–1869), a Huguenot from Charleston, South Carolina and a direct descendant of the second settlers of that city. He was the father of the notable physician Hannah Amelia Wright.
