= Hannah Ojo Ajakaiye =

Nigerian journalist

- Born: Nigeria
- Education: Obafemi Awolowo University
- Occupations: Journalist, Fact-checker
- Employer: The Nation (formerly)
- Known for: Science journalism; ICFJ TruthBuzz Fellowship
- Awards: Nigerian Academy of Science Media Award (2017)

Hannah Ojo Ajakaiye is a Nigerian journalist. She won the Nigerian Academy of Science's media award as the Print Science Journalist of the year 2017.

== Biography ==
Ojo graduated from the Obafemi Awolowo University, Ile-Ife, Nigeria.

In 2016, Ojo won the Prize for Most Innovative Reporting at the Nigerian Media Merit Award (NMMA) in Lagos.

She won the Nigerian Academy of Science Media Awards as the Print Science Journalist of the year 2017. She also received the Newscorp Fellowship. She is a recipient of the 2018 Reham Al-Farra (RAF) Journalism Fellowship.

She is an alumnus of the US Department of State Foreign Press Centre's reporting tour on human trafficking. She was recognised as the journalist of the month in October 2018 by the IJNet. Hannah is also a TruthBuzz Fellow of the International Center for Journalists (ICFJ).
