= Hannah Borden Palmer =

American temperance reformer

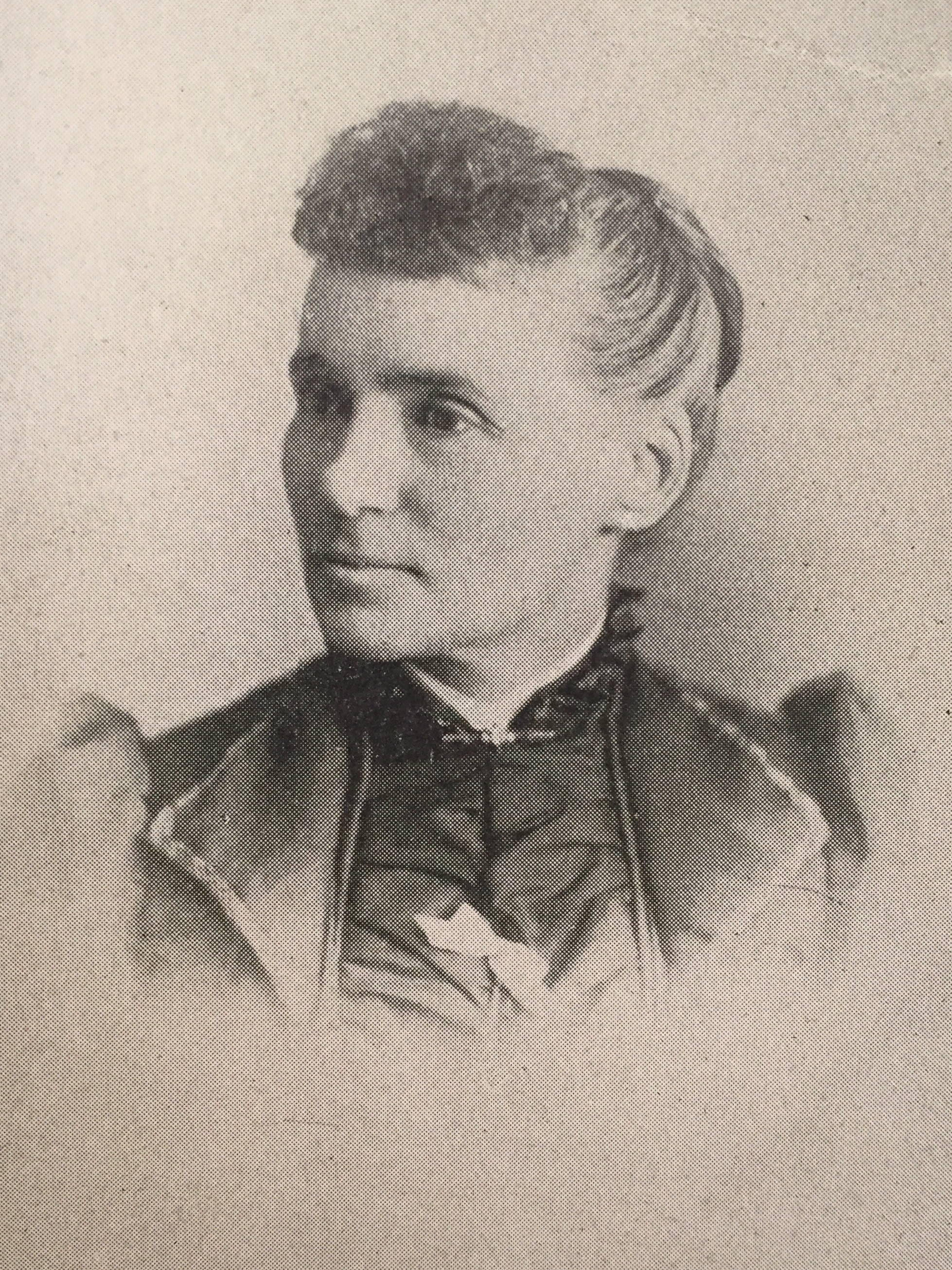
Hannah Borden Palmer

Hannah Borden Palmer (October 8, 1843 - January 26, 1940) was a temperance reformer.

== Early life and family ==
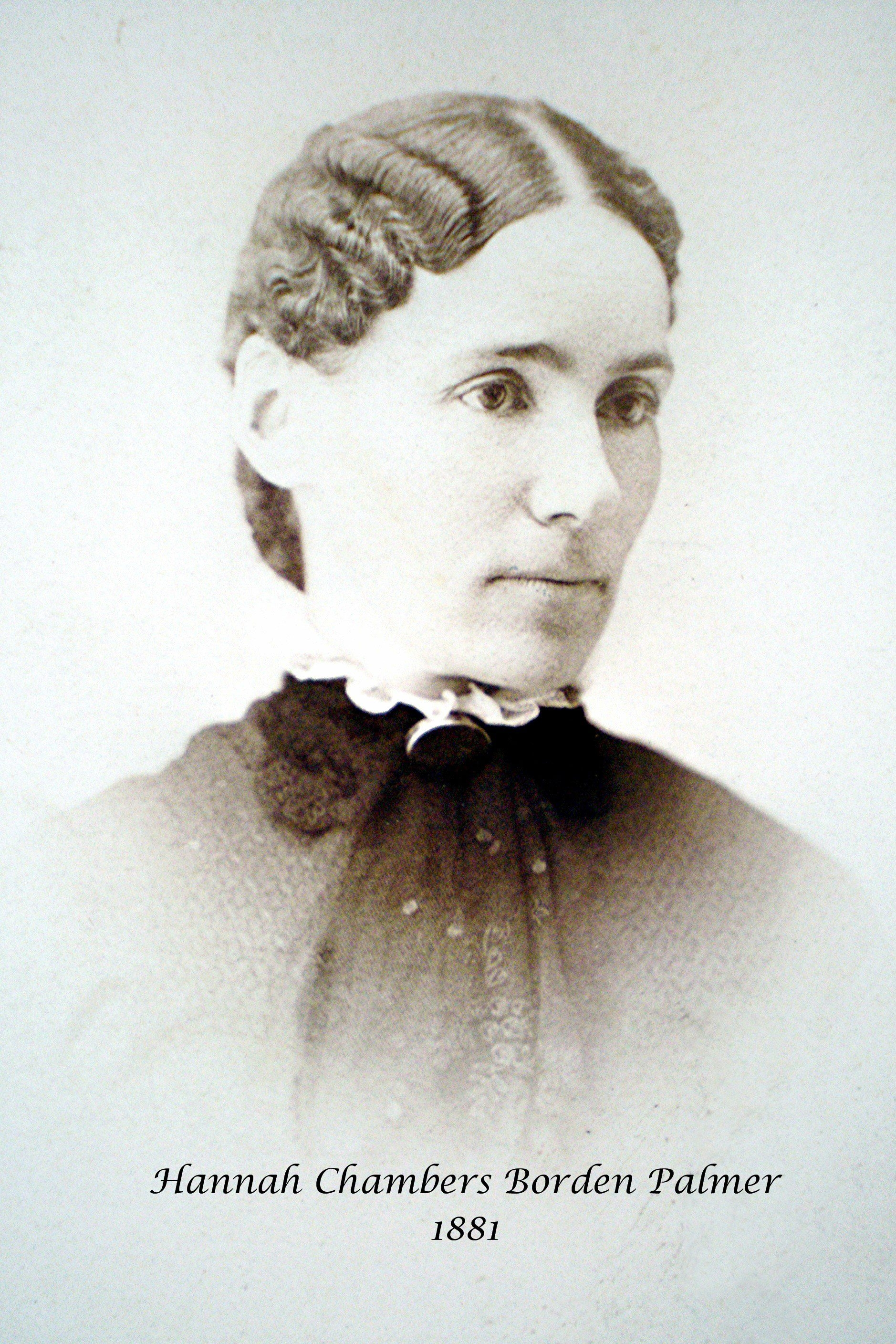
Hannah Borden Palmer

Hannah Chambers Borden was born in Battle Creek, Michigan, on October 8, 1843. Her father was a Presbyterian clergyman, Edmund Woodmansee Borden (1822-1893). On her mother's side, Margaret Hopper (1823-1901), she descended from Andries Willemszen Hoppe (1622-1658), who was among the first settlers of Manhattan Island. She was the oldest of a family of eight children, the four surviving siblings were: Almira C. Rice (1845-1934), Emma L. Borden (1848-1872), Edmund James Borden (1852-1927), Flora E. Exelby (1864-1941).

Edmund Woodmansee Borden was the second son of Tyler and Hannah Borden and was born in Monmouth county, New Jersey, on March 30, 1822. When twenty years old he married Margaret Hopper of New York City and with her moved to Michigan in 1843, at the time a pioneers land. He died on February 27, 1893, after fifty-three years of ministry. He is buried with his wife at Forest Hill Cemetery (Ann Arbor, Michigan).

At the age of sixteen Palmer entered Albion College, in Albion, Michigan, and after a three-year course of study took her master's degree, M. A. 1862.

== Career ==
After graduation Hannah Borden Palmer began to teach in the union school in Lapeer, Michigan.

In 1864 Palmer accompanied her husband to the front with his regiment, camping with them until the muster-out in September 1865. After that home duties and the care of her children occupied her time until the crusade began.

She was elected president of the Woman's Christian Temperance Union, of Dexter, Michigan, under whose guidance and auspices were organized a public library and reading-room.

She opened a private school in Colorado, which she conducted with success until she moved to Buffalo, New York.

Mainly through her efforts, a lodge of Good Templars was organized in Boulder, Colorado, and she was its presiding officer for five successive terms.

Her love for children induced her to organize a Band of Hope, which soon grew to nearly two-hundred members. During that time she became a member of the Woman's Christian Temperance Union of Boulder and soon received the gavel.

In the spring of 1886 business led her husband to Buffalo, in the practice of his profession. Seeing in the Royal Templars what she believed to be a fruitful source of great good, she united with that order, serving as chaplain, vice-councilor and select councilor. After three years as select councilor of Advance Council No. 25 she declined reelection. Her council sent her as its representative to the Grand Council in February 1890. On her first introduction into that body she was made chairman of the committee on temperance work and was elected grand vice-councilor, being the first woman to hold that position in the jurisdiction of New York. In the subsequent sessions of the Grand Council in February 1891, and February 1892, she was reelected grand vice-councilor, being the only person ever reelected to that office.

== Personal life ==
In November 1864, Hannah Borden married Dr. Elmore Palmer (December 16, 1839 - October 23, 1909), son of Layton Palmer, then surgeon of the 29th Michigan Volunteer Infantry Regiment. Dr. Palmer wrote a lengthy series in 1908 and 1909 about Albion History in the Albion Mirror newspaper entitled "Biographical Sketches", which provided valuable information about the early history of Albion. Palmer attended the Albion public school, and the Albion Seminary and Albion College. He graduated from the University of Michigan at Ann Arbor as a medic in 1864. His uncle, Dr. Alonzo B. Palmer was dean of the medical school there.

In 1881, after the death of all four of her children, she moved to Boulder, Colorado, and then in 1886 to Buffalo, New York, always with her husband. They lived at 309 Plymouth Avenue. She spent the last 5 years of her life at the Episcopal Church Home and died from arterial sclerosis on January 26, 1940. She was buried as a pauper at the Forest Lawn Cemetery (Buffalo) with no headstone together with her husband's ashes.
