= Hannah Northcote =

British artist (c. 1761–1831)

- Born: 1761
- Died: 9 September 1831 (aged 69–70)
- Occupation: Silversmith

Hannah Northcote (née Coley) (c. 1761 – 9 September 1831) was an English silversmith.

Northcote was the daughter of bucklemaker Simeon Coley; at his death, on 22 June 1798, she was named among his heirs, along with two sisters and a brother. She married the spoonmaker Thomas Northcote on 12 January 1788; after his death, she became a goldsmith, registering her first mark on 6 June 1798. A second mark followed on 3 December 1799. At on time she lived in Barkley Street, Clerkenwell, but by March 1800 she had moved to 9 Cross Street, Hatton Garden. At her death she was interred in Bunhill Fields, where a monument was raised in her honor.

Numerous pieces by Northcote have survived. A George III teapot stand by her, dated to 1809, is owned by the National Museum of Women in the Arts.
