= Hannah Gonzalez =

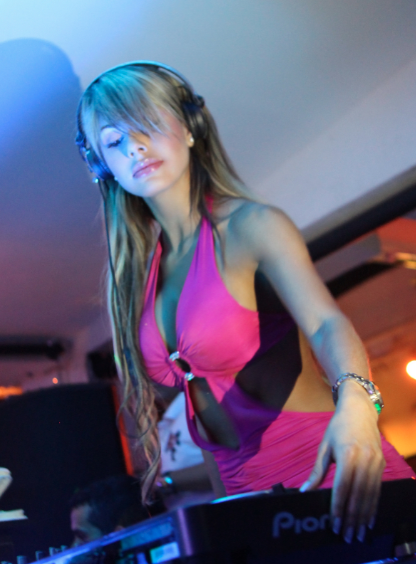
- Hannah González in 2011.

Background information
- Also known as: Deejane Hannah, Liz González, DJ Hannah, Hannah Gonzalez
- Born: 21 November 1990 (age 34); Cali, Colombia
- Genres: Electronic, techno, house, dance, progressive house
- Years active: 2005–present

Hannah Gonzalez (born 21 November 1990, Cali, Colombia), also known by her pseudonym Deejane Hannah, is a Colombian disc jockey of electronic music, musical producer and model.

== Career ==
Hannah Gonzalez was born in Colombia on 21 November 1990. Hannah Gonzalez began her career as a DJ at the age of 15, during which time she adopted the name Liz Gonzalez. During the earlier stages of her career, she focused on musical genres such as vocal house and progressive house. Eventually, she was invited to mix electronic music festivals in many cities throughout Colombia. Once she began to establish herself in the electronic scene of her country, she adapted the pseudonym Deejane Hannah. Since beginning her career, Hannah has experimented with a variety of styles within the house genre, including tribe house, tech house, and afro house.

In the year 2009, she made a series of exclusive sets for the Electroemite radio program of Medellín, a program that frequently features new Colombian talent. In 2013, she released the albums Orgasmic Sessions (which included two volumes), and Elitech (which also had two volumes). This work eventually led her to be invited to appear in Ecuador, Panama, Argentina and Punta Cana in the Dominican Republic, where she shared the stage with British band Franz Ferdinand. After that tour, she was invited to appear with DJ Umek in a show in Medellin.

Further recognition as a DJ was generated on the El Cartel de La Mega program on the Colombian station RCN Radio in June 2011. She finished the year with her eighth production, called Happy Birthday to Me and was invited to represent Colombia in Guatemala together with the official DJ of the Playboy mansion in the U.S., DJ Rihanon.

She launched her musical work Dance or Die at the beginning of 2012, returning to the house style as when she began her career. In addition, she launched her website. In the middle of that year, she played in a rave party organized by Beer Barena in Tegucigalpa, Honduras.

Hannah has toured throughout Latin America, the Caribbean, Europe, Asia, and North America. She has performed a run of shows at Electronic Music's Paradise in Ibiza, Spain and made shows in the Dubai city in the United Arab Emirates. Since settling first in NYC and now residing in Miami, she has played iconic North American venues such as Pacha NYC, Space Miami, Space Ibiza NY, Cielo, Output, Treehouse, Heart Miami, Trade, and many more unique spaces. Hannah's extensive performance career has combined the best of her musical repertoire with the elegance of her staging.

In 2022 Hannah was expected to release an album including some remastered tracks she made throughout her career.

== Awards ==
In December 2012, the newspaper Publimetro México held a public election in its online and print editions to determine who its readers considered Miss Twitter 2012. González was one of the 10 finalists in the first round. In the final round, Hannah González emerged as the winner, beating out her competitors with over 54% of the votes.

== Discography ==
=== Singles ===
- "Hipnotik" (2011)
- "My Roots" (2011)
- "Elixir" (2011)
- "Happy Birthday to Me" (2011)

=== Mixed albums ===
- Orgasmic Vol. 1 (2010)
- Orgasmic Vol. 2 (2010)
- Elitech Vol. 1 (2010)
- Elitech Vol. 2 (2010)
- Dance or Die Vol.1 (2012)
- Dance or Die Vol.2 (2012)
- Partylicious (Radio Show) (2013)
