= Hannah Kahn =

American poet

- Born: June 30, 1911; New York City, New York, United States
- Died: February 1988 (aged 76–77); Miami, Florida, United States
- Occupation: Poet
- Spouse: Frank Kahn
- Children: 2 sons, 1 daughter, Vivian Kahn
- Writing career
- Genre: Poetry
- Notable work: "Ride a Wild Horse"
- Notable awards: International Sonnet Competition (London)

Hannah Kahn (1911–1988) was an American poet, born in New York City, and subsequently a longtime resident of Miami, Florida. She was known especially for her inspirational poem "Ride a Wild Horse."

== Biography ==
Hannah quit school at the age of 16 and worked menial jobs in New York City before going on to obtain her GED and college education. She then obtained entry level work at a furniture manufacturer and eventually became showroom manager for the business until her retirement.

Hannah's poetry was influenced and inspired by the memory of her husband Frank who died early in life. They had three children, two boys and a daughter Vivian, and eventually five grandchildren. Her daughter Vivian had Down syndrome and lived with Hannah until Hannah's death, and Hannah dedicated much of her effort in the Miami area supporting disabled people, including her association with the Association for Retarded Citizens (ARC).

Hannah Kahn was poetry editor at The Miami Herald for fifteen years. She remained actively involved in advancing poetry in the South Florida area and conducted workshops in poetry.

== Publications ==
=== Books of poetry ===
Hannah Kahn published two books of poetry, dedicating the first to her late husband Frank:

- Kahn, Hannah (1962). Eve's Daughter, Poems by Hannah Kahn. Florida: Hurricane House. ISBN 0-9602340-1-2.
- Kahn, Hannah (1983). Time Wait, Poems by Hannah Kahn. Orlando, Florida: University Presses of Florida. ISBN 0-8130-0775-5.

Hannah was also co-editor of:

- Orma Jean, Surbey (1969). Wind Child. Olivant Press.

=== Individual poems ===
Hannah authored over 400 individual poems. Her poems were published in a number of American periodicals including American Scholar, Harper's Magazine, Saturday Review, Southwest Review, Ladies' Home Journal, McCall's, and Saturday Evening Post.

She was also responsible for translating from Yiddish to English much of the poetry of Rajzel Żychlińsky.

== Awards ==
Hannah received numerous awards for her poetry at both the national and local levels. Her major awards include those from the Poetry Society of America and the Poetry Society of Great Britain, where she won the International Sonnet Competition. Her poems appear in a number of anthologies.

== Legacy ==
The Hannah Kahn Poetry Foundation was founded in her honor with its charter to "bring poetry events to South Florida." Hannah had been successful in bringing national poets, such as Anthony Hecht, Gwendolyn Brooks, Yehuda Amichai, Dana Gioia, Maxine Kumin, John Haag, Carolyn Kizer and others to read and lecture in South Florida, and the foundation continues that effort.

The Hannah Kahn Poetry Award is presented through the Florida State Poetry Association.

A collection of transcripts of poetry readings by Hannah Kahn is located at the George A. Smathers Libraries Special Collection archives of the University of Florida. Her papers, including correspondence with Conrad Aiken, Pearl S. Buck, Marjory Stoneman Douglas, and others, are located in the archives of the University of Florida.

== See also ==
- Poetry
