= Hannah Turpin =

American curator

Hannah Turpin is an American curator in the contemporary art field. She is the Curatorial Assistant of Photography and Contemporary Art at the Carnegie Museum of Art. She gathered experience with curatorial and collections internships at several institutions including Leslie-Lohman Museum of Gay and Lesbian Art, the Brooklyn Museum, and the Columbus Museum of Art.

Since her arrival in Pittsburgh, she has curated The Seen and The Unseen: Three Artists Visualizing the Boundary of Space and Place at Neu Kirche Contemporary Art Center. She also worked with Casey Droege Cultural Productions and Radiant Hall on a curatorial residency, which brought Chances Dances creators Latham Zearfoss, and Aay Preston-Myint. She also took over co-organizing the Art+Feminism Wikipedia Edit-a-Thon in Pittsburgh in 2017 with Angela Washko, Assistant Professor Of Art at Carnegie Mellon University.

Turpin's work at the Carnegie Museum of Art includes identifying gaps within the contemporary art collection. She has worked on several exhibitions including Shaping a Modern Legacy: Karl and Jennifer Salatka Collect, 20/20: The Studio Museum in Harlem and Carnegie Museum of Art, and Alison Knowles.
