= Hannah Dagoe =

Irish 18th century thief

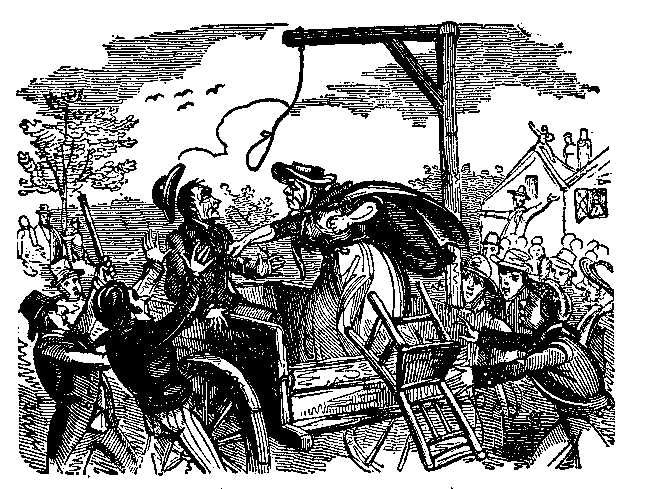
Hannah Dagoe struggling with her executioner

Hannah Dagoe (died 1763) was an Irish basket-woman, sentenced to death for burglary. On the day of her execution, 4 May 1763, in what The Newgate Calendar described as an "extraordinary and unprecedented scene" she struggled violently with the executioner, and with the noose about her neck, flung herself from the cart before the signal was given, dying instantly.

== Life and death ==
Hannah Dagoe was born in Ireland, and was of that numerous class of women who worked at Covent Garden Market as "basket-women", or porters.

Dagoe had previously been incarcerated for debt in Whitechapel Jail, where she married a fellow prisoner, a Spanish seaman from whom she took her surname ("Diego" or "Dago"). After he either left the country or died, she took up with the keeper of the prisoner, one William Connor. She was a strong, masculine woman and the terror of her fellow-prisoners, one of whom she stabbed in a quarrel. For this she was sent to Newgate prison for six months, where she stabbed another man, after no personal provocation, but because he had turned evidence against his accomplices. She was also imprisoned at the Poultry Compter several times.

She became acquainted with a poor and industrious woman of the name of Eleanor Hussey, who lived by herself in a small apartment, in which was some valuable household furniture, the remains of the worldly goods of her deceased husband. Seizing an opportunity, when the owner was away from home, Dagoe broke into Hussey's room and stripped it of every article which it contained.

We have adduced many instances of the hardness of heart, and contempt of the commandments of God, in men who have undergone the last sentence of the law; but we are of opinion that in this female will be found a more relentless heart, in her last moments, than any criminal whom we have yet recorded.

— The Newgate Calendar

For this burglary and robbery she was brought to trial at the Old Bailey, found guilty, and sentenced to death.

The day before she was due to die, James Boswell saw Dagoe in the courtyard of Newgate prison, remarking in his diary that she was a "big unconcerned thing". Although present at the execution, Boswell curiously did not record the unusual manner of her death.

On the road to Tyburn she showed little concern at her miserable state, and paid no attention to the exhortations of the priest who attended her. When the cart, in which she was bound, was drawn under the gallows, she got her hands and arms loose, seized the executioner, struggled with him, and gave him so violent a blow on the breast that she nearly knocked him down. She dared him to hang her; and in order to revenge herself upon him, and cheat him of his dues, she took off her hat, cloak and other parts of her dress, and disposed of them among the crowd. After much resistance he got the rope about her neck, which she had no sooner found accomplished than, pulling out a hand kerchief, she bound it round her head and over her face, and threw herself out of the cart, before the signal was given, with such violence that she broke her neck and died instantly.

== Sources ==
- Gatrell, V. A. C. (1996). The Hanging Tree: Execution and the English People, 1770-1868. Oxford University Press. p. 291.
- Wilkie, J. (1764). Select Trials for Murder, Robbery, Burglary, Rapes, Sodomy, Coining, Forgery, Pyracy, and Other Offences and Misdemeanours, at the Sessions-House in the Old-Bailey: To which are Added Genuine Accounts of the Lives, Exploits, Behaviour, Confessions, and Dying-speeches, of the Most Notorious Convicts, from the Year 1741 to the Present Year, 1764, Inclusive, which Completes the Trials from the Year 1720, Volume 4.
- Knapp, Andrew; Baldwin, William (1825). The Newgate Calendar: Comprising Interesting Memoirs of the Most Notorious Characters who Have Been Convicted of Outrages on the Laws of England Since the Commencement of the Eighteenth Century : with Occasional Anecdotes and Observations, Speeches, Confessions, and the Last Exclamations of Suffers. Vol. 2. J. Robins and Company.
