= Hannah P. Dodge =

American educator

Hannah Perkins Dodge
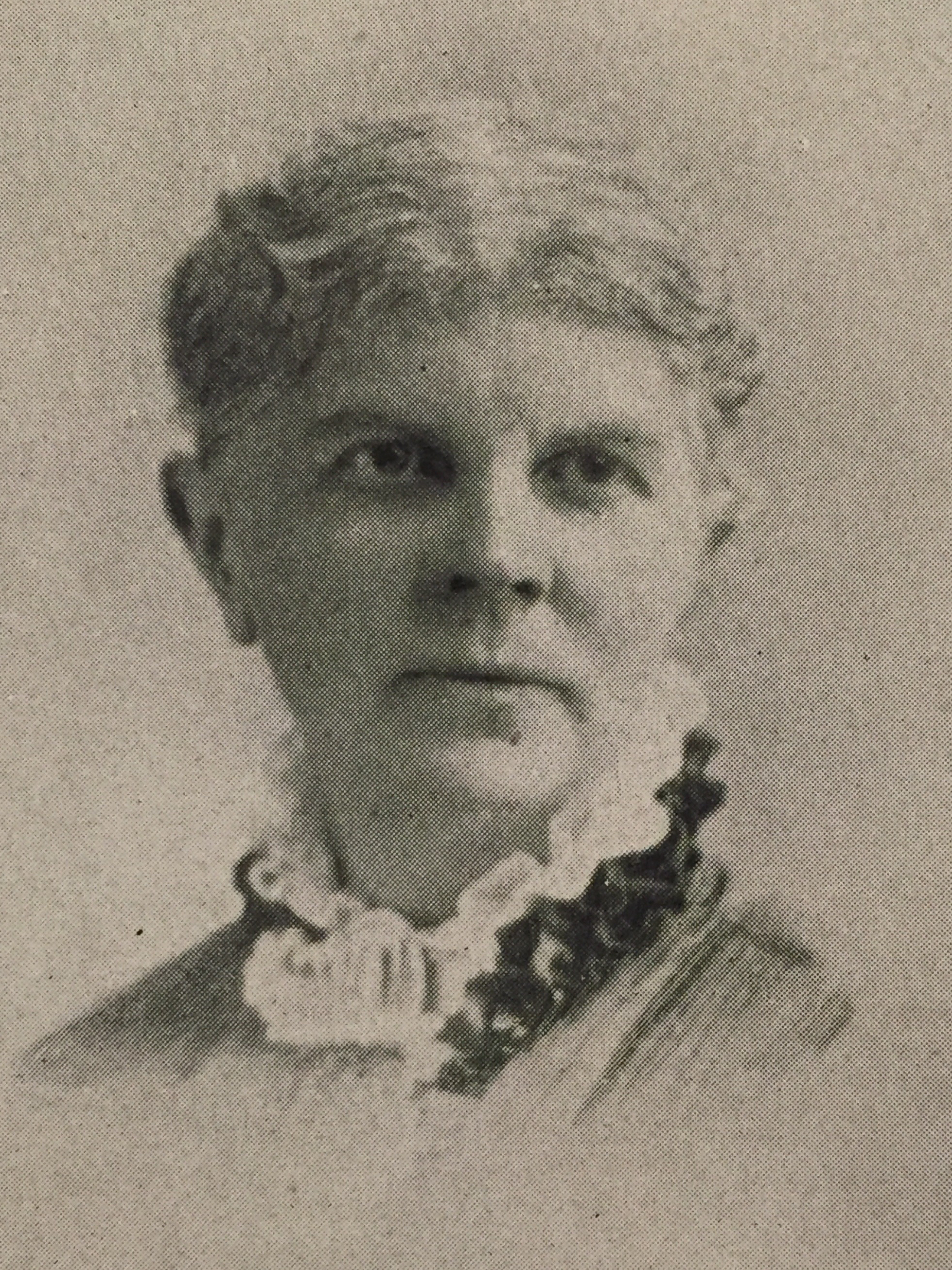
- Born: February 16, 1821; Littleton, Massachusetts
- Died: January 11, 1896 (aged 74); Littleton, Massachusetts
- Burial place: Westlawn Cemetery, Littleton
- Occupations: Educator and poet
- Known for: Woman of the Century

Hannah Perkins Dodge (February 16, 1821 – January 11, 1896) was an American educator and poet.

== Early life ==
Hannah Perkins Dodge was born on a farm in Littleton, Massachusetts, on 16 February 1821, where her girlhood was spent. She was the oldest of eight children born to Barnabas Dodge (1795–1873) and Sarah Corning (1800–1888). At least three of her ancestors served in the Revolutionary War - one of them being captain in Col. Gerrish's regiment in service at the Battle of Bunker Hill.

Dodge attended the public school and afterward spent several terms in a select school for young ladies.

== Career ==
When Hannah P. Dodge was seventeen years old, she began to teach at a district school in a neighboring town. She next taught successfully in her own town. After teaching for some terms, Dodge went to the Lawrence Academy at Groton, Massachusetts. She completed her education at the Townsend Female Seminary, in Townsend, Massachusetts. After graduating from that school in 1844, Dodge was chosen as a teacher in the institution. One year later she was chosen principal of the school, a position which she held for seven years. Dodge held the position of principal in the Oread Institute in Worcester, Massachusetts, for several years, traveled in Europe for a year and there studied modern languages and art. After her sojourn in Europe, Dodge took a desirable position in Dorchester, Boston, where she successfully managed the Codman Hill Young Ladies' School for five years. She was also on the faculty of the Ladies' Department Kalamazoo College, Michigan, and of the Colby Academy, New London, New Hampshire. Retiring from the school field in 1877, she purchased a pleasant home in Littleton, where her family remained. In that town, she was the first woman Superintendent of Schools from 1878 to 1882.

Dodge was president of the local Woman's Christian Temperance Union and one of the trustees of the public library, and she was active in charitable work.

She was a poet, a writer, a correspondent and an artist.

Attending the Baptist church in Littleton in 1840, Dodge loyally retained her membership with it, thereby imparting to the home church the luster of her fame and character.

She was actively interested in the lyceum, the library, the schools, the Temperance movement and in all the work of the church and Sunday school.

== Personal life ==
Dodge died in Littleton on January 11, 1896, and is buried at Westlawn Cemetery, Littleton.
