= Hannah Beckerman =

English author and journalist

Hannah Beckerman is an English author and journalist. She studied at King's College London and Westfield College. She has worked with The Observer, The Guardian, the FT Weekend Magazine and The Sunday Express and has worked for twelve years in television including BBC's The Big Read. Beckerman lives in London with her husband and daughter.

She wrote five novels:

- The Dead Wife's Handbook (Penguin, Feb 13, 2014)
- If Only I Could Tell You (Orion, Feb 21, 2019)
- The Impossible Truths of Love
- The forgetting
- Three Mothers (Lake Union Publishing, 2025)
