= Hannah Cohen (philanthropist) =

English philanthropist and civil servant

Hannah Floretta Cohen OBE (1875-1946) was an English civil servant and philanthropist, and the first woman to be president of the Jewish Board of Guardians.

== Life ==
Cohen was born on 25 May 1875 in Kensington, London, the daughter of Conservative politician Sir Benjamin Cohen (1844-1909) and Louisa Emily Merton (1850-1931), both of whom were great-grandchildren of Levy Barent Cohen (1747-1808), of whom The Jewish Encyclopedia says that "Through the distinguished marriages which his children contracted, nearly all the leading Jewish families in England are connected with him". She was educated at Roedean School and read classics at Newnham College, Cambridge(1894–97) and "grew up in an opulent Anglo-Jewish milieu in which it was accepted that members of the dominant families would assume the burdens of communal leadership".

In 1937 she published Changing faces : A memoir of Louisa Lady Cohen by her daughter (Martin Hopkinson & Co.) which her father's ODNB biographer described as "an engaging, if not always factually accurate, memoir of her family".

In later life she was a member of the governing body of many organisations including Roedean and Newnham, Swanley Horticultural College, and the Jewish orphanage at Norwood. She did not marry, and died in Hindhead, Surrey on 21 November 1946.

== Civil service ==
During World War I she worked first at the Home Office (1916-1917) and then at HM Treasury (1917-1920); she was one of the first women to hold a senior post in the British civil service, and was appointed OBE for her work at the Treasury.

== Board of Guardians ==
In 1900 Cohen was the first woman to be elected a member of the Jewish Board of Guardians, a charity established in 1859 to provide relief for poor Jewish immigrants, which continues today as Jewish Care. She became the first woman to hold the role of honorary secretary in 1925, vice-president in 1926, and president in 1930, until 1940. Her uncle Lionel Louis Cohen (1832–1887), her father, and her cousin Sir Lionel Cohen had all been previous presidents.
