= Hannah Holmes =

American writer, journalist, essayist, and science commentator

Hannah Holmes (born 1963) is an American writer, journalist, essayist, and science commentator for Science Live (Discovery Channel) and radio shows such as Maine Things Considered. She has published four books, most recently Quirk: Brain Science Makes Sense of Your Peculiar Personality (Random House, 2011). She has published articles online and in magazines including Sierra, New York Times Magazine, L.A.Times Magazine, Outside, Islands, and Escape. She earned a B.A. from University of Southern Maine in 1988, and lives in Portland, Maine.

== Published works ==
- Quirk: : Brain Science Makes Sense of Your Peculiar Personality, Random House, 2011, ISBN 978-1-4000-6840-1
- The Well-dressed Ape: A Natural History of Myself, Random House, 2008, ISBN 978-0-8129-7629-8
- Suburban Safari: A Year on the Lawn, Bloomsbury Publishing, 2005, ISBN 978-1-59691-091-1
- The Secret Life of Dust: From the Cosmos to the Kitchen Counter, the Big Consequences of Little Things, Wiley-Blackwell, 2001
