= Hannah Blank =

American author (1930–2013)

- Born: June 13, 1930; New York City, U.S.
- Died: January 7, 2013 (aged 82); Delray Beach, Florida, U.S.
- Occupations: Novelist, writer
- Writing career
- Period: Modern
- Genre: Mystery
- Notable works: A Murder of Convenience (1999); Brave Man Dead (2001); A Short Life on a Sunny Isle (2002)
- Website: www.hannahblank.com

Hannah Blank (June 13, 1930 – January 7, 2013) was an American author. She died in Delray Beach, Florida on January 7, 2013, at the age of 82.

== Bibliography ==
- A Murder of Convenience (1999) ISBN 0-9652778-1-X
- Brave Man Dead (2001) ISBN 0-9652778-3-6
- A Short Life on a Sunny Isle (2002) ISBN 0-9652778-4-4

== See also ==
- List of horror fiction authors
