= Hannah Robertson (autobiographer) =

Scottish instructional writer 1724–1800

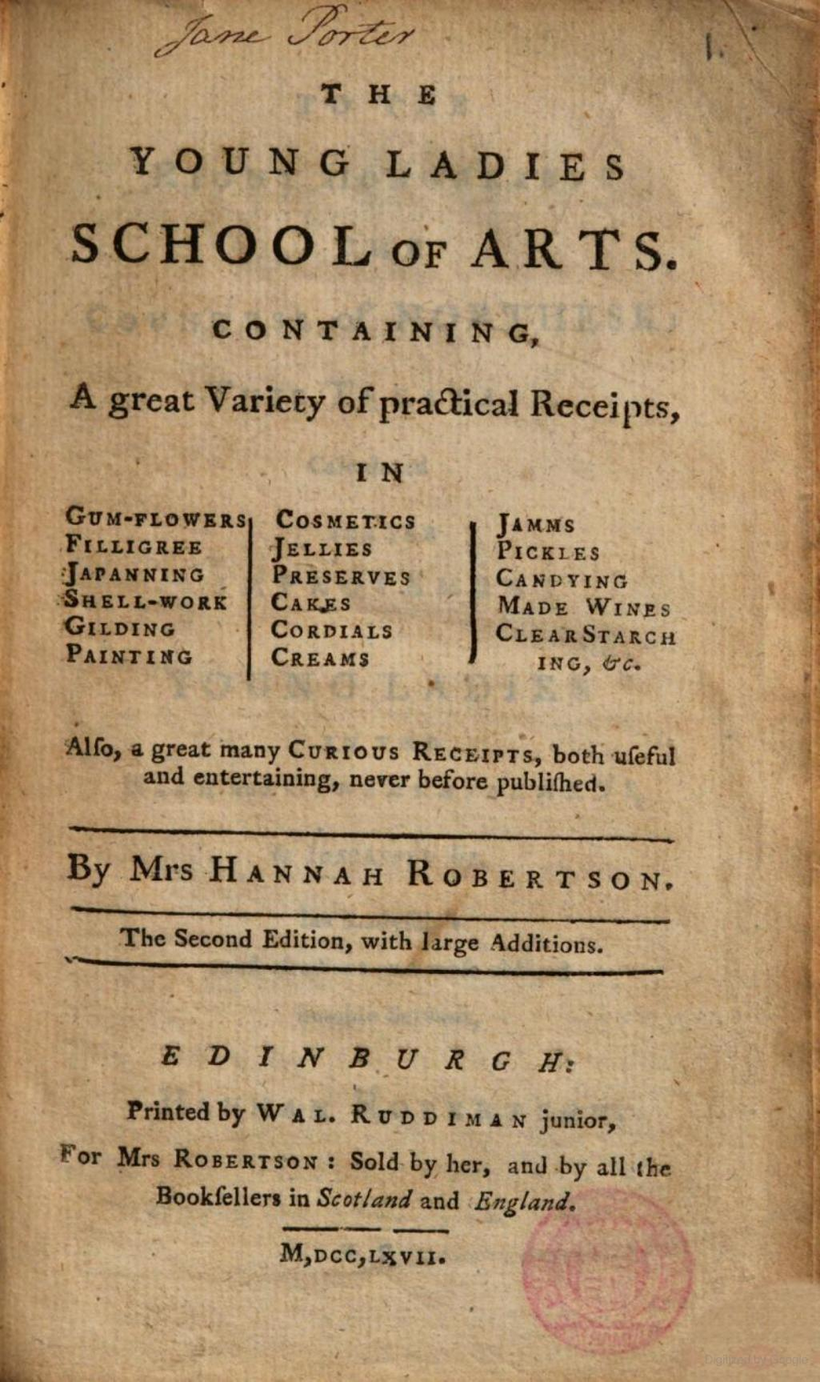
Title page of Hannah Robertson's The Young Ladies School of Arts, 2nd ed., 1767. (Google)

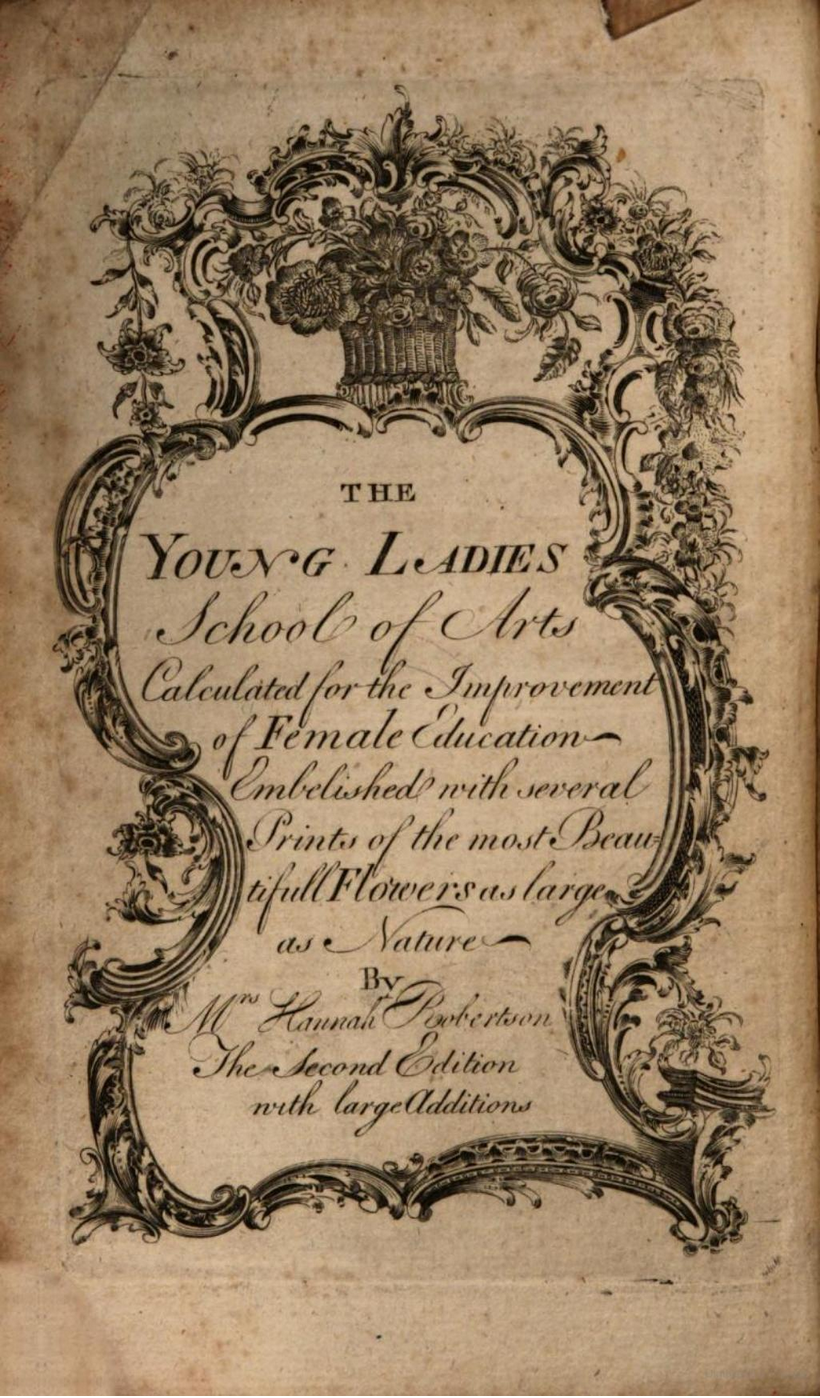
Frontispiece of Hannah Robertson's The Young Ladies School of Arts, 2nd ed., 1767. (Google)

Hannah Robertson (1724—1800?) was a Scottish autobiographer, instructional writer, and teacher.

== Life ==
In her autobiography, Robertson claims that her father, named Swan, was a son of Charles II. She was one of six children her father had with his second wife and he died shortly after her birth. Her mother remarried and ran a linen manufactory before moving to Glasgow when Robertson was six. In 1736 the family moved to Perth. Robertson describes two unlucky engagements before an unhappy marriage to a wealthy man who went bankrupt in 1756. She paid off his debts by running a successful pub in Aberdeen. In 1771, he froze to death in a storm. The lives of her children were also eventful.

Robertson moved to Edinburgh, York, London, Northampton, and finally Birmingham, where she appears to have settled. In these various locations it seems that she taught filigree, japanning, and other fashionable accomplishments for young ladies. Her major work, The young ladies school of arts, went into multiple printings in the decades after its initial publication in 1766, each new edition "corrected", with "large additions". The full title of the fourth edition gives some idea of the contents:

The young ladies school of arts. Containing a great variety of practical receipts, in gum-flowers, filligree, japanning, Shell-Work, Gilding, Painting, Cosmetics, Jellies, Preserves, Cakes, Cordials, Creams, Jamms, Pickles, Candying, Made Wines, Clear Starching, &c together with directions for breeding canary birds, and breeding, nursing, and ordering of the silk-worm. Also a great many Curious Receipts, both useful and entertaining, never before published. By Mrs. Hannah Robertson. The fourth edition, with large additions.

The sales of her book, however, were not enough to keep her from poverty, as she made clear in the autobiography published toward the end of her life. In its final pages she expresses the intent to pursue claims based on her father's royal parentage. Little is known of Robertson in her final years.

== Works ==
=== Bibliography ===
- The young ladies school of arts: containing, a great variety of practical receipts, ... by Mrs Hannah Robertson. Edinburgh: Walter Ruddiman Junior, 1766. (multiple editions)
- The life of Mrs. Robertson, (a tale of truth as well as of sorrow) who, though a grand-daughter of Charles II. has been reduced, by a Variety of Very Uncommon Events, From splendid Affluence to the greatest poverty. And, After Having Buried Nine Children, is Obliged, At the age of Sixty-Seven, To earn a scanty Maintenance for herself and two Orphan Grand-Children, By teaching Embroidery, Filligree, and the Art of making Artificial Flowers. Derby: John Drewry, 1791.

=== Etexts ===
- The young ladies school of arts. Containing a great variety of practical receipts, in gum-flowers filligree ... clear starching, &c. ... By Mrs. Hannah Robertson. - The fourth edition, with large additions. 1777 (Etext, Internet Archive)

== Notes and references ==
=== References ===
- "Robertson, Hannah". The Women's Print History Project, 2019, Person ID 1529. Accessed 2023-08-09.
- Todd, Janet, ed. "Robertson, Hannah (1724—1800?)". A Dictionary of British and American women writers, 1660-1800. Totowa, N.J.: Rowman & Allanheld, 1985, pp. 269–270. (Etext, Internet Archive)
