= Hannah Marshall =

Hannah Marshall may refer to:

- Hannah Marshall (visual artist) (born 1982), British visual artist and former fashion designer
- Hannah Marshall (actress) (born 1984), New Zealand actress
- Hannah Marshall (musician) (born 1973), British jazz musician and composer
