= Hannah Kihalani Springer =

Hawaiian environmentalist, educator

Hannah Kihalani Springer is a Hawaiian scholar, communicator, environmentalist, and storyteller. She is a former trustee of the Office of Hawaiian Affairs, and an advocate of the "Try Wait" initiative as a member of the Kaʻūpūlehu Marine Life Advisory Committee (KMLAC).

Springer has advocated for the expansion of the Papahānaumokuākea National Monument, and is a council member of Kuaʻāina Ulu ʻAuamo and the president and board member of the Akaka Foundation for Tropical Forests.

== Career ==
I am shaped by my geography.

— Hannah Kihalani Springer, Kukuiohiwai, The Global Intercultural Communication Reader (2013)

Springer is an educator on indigenous Hawaiian culture and advocate for the protection of the Hawaiian environment. She is an author of Kōkua aku, kōkua mai: an indigenous consensus-driven and place-based approach to community led dry land restoration and stewardship, which details the forced relocation of many Indigenous people of the Hawaiian land, coupled with the disruption of the natural ecology. Springer has worked with multiple outlets to publish stories of Hawaii, including through the Kona Historical Society, the University of Hawaiʻi at Hilo, the Hawaiʻi Tourism Authority's Kūkulu Ola—Living Hawaiian Culture Program, and joined multiple podcasts, including Ka Leo o ka Uluau.

During our time, we have seen aliʻi (royalty) rise and fall. We have seen our island nation born and die before its time. We have seen political parties wax and wane. We have seen elected and appointed officials come and go. But we remain. We have been chiefs and fishermen, goat herders and cattle ranchers, gardeners and homemakers. We have lived under two flags and a series of constitutions. Personally, caring less about the flag flying over the land than the life on the land, we aspire to contentment and to share the joy and blessing of calling Hawaiʻi Nei home. We aloha kekahi i kekahi (love or have reciprocity with one another), and mālama (care for) the same. And we remain on the land and pray that this long be so.

— Hannah Kihalani Springer, Lineal Descendant of Kaʻūpūlehu, "Indigenous stewardship through novel approaches to collaborative management in Hawaiʻi", Ecology & Society (March 2023)

In 1979, Springer began work at the Pu'ukohola Heiau National Historic Site, and was an employee as well as a volunteer at the annual cultural festivals. In 1986, she presented a lecture at the site on political conflicts and warfare in Hawaii between 1778 and 1898, and was a planner for the County of Hawaii.

In November 1996, Springer was elected trustee to the Office of Hawaiian Affairs. In 2001, as president of the nonprofit ʻAhahui o Puʻu Waʻawaʻa, she advocated for the protection of endangered plants during a campaign to encourage the state Board of Land and Natural Resources to assume the lease of 21,000 acres at Puuwaawaa in a proposal that would allow Hawaiians and non-Hawaiians to act as stewards and create some limits on ranching and hunting.

As a member of the Kaʻūpūlehu Marine Life Advisory Committee (KMLAC), Springer was an advocate of the "Try Wait" initiative for fish restoration, which was a proposal to create an area without fishing to restore declining fish populations, with the title based on "a play on a colloquial term uttered when requesting patience." In 2016, a 10-year "rest area" was created by the Hawaii Department of Land and Natural Resources through the establishment of the Kaʻūpūlehu Marine Reserve on the Kona coast of the Big Island.

On September 7, 2014, Springer authored an op-ed entitled "Expansion of Pacific marine sanctuary is consistent with Hawaiian practice", which was a call to action to then-president Barack Obama to increase the size of the Pacific Remote Islands Marine National Monument, in order to replenish the natural resources of the Hawaiian Islands. The area was increased in size by Presidential Proclamation on September 25, 2014.

Springer is a council member of Kuaʻāina Ulu ʻAuamo, and president and board member of the Akaka Foundation for Tropical forests.

== Personal life ==
Springer is a Hawaiian elder, whose family has lived in the North Kona region of the Big Island of Hawaiʻi for generations. Her home, Kukuiʻohiwai, was historically part of Huʻehuʻe Ranch. She has said that her native Hawaiian lineage can be traced back for 93 generations. Her great-grandmother was Mary Kihalani Parker Maguire.

Her family participated in a local forest restoration project for the Ka'ūpūlehu Dryland Forest in the 1990s that began to be formally managed by the Hawaiʻi Forest Institute in 1994. Springer is married to Michael Prosper Tomich, and has two children.
