= Hannah Shaw =

Hannah Shaw may refer to:

- Hannah Shaw (basketball) (born 1990), British basketball player
- Hannah Shaw (internet celebrity) also known as the Kitten Lady, animal rights advocate
