= Hannah English Williams =

American natural history collector (died 1722)

Hannah English Williams (died 1722) was a collector of natural history in the American British Colonies during the early 18th century. Hannah English Williams lived near Stoney Point along the Ashley River while managing lands that provided area for her collection. Living near Charleston, South Carolina, she aided in documenting South Carolina's natural resources. She was married twice in her life, first to Matthew English, then she later married William Williams in her life. She is documented as the first female to collect specimens of plants and animals in the American British colonies and send them back overseas for scientific collections in London.

== Personal life ==
Hannah English Williams married Matthew English and had two children with him, Mary and Henroyda. After the death of her husband, she was entitled to five hundred acres of land near Stony Point in November of 1692. She then wedded William Williams, an adjacent plantation owner, and gained another five hundred acres of land close to the Ashley River to add to her property near Stony Point. Williams William provided Hannah many social and economic benefits. Later in her life, she wrote a letter to request medical recommendations and pharmaceuticals for issues with her spleen. English Williams was buried on 16 December 1722 in St. Philip's Churchyard in Charleston, South Carolina. These specimens included plants, insects, shells, and reptiles. She used these collected specimens to preserve in pins/vails using rum or brandy. She then would ship these specimens that she curated through Major William Halstead's vessels.

== Career ==
Hannah English Williams was the first female to aid in the transmission of flora and fauna from the British colonies in America back to Britain. She exchanged letters with James Petiver, a Fellow of the Royal Society of London for Improving Natural Knowledge, after being originally united in their shared curiosity by ship master William Halstead from South Carolina. As a part of Petiver's system of collectors, she was given instruction and materials for how to keep the specimens properly for transportation back to Britain. These shipments of organisms back to Petiver included many types of insects such as butterflies, flies, moths, bees, wasps and grasshoppers, along with other animals like snakes, scorpions, and lizards. English Williams also collected shells and plants to send for further study in Europe, along with artifacts from Indigenous peoples such as a "Westo Kings Tobacco pipe and a Queens Petticoat made of Moss". Within the four kept letters between Petiver and English Williams, it is noted that her discoveries, specifically of unique butterflies, were acknowledged by Petiver. Petiver named a few butterfly species after her including: "William's orange girdle Carolina butterfly, William's yellow tipt Carolina butterfly, and William's selvedge-eyed Carolina butterfly."

According to the South Carolina Encyclopedia, English Williams assisted in promoting botanical and zoological appreciation through her collections in the New World.
