= Hannah Johnson Carter =

American art educator

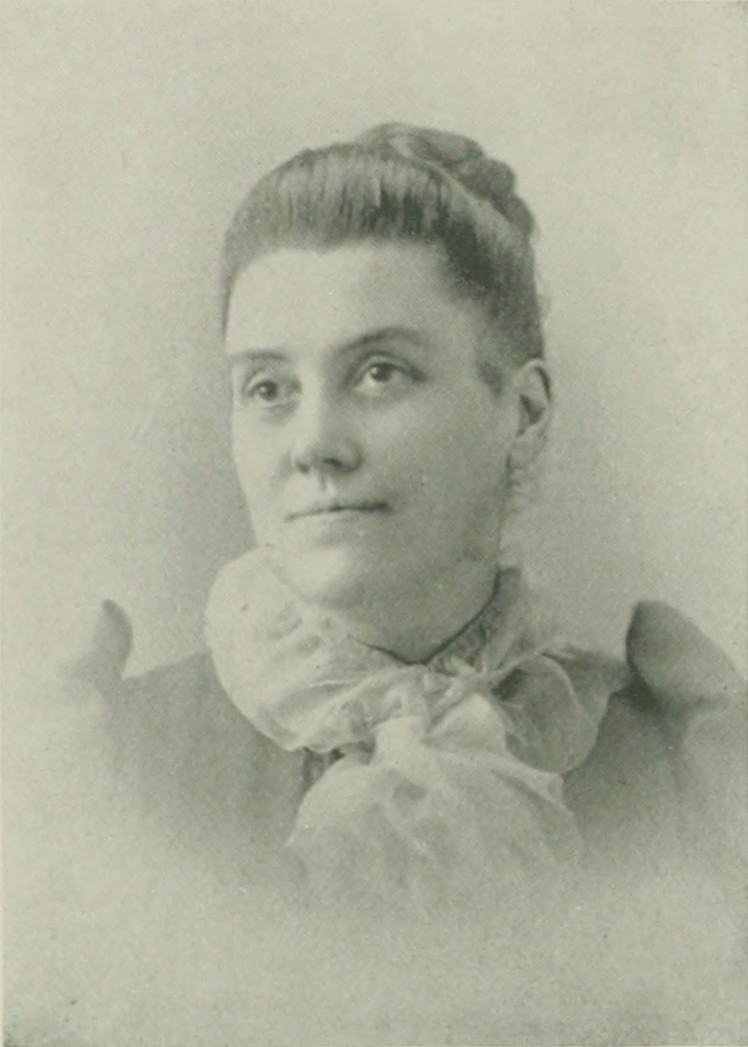
Hannah Johnson Carter

Hannah Johnson Carter was a 19th-century American art educator from the U.S. state of Maine. She served as chair of form and drawing in the College for the Training of Teachers, president of the art department of the National Education Association, and director of the art department in the Drexel Institute of Art, Science and Industry (now known as Drexel University).

== Early years and education ==
Hannah True was born in Portland, Maine, the only child of Jonathan True and Hannah True, his wife. Carter's father was a wealthy importer and commission merchant. Her mother died young, leaving her infant daughter to the care of a devoted father who, early recognizing the artistic tastes of his child, gave her considerable training in that direction.

== Career ==
In 1868, she became the wife of Henry Theophilus Carter, a mechanical engineer and manufacturer. The marriage was happy and congenial, with wealth and high social standing. Financial losses, the failing health of her husband, the death of a child, and the loneliness of widowhood all came in quick succession, forcing her to look for ways to support herself and a child. With the life insurance left her by her husband, Carter entered the Massachusetts Normal Art School (now known as Massachusetts College of Art and Design) and was graduated with high standing. After a year's further study with private teachers in first-class studios, she went to Kingston, Canada, to direct an art school, where she succeeded in establishing the school on a permanent basis. At the close of the first year, she was obliged to return to Boston, as the climate of Canada was too severe for her health. For two years, she was associated with the Prang Educational Company, of that city, doing various work pertaining to its educational department, such as illustrating drawing-books and often acting as drawing supervisor.

In the fall of 1887, she was called to New York City to take the chair of professor of form and drawing in the College for the Training of Teachers, and in 1890, she was elected president of the art department of the National Educational Association. In 1891, she was made director of the art department in the Drexel Institute of Art, Science and Industry, in Philadelphia, Pennsylvania. Carter was appointed on many industrial, educational and art committees. She had an interest in general art education, believing enthusiastically in the necessity of educating and elevating public taste by beginning early with the training of children for a love of the aesthetic.

== Selected works ==
- Suggestions for the teaching of color (1890)
