= Hannah Bluma Sultz =

Lithuanian Hebrew poet

Hannah Bluma Sultz (Hebrew: חנה־בלומה סולץ; fl. 19th century; born in Vilna) was a Lithuanian Hebrew poet. She was among the few women to publish literary works during the Haskalah period.

Her poems include Ha-Maḥaze ('The Play', 1882), a 54-stanza allegory of the power of wealth, and Gei Ḥizayon ('The Valley of Revelation', 1883), a description of a prophetic Zionist vision, published as special additions to the 10th and 11th volumes of Ha-Shaḥar, respectively.

== Bibliography ==
- "Ha-Maḥaze" [The Play]. Ha-Shaḥar. 10 (8). 1882.
- "Gei Ḥizayon" [The Valley of Revelation]. Ha-Shaḥar. 11 (1): 69–72. 1883.
