= Hannah Martin (disambiguation) =

Hannah Martin is a character on the soap opera Neighbours.

Hannah Martin may also refer to:

- Hannah Martin (field hockey) (born 1994), British field hockey player
- Hannah Martin (judoka) (born 1988), American judoka
- Hannah Martin (footballer) (born 1996), Australian rules footballer
- Hannah Martin (volleyball) (born 1990), Australian volleyball player
- Hannah Martin, English folk musician, part of Edgelarks

== See also ==
- Martin Hannah (1865–1953), Australian politician
