= Hannah Thurber Fairfield =

American portrait painter

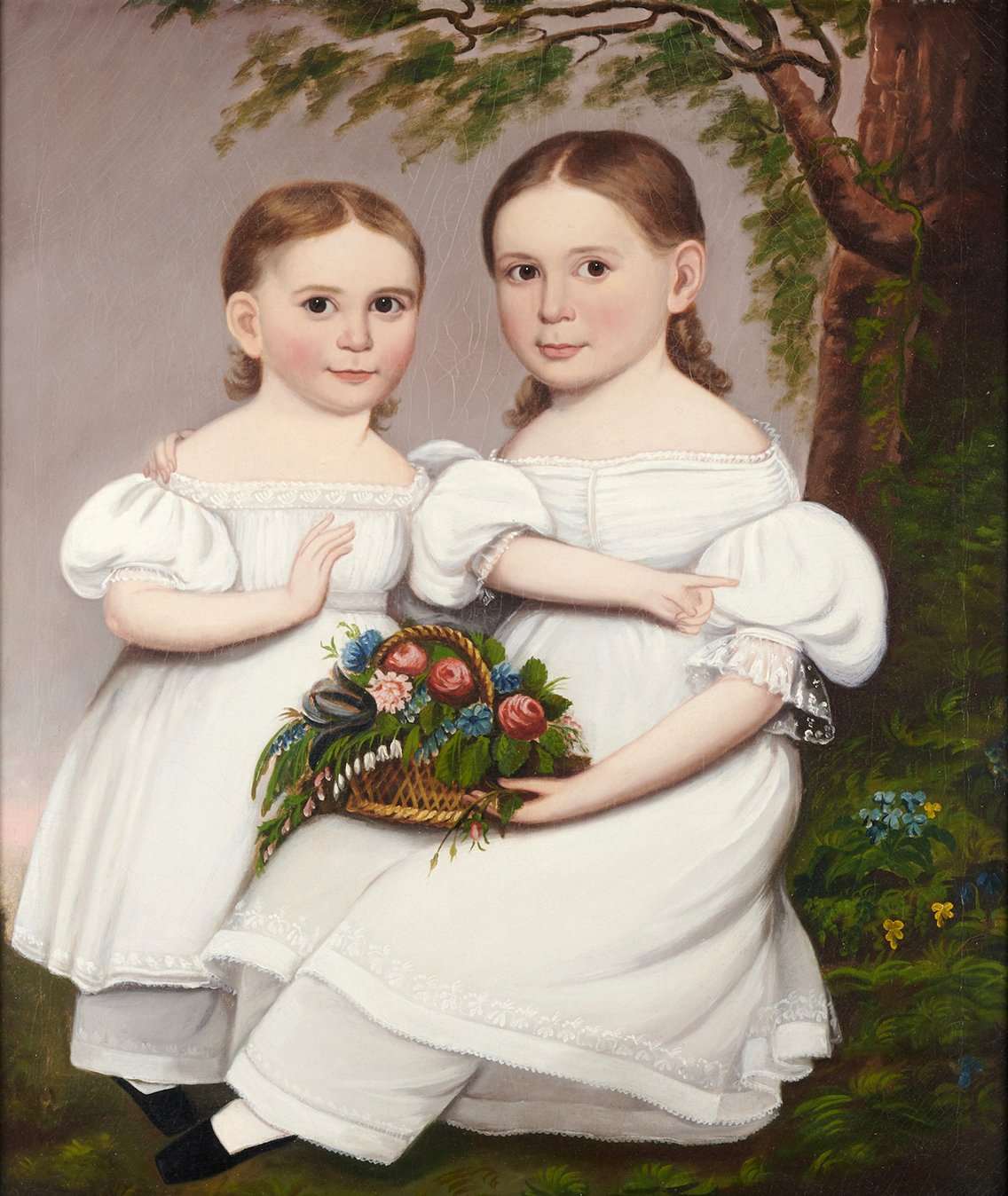
- Portrait of Lucy Adams Tracy and Ellen Nichols Tracy by Hannah Thurber Fairfield
- Born: January 26, 1808
- Died: July 15, 1894
- Occupation: Painter

Hannah Thurber Fairfield Nichols (January 26, 1808 – July 15, 1894) was an American portrait painter.

Hannah Thurber Fairfield was born in Woodstock, Windham County, Connecticut, the daughter of David and Hannah Thurber Fairfield. She studied painting under Francis Alexander and Alexander Robinson. She was active as a portrait painter in New York City from around 1835 to 1839. Her portraits were large, often of children, and featured a bright palette.

In 1839, she married businessman Franklin Nichols. They moved to Norwalk, Connecticut and her painting career likely ended at that point.
