= Hannah Sorensen =

Danish midwife

Hannah Sorensen (1836 – death year) is a Danish midwife who converted to the Church of Jesus Christ of Latter-day Saints (LDS Church) and immigrated to Utah. She graduated from the Royal Hospital of Denmark and practiced obstetrics for the Danish government for 22 years before converting to the church. When she immigrated to the United States of America, she taught classes all over Utah concerning women's hygiene. She also authored a book called What Women Should Know about women's health.

== Biography ==
Hannah Sorensen was born in 1836 in Snedsted, Denmark. She graduated from the Royal Hospital of Denmark at the age of 25, after which she practiced obstetrics for the Danish government for 22 years. She joined the LDS Church in 1883. Because of her conversion to the LDS Church, she lost her job with the government, and her husband left her, with whom she had ten children. Her and her four youngest children were forced to move into a poor house. Her husband took her three sons and placed them in foster care. Her daughter, Maria, was taken to the United States by friends of Sorensen's. A few months later, Sorensen immigrated to the United States with the help of the LDS Church.

She moved to Utah and used her knowledge of obstetrics to teach classes around Utah concerning women's hygiene in the 1890s. She moved to Bluff, Utah, to begin her courses. Her courses, entitled Woman's Hygienic Physiological Reform Class, were six weeks long, and she mostly taught in rural areas where women would not have easy access to this knowledge. Her topics included hygiene, obstetrics, and sexual physiology. These classes became permanent fixtures in cities in Utah Valley, and she taught hundreds of students since 1889. She served as the president of the Woman's Physiological Reform class as well as a teacher. She also wrote a book called What Women Should Know in an effort to teach more about women's health. She also wrote down her notes from her classes to serve as a textbook and reference for students after they took her class.
