= Hannah Kallem =

Norwegian-born American army nurse

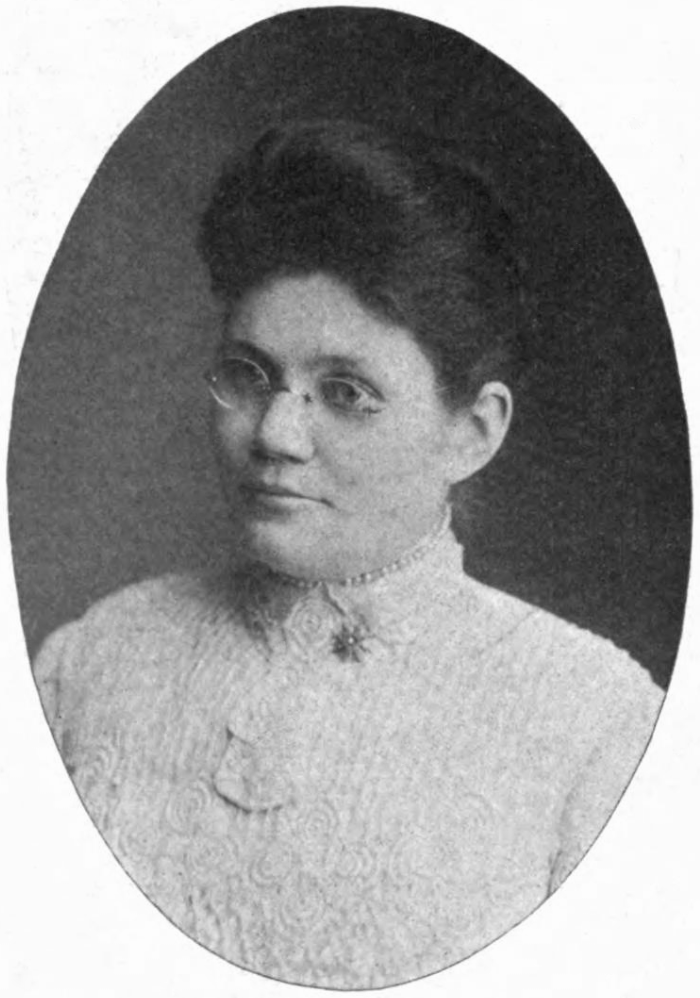
Hannah A. Kallem, from a 1905 publication

Hannah A. Kallem (August 18, 1865 – June 16, 1937) was a Norwegian-born American army nurse.

== Early life ==
Hannah A. Kallem was born in Haugesund, Norway, the daughter of Samuel Kallem and Anne Serina Nedrebøe Kallem. She moved to the United States as a very young child, when her parents emigrated in 1867. Her mother died later that year, and the surviving family including young Hannah eventually settled in Chicago, Illinois. She studied nursing in St. Paul, Minnesota, completing her training in 1894.

== Career ==
Kallem had a long career as a nurse in the United States Army Nurse Corps. She was a member of the Order of Spanish–American War Nurses. She served in the Philippines in 1909. and was assigned to various military bases in the United States, in Arkansas, Maryland, New Mexico, and California. She worked during an epidemic at Fort McPherson in Atlanta, Georgia in 1898, reporting in a published letter that "I heard that we have 500 typhoid fever cases here." She was at a gathering of Spanish–American War nurses at the 1904 World's Fair in St. Louis.

== Personal life ==
Hannah A. Kallem retired in 1928 and died at Letterman Army Hospital in San Francisco in 1937, aged 71 years. Her remains were buried at the San Francisco National Cemetery.
