= Hannah Ama Nyarko =

Ghana politician

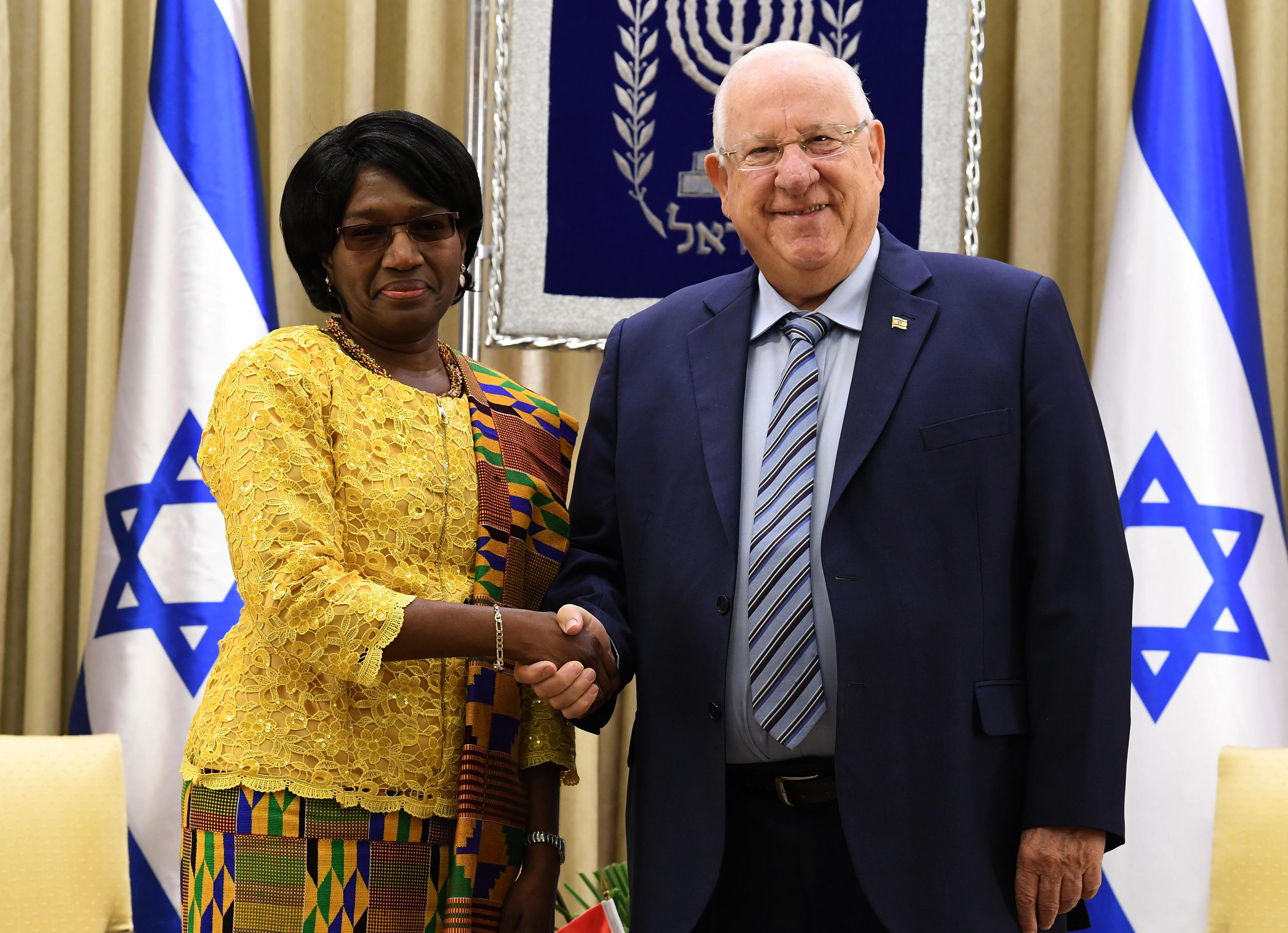
Reuven Rivlin receives the credentials new Ambassadors, March 2018

Hannah Ama Nyarko (born 25 July 1964) has been Ghana's ambassador to Israel since January 2018. Nyarko is Ghana's first female ambassador to the State of Israel.

== Education ==
Nyarko holds Bachelor of Science degree in Administration and a Master of Arts degree in international affairs from University of Ghana.
