= Hannah E. Taylor =

American poet

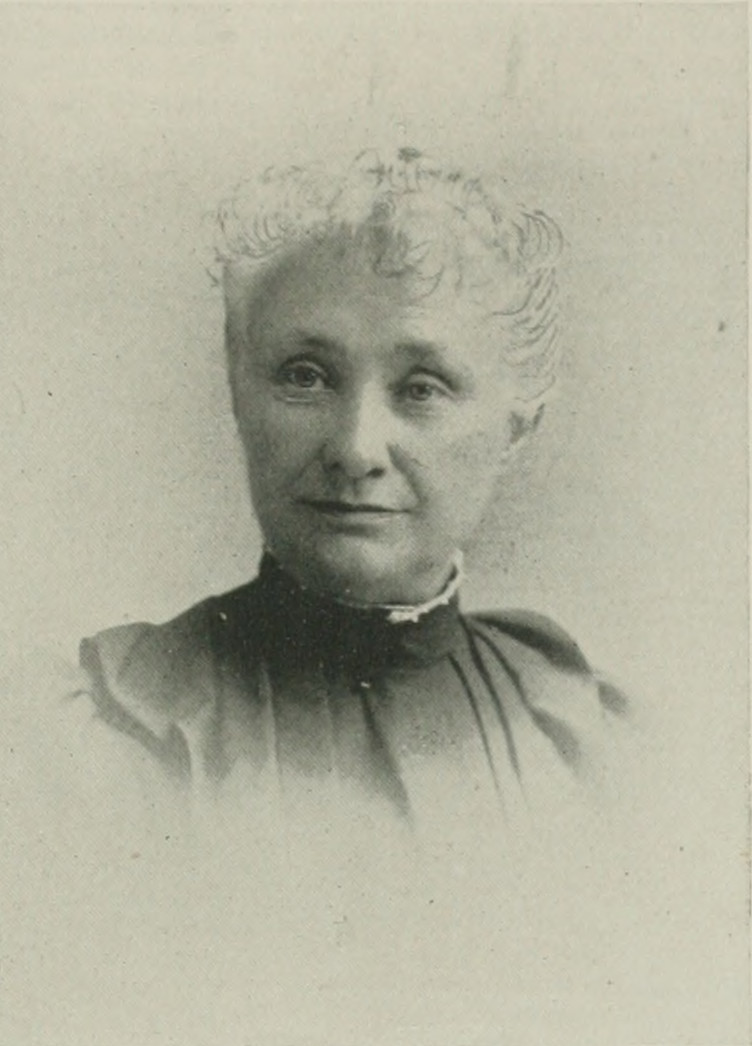
Taylor, from A Woman of the Century

Hannah E. Barker Taylor (born August 18, 1835) was a poet and active member of the Woman's Christian Temperance Union.

== Early life ==
Hannah E. Barker was born in Fredericton, New Brunswick, on August 18, 1835. She was of English descent and Native American for five generations. Barker's father was born and bred in New Brunswick, where he married Elizabeth Ann Sewell. He moved to Hartford, Connecticut, and reared his family there.

Barker received her education in Fredericton and in Hartford. During her school life, her compositions were spoken of highly. Music was her passion, and, possessing a fine voice, it was the wish of her parents that she should study music as a profession.

== Career ==
Barker accepted a position as leading soprano in the First Baptist Church of Hartford, teaching music meanwhile.

During all those years, she was writing poems, but it was only towards the end of the 19th century that any of her compositions were published.

Hannah Taylor was an active member of the Woman's Christian Temperance Union; she was corresponding secretary of the Pasadena branch of the Women's National Indian Association, and was the recording secretary of the State Association.

== Personal life ==
In 1874, Hannah E. Barker married George Taylor. The Taylors resided in Pasadena, California, where for several years George Taylor was the secretary of the Young Men's Christian Association.
