= Hannah Vogt =

German historian & politician (1910–1994)

Hannah Vogt (3 March 1910, Berlin – 13 February 1994, Göttingen) was a German historian who wrote the best-selling book The Burden of Guilt: A Short History of Germany, 1914-1945. It was first published in Germany in 1961 and sold 400,000 copies in the first two years.

== Bibliography ==
- The Burden of Guilt: A Short History of Germany, 1914–1945, Hannah Vogt, Verrlag Moritz, 1961 ISBN 0-19-501093-0
