= Hannah Foster =

Hannah Foster is the name of:

- Hannah Webster Foster (1758–1840), American novelist
- Hannah Foster (murder victim) (1985–2003), British murder victim
- Hannah Foster (UK politician), Conservative candidate for Exeter (UK Parliament constituency)
