= Hannah E. Hashkes =

Israeli philosopher

Dr. Hannah E. Hashkes (Hebrew: חנה השקס) is an Israeli philosopher of Jewish thought.

Hashkes studied at the Hebrew University of Jerusalem, and wrote her (2004) Ph.D. dissertation on American pragmatism. It is entitled “Philosophy and the Role of the Philosopher in American Pragmatism”. In this work, Hashkes provided a detailed examination of the thought of the main classical American pragmatists - Peirce, James, and Dewey - while analyzing the neo-pragmatism of Richard Rorty in comparison to them.

Hashkes has lectured in philosophy, Judaic Studies and Women’s studies in various colleges and universities in the United States and Israel.

Her book, Rabbinic Discourse as a System of Knowledge was published by Brill in March 2015.
