= Hannah Wood =

Hannah Wood may refer to:

- Hannah Wood (actress), who appeared on an episode of the MTV reality show The Osbournes
- Hannah Wood (nurse) (1827-1903), Northern Territory nurse and rights activist
- Hannah Wood (athlete), British hurdler and competitor at the 2003 European U23 Championships
