= Hannah Scott =

Hannah Scott may refer to:

- Hannah Scott (footballer) (born 1990), retired Australian rules footballer who played for the Western Bulldogs
- Hannah Scott (General Hospital), character on General Hospital
- Hannah Scott (rower), British Olympian rower
- Hannah Scott, victim of the Dunblane massacre
