= Jillian Hunter =

American author

- Born: 1950 (age 75–76)
- Occupation: Author
- Children: 3
- Writing career
- Genre: Historical romance
- Website: www.jillianhunterauthor.com

Jillian Hunter (born 1950) is an American author of historical romance novels. In 2015, Hunter's Forbidden to love the duke was featured in NPR's list of 'books to light your fire for Valentine's Day'. Hunter was born in Scotland to a Welsh mother and an American father. When her father became an intelligence and executive officer for the coastguard, they moved to London. She now lives in south California with her husband and three daughters. She has a Bachelor of Arts degree in French.

== Awards ==
- 1995 - Romantic Times Award Nominee for Glenlyon's Bride
- 1997 - Romantic Times Award Nominee for Fairy Tale
- 1998 - Romantic Times Career Achievement Award for Historical Love and Laughter
- 1998 - Romantic Times Award Nominee for Daring
- 1999 - Romantic Times Award Nominee for Delight
- 2000 - Romantic Times Award Nominee for Indiscretion
- 2001 - Romantic Times Award Nominee for Abandon
- 2006 - Romantic Times Award Nominee for The Wicked Games of a Gentleman
- 2008 - Romantic Times Award Winner for Wicked as Sin

== Bibliography ==
=== Boscastle Family ===
- The Seduction of an English Scoundrel (Grayson, Jane), 2005
- The Love Affair of an English Lord (Dominic, Chloe), 2005
- The Wedding Night of an English Rogue (Heath, Julia), 2005
- The Wicked Games of a Gentleman (Drake, Eloise) , 2006
- The Sinful Nights of a Nobleman (Devon, Jocelyn) , 2006
- The Devilish Pleasures of a Duke (Adrian, Emma), 2007
- Wicked As Sin (Gabriel, Alethea), 2008
- A Wicked Lord at the Wedding (Sebastien, Eleanor), 2009
- The Wicked Duke Takes a Wife (Griffin, Harriet), 2009
- A Duke's Temptation (Samuel, Lily), 2010
- A Bride Unveiled (Kit, Violet), 2011
- The Duchess Diaries (Gideon, Charlotte), 2012
- The Mistress Memoirs (Colin, Kate), 2013
- The Countess Confessions (Damien, Emily), 2014

=== Other Historicals ===
- Heart of the Storm, 1985
- Shadow of Splendor, 1987
- Tiger Dance, 1991
- A Deeper Magic, 1994
- Glenlyon's Bride, 1995
- Fairy Tale, 1997
- Daring, 1998
- Delight, 1998
- Indiscretion, 2000
- Abandon, 2001
- The Husband Hunt, 2002

=== Anthologies ===
- Under the Boardwalk, 1999
