= Hannah Amelia Wright =

American physician

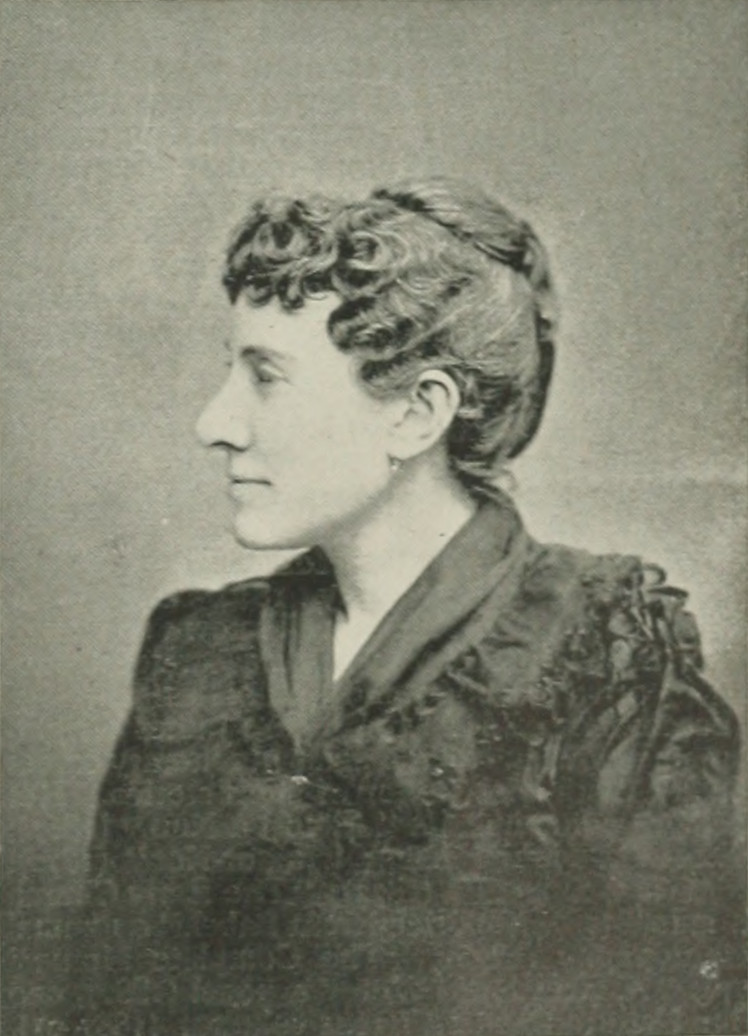
Hannah Amelia Wright

Hannah Amelia Wright (1836–1924) was an American physician, and the first female doctor to be appointed as an examiner in a state asylum.

== Early life and family ==
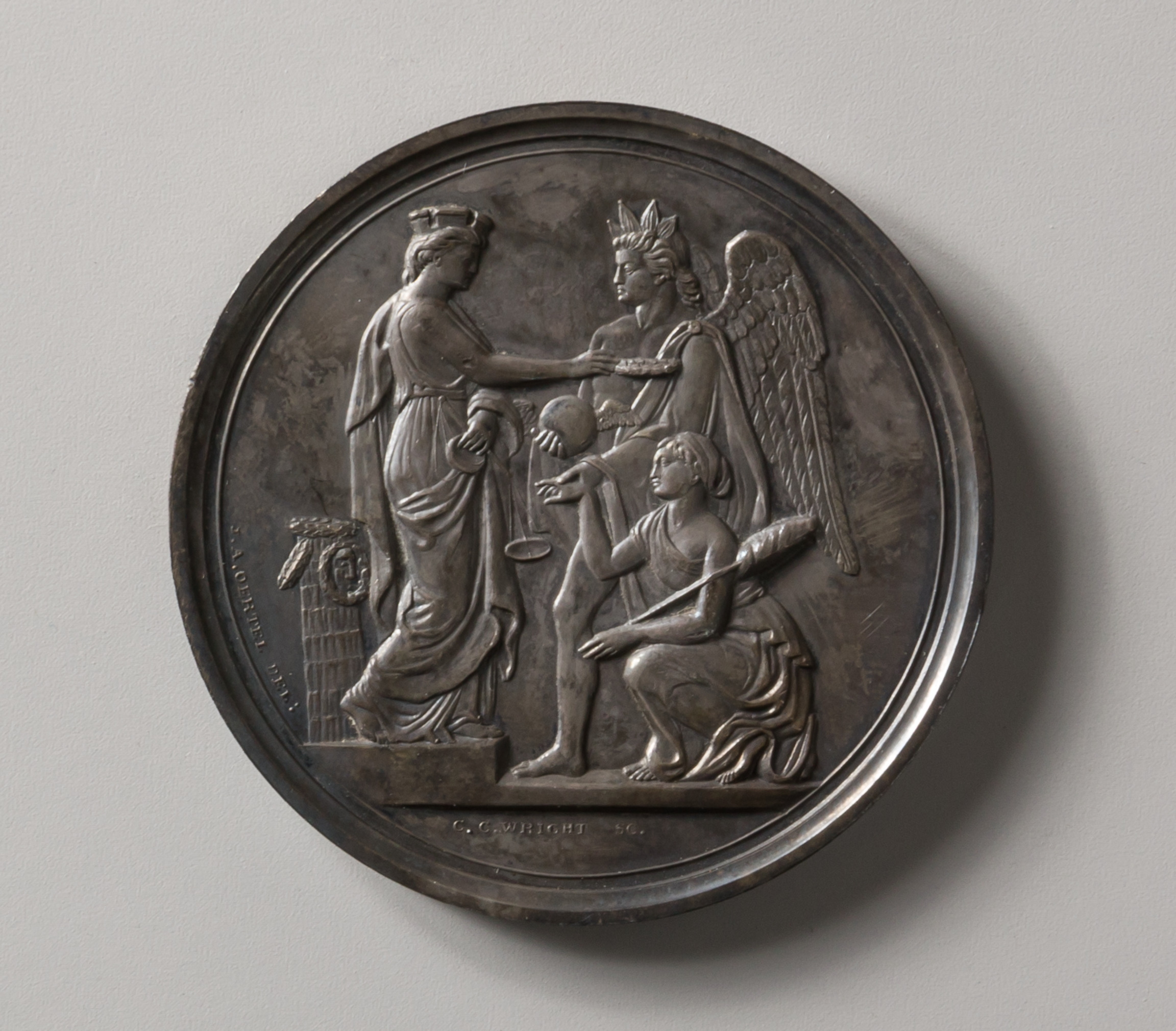
First International Exhibition in America Opened in Crystal Palace, New York, by Charles Cushing Wright (1796–1854)

Hannah Amelia Wright was born in New York City on August 18, 1836. She was the daughter of engraver and medalist Charles Cushing Wright (1796–1854) and Lavinia Delliber (died July 6, 1860), a Huguenot from Charleston, South Carolina.

Hannah received her education at home. Until her thirteenth year, she lived in Louisiana but returned to New York in 1849.

== Career ==
Wright began an independent career by writing fiction. Her stories were published, but she turned her attention to music.

In 1860 Wright obtained a position as teacher of music in the New York Institute for the Blind. After eleven years teaching, she was preparing to go abroad to study music, when she became interested in the care of the insane. She decided to study medicine.

In 1871 Wright entered the New York Medical College for Women and graduated in 1874. She organized the college's alumni association serving for several years as its secretary and afterward as its presiding officer. Shortly after graduation, Wright tried for a position in one of the State asylums for the insane as an assistant physician, but she was refused the position twice on the contention that women were not eligible. In 1878 Wright obtained the position of "examiner in lunacy", being the first woman to be appointed in that role.

Wright was successful, establishing a large and remunerative practice. Realizing the necessity for women physicians in the field of gynecology, she devoted herself to that branch of the practice of medicine as a specialist.

== Affiliations and memberships ==
In 1878 Wright was made a trustee of the New York Medical College for Women. While serving as secretary of the board of trustees, she used her influence to establish women in the chairs of that college, and it was mainly through her determination and perseverance that women succeeded men as professors in that institution.

In 1882 Wright helped to found the Society for Promoting the Welfare of the Insane and for many years covered the role of president. She was a member of the Medico-Legal Society, the Woman's Legal Education Society, the State and County Homeopathic Medical Societies, and the American Obstetrical Society.

== Personal life ==
Wright died in 1924 and is buried at Warwick Cemetery, Warwick, New York.
