= Sergey Skolskiy =

Russian powerlifter

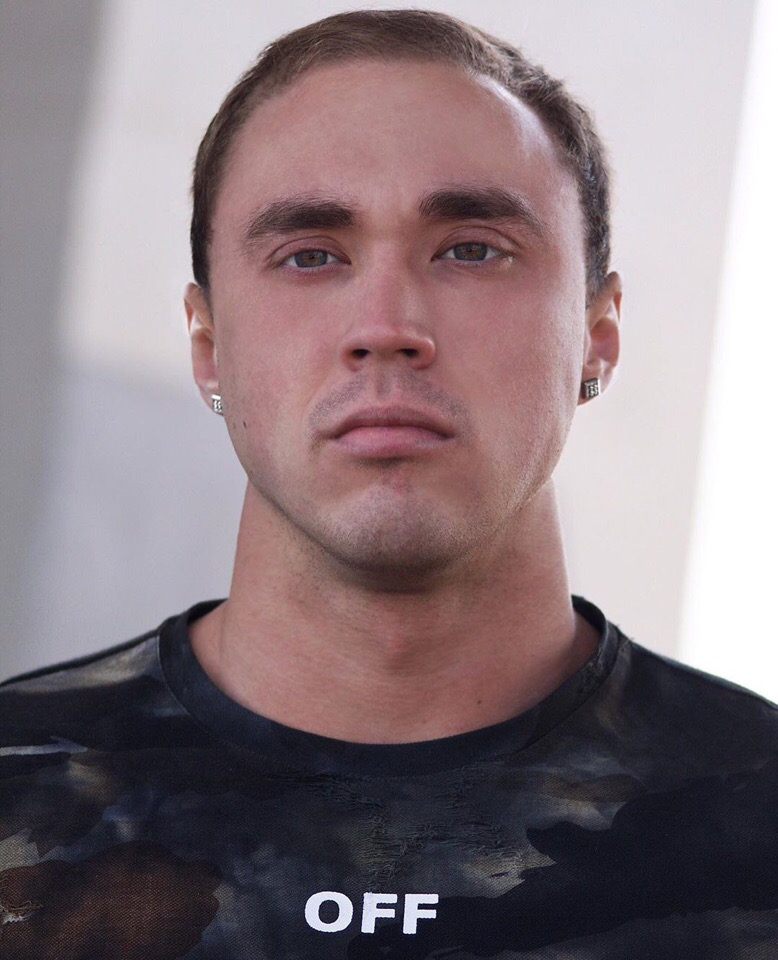
- Sergey Skolskiy in 2020
- Born: Sergey Vladimirovich Skolskiy; 6 October 1995 (age 30); Yoshkar-Ola, Mari El Republic, Russia
- Height: 6 ft 0 in (183 cm) weight 99kg

Sergey Vladimirovich Skolskiy (Russian: Серге́й Влади́мирович Ско́льский; born 6 October 1995) is a Russian powerlifter, Master of Sports of Russia, champion of Russia, four-time European champion in the open category, two-time world champion, 16-time a Guinness world record holder.

== Biography ==
Sergey Skolskiy was born in the Republic of Mari El in the city of Yoshkar-Ola, where he first got acquainted with sports at the age of 6. He started playing football at the Spartak children's club. He worked there until he was 13, after which decided to go to the track and Sport of athletics, after a couple of months of training he won the championship of the city of Yoshkar-Ola and the Republic of Mari El in the distance of 100 and 200 meters. After the unsuccessful Russian athletics championship, Sergey decided to give up this sport and try himself in cross-country skiing as he liked to ski. There was a gym in the section, where skiers carried out general physical training. As a 15-year-old boy, Sergey felt himself the strongest against the background of his colleagues, he was interested in working with iron. Gradually he began to immerse himself in sports literature and anatomy. For a day he read various articles and forums on the Internet. Realizing that it would be impossible to sit on 2 chairs, he decided to completely go for Powerlifting in order to achieve high results. At the age of 17 he graduated from Secondary School No.6 in his hometown in 2013, then moved to Saint Petersburg and entered a higher educational institution of Saint Petersburg State Institute of Technology in the period from 2013 to 2018, at the Department of Financier. In parallel with his studies, he devoted himself to training and competitions in powerlifting. He is currently active in his social networks, consults people around the world and conducts seminars.

== Education ==
He graduated from secondary school No.6 in his hometownin the city of Yoshkar-Ola in 2013, then moved to St. Petersburg, where he graduated higher educational institution Saint Petersburg State Institute of Technology from 2013 to 2018

== Personal life ==
Parents Skolskaya Irina Ilinichna (born March 9, 1969) and Skolskiy Vladimir Yaroslavovich (born November 21, 1970) are individual entrepreneurs.

Since 2022, he has been married to Olga Skolskaya (born January 23, 1988), a professional bodyfitness athlete. They have two children.

== Anthropometric data ==
Height - 183 cm

Weight - 99 kg with 10% fat

Hand - 45 cm

Hip - 72 cm

Waist - 75 cm

Buttocks - 118 cm

== Achievements ==
Sergey Skolskiy participated in the following powerlifting contests

=== Performances in 2012 ===
Championship of Yoshkar-Ola:

- boys absolute, 1st place

championship of the Republic of Mari El:

- boys absolute, 1st place

=== Performances in 2013 ===
Russian championship:

- men up to 90 kg, 2st place

Championship of St. Petersburg:

- men up to 90 kg, 1st place

=== Performances in 2014 ===
Russian championship:

- men up to 90 kg, 1st place

=== Performances in 2017 ===
Championship of St. Petersburg and the Leningrad Region:

- men up to 100 kg, 1st place.

Open Cup Eastern Europe:

- men up to 100 kg, 1st place
- juniors up to 100 kg, absolute, 1st place

=== Performances in 2019 ===
Europe championship

- men up to 100 kg, 2st place
- juniors up to 100 kg, absolute, 2st place

European Cup

- men up to 90 kg, 1st place
- juniors up to 90 kg, absolute, 1st place

Eastern European Cup

- men up to 90 kg, 1st place
- men up to 90 kg, absolute, 1st place

World Championship

- men up to 90 kg, with doping control, 1st place
- men up to 90 kg, absolute with doping control, 1st place
- men up to 90 kg Pro, 1st place
- men up to 90 kg, absolute Pro, 2st place

=== Personal results ===
- Squat (exercise) — 355 кг.
- Bench press — 180 кг.
- Deadlift — 280 кг.
- The best result in the total eventing (powerlifting) - 885 kg (in juniors).
- World record holder among young men in squats with a barbell in equipment - 355 kg.
