= Hannah Diaz =

American soccer player

Personal information
- Full name: Hannah Victoria Diaz
- Date of birth: February 17, 1996 (age 30)
- Place of birth: Hidden Valley Lake, California, U.S.
- Height: 5 ft 6 in (1.68 m)
- Positions: Midfielder; forward

Team information
- Current team: Stockton Cargo
- Number: 22

College career
Years	Team	Apps	(Gls)
2014–2017	Saint Mary's Gaels	79	(24)

Senior career*
Years	Team	Apps	(Gls)
2018	Orca Kamogawa	16	(4)
2018–2019	Lille OSC	7	(3)
2019–2021	FC Fleury 91	27	(0)
2021–2022	Houston Dash	2	(0)
2023–2024	Orca Kamogawa		
2024–	Stockton Cargo	13	(7)
- * Club domestic league appearances and goals as of May 12, 2025

Hannah Victoria Diaz (born February 17, 1996) is an American professional soccer player who plays as a forward for Orca Kamogawa FC of the Nadeshiko League.

== College career ==
Diaz played for Saint Mary's Gaels women's soccer team from 2014 to 2017.

== Club career ==
Diaz signed for Houston Dash in July 2021. She was waived in April 2022.
