= Hannah Jones =

Hannah Jones may refer to:

- Hannah Jones (Lancashire cricketer) (born 1999), English cricketer who plays for Lancashire and North West Thunder
- Hannah Jones (Surrey cricketer) (born 1999), English cricketer who plays for Surrey and South East Stars
- Hannah Jones (snooker player) (born 1996), British snooker player
- Hannah Jones (singer), British singer
- Hannah Maria Jones (c. 1784–1854), Victorian novelist
- Hannah M. Jones, American artist and musician
- Hannah Vaughan Jones, British journalist and presenter
- Hannah Jones (rugby union) (born 1996), Welsh rugby union player
- Hannah Jones (hurdler) (born 1995), Australian hurdler
- Hannah Jones, a recurring character in the American television series 12 Monkeys

== See also ==
- Nikole Hannah-Jones, American journalist
