= Hannah Kigusiuq =

Inuk artist

- Born: 1931; Hanningajuq (Garry Lake), Northwest Territories (now Nunavut)
- Died: 1995 (aged 63–64)
- Known for: Graphic arts

Hannah Kigusiuq (1931-1995) was an Inuk artist known for her drawings and prints.

Kigusiuq was born near Hanningajuq (Garry Lake), Northwest Territories (now Nunavut). In the 1950s, her husband Kuuk was afflicted with tuberculosis and the couple relocated to Baker Lake for medical treatment. She began to draw after encouragement from local crafts officer Boris Kotelewitz as a way to supplement her income while her husband received further treatment outside of Baker Lake.

Her work is included in the collections of the National Gallery of Canada, the Winnipeg Art Gallery, the Musée national des beaux-arts du Québec and the McMichael Canadian Art Collection.
