= Hannah Cowley =

Hannah Cowley may refer to:

- Hannah Cowley (writer) (1743–1809), English playwright and poet
- Hannah Cowley (actress) (born 1981), British actress and director
