= Hannah Éva =

American model, artist and internet personality

Hannah Éva Hofmann
- Born: April 26, 1993 (age 33); Rochester, Minnesota, United States
- Occupations: Model, artist, internet personality
- Years active: 2011–present

Hannah Éva Hofmann (born April 26, 1993) is an American model, artist, and internet personality. She has dual-citizenship for Hungary and the United States. Originally from Eagan, MN, she lives in Minneapolis, Minnesota, and is best known for her videos posted on Vine. As of March 22, 2015, Hofmann has approximately 8,200 followers on Vine.

== Early life ==
Hofmann was born in Rochester, Minnesota, and grew up in Eagan, Minnesota. She attended Itasca Community College, with a focus on art and writing.

== Career ==
=== Art ===
Hofmann received multiple national awards for art and photography while in high school including the 2011 Scholastic Art & Writing Award Gold Medal in Photography.

=== Internet videos ===
Hannah Éva Hofmann joined Vine in September, 2013, when she created an account under the name of "Hannah Eva". Since then, Hofmann has focused more on Vines containing artistic and comedic content, including cosplay in the Disney universe. One of her most popular Vines showcases Hofmann's artistic prowess, in which her face in skull make-up with special effect editing done to her eyes is shown on a black backdrop.

=== Modeling ===
In addition to creating her own content, Hofmann has also worked with multiple photographers in the greater-Minneapolis area to create a modeling portfolio.
