= Hannah Arnold =

Hannah Arnold may refer to:

- Hannah Arnold (née Waterman) (c. 1705–1758), mother of Benedict Arnold
- Hannah Arnold (beauty queen) (born 1996), Filipino-Australian model and beauty pageant titleholder
