= Hannah Davis =

Hannah Davis may refer to:

- Hannah E. Davis, American data scientist and long COVID researcher
- Hannah Davis (canoeist) (born 1985), Australian Olympic bronze medalist
- Hannah Pearl Davis (born 1996), American social media personality and political commentator
- Hannah Jeter (née Davis, born 1990), American model and television host
- Hannah Lux Davis (born 1986), American music video and film director

== See also ==
- Hannah Davison (born 1997), American soccer player
- New Hampshire Historical Marker No. 13: Hannah Davis – Amos Fortune
