= Hannah Cross (barrister) =

English barrister, part of General Council of the Bar (1938-1945)

Hannah Cross (25 April 1908 – 19 January 2008) was an English barrister. She was the first woman to become a member of the General Council of the Bar serving from 1938 to 1945.

== Early life ==
Cross was the daughter of Francis Cross (died 1950) and his wife Eleanor (née Phillimore) (died 1949). Her father was a barrister and her maternal grandfather was the judge Walter Phillimore, 1st Baron Phillimore. Her brother, Michael, served in the Royal Naval Volunteer Reserve and married a great-granddaughter of Augustus Edward Hobart-Hampden, 6th Earl of Buckinghamshire.

She was educated at Downe House School in Berkshire. She graduated St Hilda's College, Oxford with a BA First Class in Philosophy, Politics and Economics in 1929.

== Career ==
She was called to the bar at Lincoln's Inn in 1931 and became a tenant at 1 New Square Chambers.

Cross continued to practice law under her maiden name after she was married. In 1935 she was one of only 12 female members of the Chancery Bar Association (out of 207), and in 1938 she was the first woman to join the committee. She also became the first female member of the Bar Council in 1938, remaining a member until 1945.

== Family ==
She married fellow barrister Edmund Gordon Wright in 1936. They had two children; a son and a daughter.

Her husband served in the fire service in London during the Second World War. She was involved in civil defence during the war.

Her husband died in 1971. She died in Chichester in 2008.
