= Hannah Quinn-Mulligan =

Irish Journalist

- Born: 9 February 1990 (age 36)
- Occupation: Journalist

Hannah Quinn-Mulligan (born 9 February 1990) is an Irish farmer and journalist. She has worked for the BBC, RTÉ and The Irish Times and in 2020 won three awards at Ireland's Guild of Agricultural Journalism Awards.

== Early life and education ==
Hannah Quinn-Mulligan grew up on a beef farm with pedigree Hereford cattle with her mother and grandmother in County Limerick. Her double barrel surname is a combination of her mother's and father's second names. She graduated from Trinity College, Dublin with a degree in Philosophy and Modern Irish, and has a master's degree from the University of Limerick as well as a qualification in agriculture from Pallaskenry Agricultural College.

== Career ==
Following her master's degree, Quinn-Mulligan was one of 12 people picked out of 4,500 applicants for the BBC's gold-standard production trainee program in 2014 and began working in London across radio and TV, and remained working with the BBC for several years. She presented and produced a number of radio documentaries and presented the farming show on BBC Radio Ulster.

Quinn-Mulligan regularly features as a guest and reporter on a number of RTÉ shows, including RTÉ CountryWide. In March 2022, she presented and produced her first radio documentary for RTÉ on the life of St Patrick.

She is fluent in Irish and has featured in both Irish and English-speaking TV documentaries on RTÉ.

Quinn-Mulligan has written extensively for The Irish Times, focusing on agricultural stories including animal feed shortages and water quality.

Quinn-Mulligan was the first to break the story of COVID-19 in meat factories and covered the issue extensively throughout the pandemic. As part of her work in the area, she uncovered serious tax and payment issues for migrant workers, which was later picked up by RTÉ Primetime.

In September 2021, Quinn-Mulligan set up the Women in Agriculture Stakeholders Group (WASG). The group is voluntary and as chairperson she brought together representatives from each Irish farm organization to campaign together for support for female farmers. Quinn-Mulligan leads the group in an appearance before the Joint Oireachtas Agricultural Committee and in meetings with Junior Minister for Agriculture Martin Heydon and in meetings with the Department of Agriculture. The group succeeded in securing a higher rate of sheds and machinery grants for Irish female farmers in the Common Agricultural Policy 2023 – 2027.

Quinn-Mulligan is also a long-term judge on the Farming for Nature panel.

== Awards ==
Quinn-Mulligan has won several awards for her work as a journalist. She won an IMRO radio award for her Farm Diary series, which she presented and produced with her grandmother on their farm in Limerick. During her time with the Irish Farmers Journal, she also won four national agricultural journalism awards, including best news articles, rising star, and best feature article, which she wrote with her then colleague Lorcan Allen. As a result of their work, the pair won the overall national agricultural journalist award, nicknamed ‘The Bull’.
