= Hannah Forster (activist) =

Gambian human rights activist

- Born: Twentieth century
- Education: University of Ghana; Loughborough University; Sant'Anna School of Advanced Studies
- Occupation: Human rights activist

Hannah J. Forster (born in the late 1950s) is a Gambian human rights activist.

== Life ==
Forster attended St. Joseph's Preparatory School and St. Joseph's High School.

After working in an office job for a short time, she worked for the Gambian National Library. She then graduated from the University of Ghana with a degree in library science and then graduated from Loughborough University in Great Britain with a bachelor's degree in library and information science. At the Sant'Anna School of Advanced Studies, she obtained a master's degree in Human Rights and Conflict Management.

From around 1990 she worked at the African Center for Democracy and Human Rights Studies (ACDHRS). After the sudden death of Zoe Tembo, she was appointed director of the institute on March 12, 2001. She was the longest serving employee at the time of appointment. Until she took over this post, she was President of the Gambia Library and Information Service, which is responsible for the Gambia National Library.

In addition to her work at the ACDHRS, she is involved in several other organizations. From 2006 she was chair of the African Democracy Forum and is a member of the steering committee of the World Movement for Democracy and a member of the Council for a Community of Democracies and Solidarity for African Women's Rights (SOAWR). From 1992 to 2009 she was a consultant for Human Rights Information and Documentation Systems (HURIDOCS). From 2004 to 2010 she also taught courses at the Center for Human Rights of the University of Pretoria.

In 2007 she received the International Women of Courage Award from the US State Department, presented to her by the American Ambassador to Gambia, Joseph D. Stafford.

Forster is married and has children.
