= Hannah Anderson =

Hannah Anderson may refer to:

- Hannah Anderson (soccer) (born 2001), American soccer player
- Hannah Emily Anderson, Canadian actress
- Kidnapping of Hannah Anderson, 2013 kidnapping case

== See also ==
- Hanna Andersson, American clothing company
