= Hannah James =

Hannah James may refer to:

- Hannah James (musician), English folk musician
- Hannah James (tennis), British tennis player, see Aberdeen Cup
- Hannah James (actress), British–American actress
