= Hannah Roberts =

Hannah Roberts may refer to:

- Hannah Roberts (Miss Mississippi) (born 1993)
- Hannah Roberts (BMX cyclist) (born 2001)
- Hannah Roberts (cellist)

== See also ==
- Anna Roberts (born 1957), Canadian politician
