= Hannah Smith =

Hannah Smith may refer to:

- Hannah Smith (bowls) (born 1987), Welsh bowler
- Hannah Smith (rugby union) (born 1992), Scottish rugby player
- Hannah Clayson Smith, American lawyer
- Hannah Whitall Smith (1832–1911), American writer and activist
