= H. Rea Woodman =

American writer and educator

Hannah Rea Woodman (February 10, 1870 – 1951) was an American writer and educator.

A native of Jacksonville, Illinois, Woodman was the daughter of William Clayton Woodman and his wife. Soon after her birth, the family moved to Wichita, Kansas, where her family home served as the first hotel in the city. At the age of three Hannah was captured by the Arapaho; William Mathewson assisted in her return. Woodman went on to attend Garfield University before finishing her bachelor's degree at Drake University and receiving a master's degree from the University of Kansas; she also engaged in graduate work at the University of Nebraska and the University of Minnesota. A member of Phi Beta Kappa, she taught for a time at a variety of institutions, embarking at the same time upon a writing career. In 1927 she returned to Wichita, passing the rest of her life teaching privately while continuing to write. She worked in a variety of genres, producing plays, poems, and essays. Woodman died in Wichita, and is buried there at Maple Grove Cemetery.

Woodman is the namesake of Rea Woodman Elementary School in Wichita, opened in January 1956. Many of her manuscripts are held in the collection of the Kansas Historical Society alongside other printed material from her career.
