= Hannah Fielding =

Egyptian writer

- Born: Alexandria, Egypt
- Education: French Literature at Alexandria University
- Alma mater: St Joseph de Lion, Minia, Upper Egypt; Notre Dame de Sion, Alexandria, Egypt; Mlle Narguiledgian Finishing School and Business School For Young Ladies, Geneva, Switzerland
- Website: http://www.hannahfielding.net

Hannah Fielding is a contemporary Romance fiction writer. Her second book, The Echoes of Love, won a 2014 Gold IPPY Award for Romance and the Silver Medal for Romance at the 2014 Foreword Reviews IndieFab Book Awards, a paid vanity award. Her third novel, Indiscretion, was named the Gold Winner in the Fiction: Romance Category of the 2015 USA Best Book Awards. It also won Gold at the 2016 Benjamin Franklin Awards. Indiscretion is the first novel in the Andalucian Nights Trilogy. The second part, Masquerade, was published in 2015 as well, and the third part, "Legacy" was published in summer 2016.

== Publications ==
- Burning Embers. 2012. ISBN 9780992994310.
- The Echoes of Love. 2014. ISBN 9780992671822.
- Indiscretion. The Andalucian Nights Trilogy. 2015. ISBN 9780992671891.
- Masquerade. The Andalucian Nights Trilogy. 2015. ISBN 9780992994372.
- Legacy. The Andalucian Nights Trilogy. 2016. ISBN 9780993291739.
- Aphrodite's Tears. 2018. ISBN 9780995566767.
- Concerto. 2019. ISBN 9781916489516.
- Song of the Nile. 2021. ISBN 9788395689253.

== Awards ==
- 2021, American Fiction Award: Romance Category, Song of the Nile
- The Echoes of Love won the Gold Medal for Romance at the 2014 Independent Publisher Book Awards as well as the Silver Medal for Romance at the 2014 Foreword Reviews IndieFab Book Awards.
- Indiscretion, Gold Winner in the Fiction: Romance Category of the 2015 USA Best Book Awards. Indiscretion also won Gold and Masquerade Silver for Romance at the 2016 Benjamin Franklin Awards.
- Aphrodite's Tears won Best Romance at the International Book Awards, the National Indie Excellence Awards, the American Fiction Awards and the NABE Pinnacle Book Achievement Awards.
