= Mindy Skolsky =

American children's writer

- Born: 1924 or 1925
- Died: 2005
- Education: University of Albany
- Occupation: children's writer

Mindy Warshaw Skolsky (1924 or 1925 – 2005) was an American children's writer. She is known for her "Hannah" children's book series.

She graduated from the University of Albany with a Bachelor of Arts degree in English in 1947 and worked as a teacher.

Skolsky's "Hannah" series is aimed at primary- and middle-school children. The books talk about a little girl named Hannah Diamond, who lives at her family's restaurant near Nyack, New York, at the time of the Great Depression. Skolsky herself grew up in the Hudson Valley during those times.

== Bibliography ==
- The Whistling Teakettle and Other Stories About Hannah (1977)
- Carnival and Kopeck and More About Hannah (1979)
- Hannah Is a Palindrome (1980) – reissued as Welcome to the Grand View, Hannah!
- Hannah and the Best Father on Route 9W (1982) – reissued as You're the Best, Hannah!
- Love from Your Friend, Hannah (1998)
- Hannah and the Whistling Teakettle (2000, picture book)
