= List of named storms (H) =

Storms are named for historical reasons to avoid confusion when communicating with the public, as more than one storm can exist at a time. Names are drawn in order from predetermined lists. For tropical cyclones, names are assigned when a system has one-, three-, or ten-minute winds of more than 65 km/h (40 mph). Standards, however, vary from basin to basin. For example, some tropical depressions are named in the Western Pacific, while within the Australian and Southern Pacific regions, the naming of tropical cyclones are delayed until they have gale-force winds occurring more than halfway around the storm center.

This list covers the letter H.

== Storms ==
Note: † indicates the name was retired after that usage in the respective basin

- Habana (2021) – a Category 4 tropical cyclone that stayed out at sea; caused no damage.
- Hagibis

- 2002 – a category 5 super typhoon that never affected land.
- 2007 – traversed the Philippines twice.
- 2014 – a tropical storm that, along with the southwest monsoon, brought heavy rainfall to the Philippines for nearly a week in June 2014.
- 2019† – a long-lived and violent Category 5 super typhoon that caused widespread destruction in Japan.

- Hagupit

- 2002 — made landfall west of Macau.
- 2008 — a powerful cyclone that caused widespread destruction along its path in September 2008.
- 2014 — a Category 5 super typhoon that traversed the Philippines.
- 2020 – a Category 1 typhoon that impacted Eastern China and South Korea.
- 2026 – a weak tropical storm that minimally affected Yap.

- Haikui

- 2012 – a Category 1 typhoon that made landfall in Zhejiang, China.
- 2017 – a weak storm that traversed the Philippine archipelagos of Luzon and Visayas.
- 2023† – a Category 3 typhoon that made landfall in Taiwan, becoming the first storm to make landfall in Taiwan in nearly 4 years.

- Haima

- 2004 – made landfall south of Shanghai.
- 2011 – made landfall, first in Zhanjiang, Guangdong, China, and later in landfall over Hanoi, Vietnam.
- 2016† – a powerful category 5 super typhoon that made landfall in Peñablanca, Cagayan of the Philippines and in Haifeng County, Shanwei in the Guangdong province of China.

- Haishen

- 2002 – a category 2 typhoon that did not affect land.
- 2008 – a short lived tropical storm that formed off the Coast of Japan.
- 2015 – churned in the open sea.
- 2020 – a Category 4 super typhoon that moved through the Ryukyu Islands of Japan, and later made landfall in Ulsan, South Korea, then in South Hamgyong Province, North Korea.
- 2026 – a short lived tropical storm that is unrecognized by the Joint Typhoon Warning Center.

- Haitang

- 2005 - struck both Taiwan and China.
- 2011 – meandered in the South China Sea.
- 2017 - both struck Taiwan and China a day after Typhoon Nesat made a landfall.
- 2022 — churned in the open ocean.

- Haiyan

- 2001 – a 2001 pacific typhoon season that hit Taiwan and Ryukyu Islands.
- 2007 – a tropical cyclone initially showing subtropical characteristics.
- 2013† – an extremely powerful and deadly Category 5-equivalent super typhoon that caused catastrophic destruction in the Philippines, causing at least 6,300 deaths.

- Hal

- 1978† – traversed the Cape York Peninsula in Australia and later the North Island in New Zealand.
- 1985 – made landfall northeast of Hong Kong.
- 1988 – remained over the open ocean.

- Hale (2023) – a weak tropical depression, that passed near New Caledonia did not cause serious damage.
- Haleh (2019) – a Category 4 intense tropical cyclone without affecting any landmass.
- Haley (2013) – remained over the open ocean.
- Hali (1999) – a Category 3 severe tropical cyclone that minimal affected Cook Islands.
- Halima (2022) – a Category 4 intense tropical cyclone without affecting any landmass.
- Hallie

- 1966 – made landfall in Mexico as a weakening tropical storm.
- 1975 – paralleled near the coast of the southeastern United States before dissipating.

- Halola (2015) – a small but long-lived tropical cyclone in July 2015 that traveled 7,640 km (4,750 mi) across the Pacific Ocean, and made landfall over Kyushu as a tropical storm.
- Halong

- 2002 –passed just south of Guam one week after Typhoon Chataan struck the island and left heavy damage, and struck Japan since tropical storm.
- 2008 – a Category 1 typhoon that made landfall in the Philippines.
- 2014 – a Category 5 super typhoon that caused heavy rain in the Philippines and struck Japan.
- 2019 – Category 5 super typhoon that remained out to sea; strongest cyclone worldwide in 2019.
- 2025 – a Category 4 typhoon passed near the coast of Japan.

- Hamish

- 1999 – did not make landfall.
- 2009† – a severe tropical cyclone that caused extensive damage to the Great Barrier Reef and coastal Queensland, Australia, in 2009 that also caused two fatalities.

- Hamoon (2023) – a Category 2 tropical cyclone that made landfall in Bangladesh.
- Hanna

- 2002 – a storm that made landfall in the United States.
- 2007 – a deadly tropical storm that affected both Philippines and Vietnam; also known as Lekima beyond the PAR.
- 2008 – Category 1 hurricane that caused over 500 deaths in Haiti before traveling up the eastern U.S. coast in September 2008.
- 2011 – churned in the open ocean; also known as Tokage beyond the PAR.
- 2014 – formed from the remnants of Tropical Storm Trudy from the East Pacific, dissipated, then reorganized, and made landfall in Nicaragua.
- 2015 – Category 5 super typhoon, had severe impacts in the Northern Mariana Islands, Taiwan, and eastern China; also known as Soudelor beyond the PAR.
- 2019 – Category 4 super typhoon, caused destruction to East China; also known as Lekima beyond the PAR.
- * 2020 – a Category 1 hurricane that made landfall in Texas; also the earliest-forming eighth named storm of an Atlantic hurricane season.
- 2023 – a Category 3 typhoon that made landfall in Taiwan and South China; also known as Haikui beyond the PAR.
- 2026 – weak tropical storm that did not affect land.

- Hannah

- 1947 – Japan Meteorological Agency analyzed it as a tropical depression, not as a tropical storm.
- 1959 – a strong hurricane that was only a threat to shipping.
- 1972 – a Category 3 severe tropical cyclone that impact Papua New Guinea.
- 1997 – Japan Meteorological Agency analyzed it as a tropical depression, not as a tropical.

- Harold

- 1997 – a strong category 2 tropical cyclone (Australian scale) minimal impact New Caledonia.
- 2020† – a category 5 severe tropical cyclone that caused widespread destruction in the Solomon Islands, Vanuatu, Fiji and Tonga in 2020 and resulting in 30 fatalities.
- 2023 – made landfall in southern Texas, brought needed rainfall to the Rio Grande watershed.

- Harriet

- 1952 – Category 3-equivalent typhoon that hit China.
- 1956 – struck Japan.
- 1959 – hit the Eastern Philippines as a Category 4-equivalent typhoon.
- 1962 – hit Thailand, crossed into the North Indian Ocean where it hit East Pakistan.
- 1964 made landfall on Madagascar.
- 1965 – hit Taiwan as a Category 3-equivalent typhoon.
- 1967 – remained over the open ocean.
- 1971 – traversed the Philippines, made landfall near the demilitarized zone between North and South Vietnam as a Category 4-equivalent typhoon.
- 1977 – remained over the open ocean.
- 1982 – remained over the open ocean.
- 1992 – passed just south of North Keeling Island, strengthened into a Category 5 on the Australian tropical cyclone intensity scale, then crossed into the South-West Indian Ocean.
- 2003 – affected Western Australia.

- Harry

- 1976 – a Category 2 tropical cyclone passed north of the Cocos Islands.
- 1989† – a Category 4 severe tropical cyclone that made landfall New Caledonia.
- 1991 – a weak tropical storm that made landfall Japan.
- 1994 – a weak tropical storm affected Philippines, South China and North Vietnam.

- Harurot (2003)† – a powerful Category 4 typhoon that made strucked Philippines and South China.
- Harvey

- 1981 – powerful Category 4 hurricane that stayed out at sea; caused no damage
- 1984 – remained over the open ocean.
- 1993 – stayed out at sea
- 1999 – a moderately strong system that caused flooding across South Florida
- February (2005)† – Category 3 cyclone that affected Queensland and Northern Territory
- August (2005) – then-earliest eighth named storm since record-keeping began; surpassed by Hanna in 2020
- 2011 – last out of eight systems that failed to reach hurricane intensity in 2011; affected the Yucatán Peninsula as a tropical storm
- 2017† – powerful Category 4 hurricane that caused catastrophic flooding in Texas; tied with Katrina as the costliest Atlantic hurricane on record.

- Hattie

- 1961† – a Category 5 hurricane that made landfall south of Belize City.
- 1990 – the fifth tropical cyclone of a record-six to hit Japan during the 1990.
- 1993 – remained over the open ocean.

- Hayley (2025) – a Category 4 tropical cyclone that made landfall in the Western Australia.
- Hazel

- 1948 – a strong typhoon causes damage in Taiwan and East China.
- 1953 – a Category 1 hurricane causes minor damage in Florida.
- 1954† – killed over 1000 people in Haiti, caused damage and death from South Carolina to Ontario.
- 1963 – was downgraded after the fact; it never warranted a name.
- 1964 – affected Madagascar.
- 1965† – a weak east Pacific tropical cyclone that caused heavy damage in Mexico.
- 1979 – a powerful tropical cyclone caused $41 million in damage, among the costliest Western Australian cyclones.

- Hazen (1981)† – a Category 3 typhoon that made landfall Philippines and South China.
- Heather

- 1969 – never affected land.
- 1973 – a weak tropical storm caused no deaths or damage to any location in the coastal area of the Gulf of Tehuantepec.
- 1977 – one of the worst tropical cyclones to affect Arizona on record.
- 1992 – passed just south of North Keeling Island, strengthened into a Category 5 on the Australian tropical cyclone intensity scale, then crossed into the South-West Indian Ocean.

- Hector

- 1978 – a category 4 hurricane.
- 1982 – a category 1 hurricane.
- 1986 – caused significant flooding in western Australia
- 1988 – a category 4 hurricane strongest of its season.
- 1994 – a tropical storm that affected the Baja California Peninsula.
- 2000 – a Category 1 hurricane whose remnants affected Hawaii.
- 2006 – a Category 2 hurricane that did not affect land.
- 2012 – a tropical storm that affected Southwestern Mexico
- 2018 – a long-lived and strong Category 4 hurricane that crossed into the Western Pacific as a minimal tropical storm.
- 2024 – a tropical storm that did not affect land.

- Heidi

- 1967 – never affected land.
- 1967 – a strong tropical storm did not directly cause any fatalities or severe damage.
- 2012† – a small and moderately-powerful tropical cyclone that struck Western Australia in January 2012.

- Helen

- 1945 – a category 3 typhoon struck Taiwan and China.
- 1954 – Category 1 typhoon approached the coast of Japan without causing significant damage.
- 1958 – a powerful category 5 typhoon made landfall Japan.
- 1961 – a category 2 typhoon impact Japan and Korea.
- 1964 – a powerful category 4 typhoon weakened a tropical storm and made landfall near Dalian in Liaoning.
- 1966 – a strong tropical storm made landfall Japan.
- 1969 – never affected land.
- 1972 – the most destructive tropical cyclone to strike Japan during the 1972 Pacific typhoon season.
- 1974 – formed off the coast of Western Australia moving mostly west, no significant damage.
- 1975 – a weak tropical storm hit Philippines and Vietnam.
- 1992 – never affected land.
- 1995 – a Category 1 typhoon made landfall northeast of Hong Kong brought many landslides and flooding.
- 2004 – a powerful typhoon that struck southeastern Japan during the 2004 Pacific typhoon season.
- 2007† – A Category 2 tropical cyclone that hit the Northern Territory in 2008 causing one fatality.
- 2008 – the seventh named storm and the fifth typhoon that was recognised by the Japan Meteorological Agency.
- 2012 – made landfall in the Philippines and China.
- 2013 – affected Andhra Pradesh and Tamil Nadu.
- 2016 – made landfall in Taiwan as a Category 4 typhoon.
- 2020 – a strong tropical storm that affected Mainland China, Hong Kong, Macau and Vietnam around the same area as Nuri two months prior.
- 2024 – a strong tropical storm that affected East China, Japan, South Korea and the Philippines.

- Helena

- 1947 – a Category 1 typhoon that affected South China and Vietnam.
- 1963 – passed between Dominica and Guadeloupe and struck Antigua.

- Helene

- 1950 – stalled near Japan and struck China.
- 1958 – a powerful storm that grazed Cape Hatteras causing $11 million in damage.
- 1962 – a tropical depression passed near the coast of Madagascar.
- 1969 – a strong tropical cyclones.
- 1988 – a Category 4 hurricane that stayed in the open sea, never threatening land.
- 2000 – entered the Caribbean Sea, made landfall at Fort Walton Beach, Florida, exited at the North Carolina coast and regained tropical storm strength heading northeast.
- 2006 – a Category 3 hurricane that stayed in the open ocean, never threatening land.
- 2012 – a tropical storm that affected Trinidad and Tobago and Mexico.
- 2018 – a Category 2 hurricane that formed between Cape Verde and West Africa.
- 2024† – extremely large Category 4 hurricane that made landfall in the Big Bend region of Florida.

- Helga

- 1966 – a category 1 hurricane, made landfall on the Baja California Peninsula and weakened into a tropical depression.
- 1970 – dissipated before reaching the coast of Mexico.
- 1971 – a strong tropical cyclone passed southeast of Réunion and Mauritius, bringing heavy rainfall to the former island.
- 1974 – did not affect land.

- Helming

- 1991 – struck the Philippines and China
- 1995 – a weak tropical storm that affected in the Philippines and South China.
- 1999 – a strong tropical storm that affected Japan and South Korea.

- Heling

- 1966 – short-lived tropical depression that was only tracked by PAGASA.
- 1970 – minimal tropical storm which affected the Philippines and China.
- 1974 – moderately strong tropical storm that hit Taiwan and eastern China.
- 1978 – another tropical storm which hit Taiwan and China.
- 1982 – weak tropical depression only recognized by PAGASA.
- 1986 – relatively strong typhoon that brushed the coast of Japan.
- 1990 – a typhoon which made landfall in the Philippines and Vietnam, killing at least 32 people.
- 1994 – another tropical depression that was only monitored by PAGASA.
- 1998 – skirted the Taiwanese coast as a typhoon before striking South Korea as a tropical storm, claiming 50 lives.

- Hellen (2014) – one of the most powerful tropical cyclones in the Mozambique Channel on record.
- Helose (1975) - A weak tropical storm that remained over the Mozambique Channel.
- Henri

- 1979 – took unusual route around Yucatán Peninsula, caused no significant damage.
- 1985 – crossed Long Island as a weak storm, no damages or casualties.
- 2003 – caused heavy rainfall along Florida's Gulf coast, Delaware, and Pennsylvania, causing $19.6 million (USD) in damage.
- 2009 – moderate tropical storm that formed northeast of the Lesser Antilles, causing no known deaths or damage.
- 2015 – a short-lived tropical storm, did not affect land.
- 2021 – moved clockwise around Bermuda before taking aim on southern New England; briefly strengthened into a Category 1 hurricane, before weakening back to a tropical storm and making landfall in Westerly, Rhode Island.

- Henriette

- 1968 – a strong tropical cyclone passed just east of Rodrigues.
- 1983 – a category 4 hurricane that remained offshore Mexico.
- 1989 – a weak tropical storm that remained at sea.
- 1995 – briefly moved over the Baja California Peninsula, causing strong winds.
- 2001 – strong tropical storm that did not affect land.
- 2007 – caused heavy rainfall before and after moving ashore western Mexico.
- 2013 – a category 2 hurricane, which moved into the Central Pacific.
- 2019 – a weak and short-lived tropical storm that remained at sea.
- 2025 – a long-lived system that became a Category 1 hurricane in the Central Pacific basin.

- Henry

- 1979 – a strong tropical cyclone affected Vanuatu and New Zealand.
- 2006 – a minimal typhoon which caused deadly flooding in southern China in August 2006.
- 2020 – struck Japan and brought heavy rain.
- 2014 – a category tropical cyclone to impact Taiwan in 2014.
- 2018 – a weak but very deadly tropical cyclone that devastated Vietnam and Laos in July 2018.
- 2022 – a large and powerful tropical cyclone that impacted Japan and South Korea.
- 2026 – a severe tropical storm that made landfall on the Hainan and Vietnam.

- Herb (1996) – struck the Ryūkyū Islands, Taiwan and the People's Republic of China, causing major damage.
- Herbert

- 1980 – a strong tropical storm threatened Hong Kong, and made landfall in Hainan and later in mainland China.
- 1983 – a tropical storm which struck Vietnam, resulting to 40 fatalities.
- 1986 – a strong tropical storm that made landfall in Vietnam.

- Herbie (1988)† – the only known tropical system to impact Western Australia during the month of May on record.
- Herman (2023) – reached the status of a severe tropical cyclone category 5 on the Australian scale, but remained away from land.
- Hermine

- 1970 – a tropical cyclone that affected Reunion.
- 1980 – strong tropical storm that caused flooding throughout Mexico.
- 1998 – a weak tropical storm that struck Louisiana, causing minimal damage.
- 2004 - made landfall in Massachusetts as a minimal tropical storm, causing very limited damage.
- 2010 - formed from the remnants of Tropical Depression Eleven-E in the East Pacific; caused extensive flooding and tornadoes throughout Texas and Mexico.
- 2016 - minimal hurricane that became the first to strike Florida in nearly 11 years, causing extensive damage.
- 2022 – a weak short-lived tropical storm that brought significant rainfall to the Canary Islands.

- Herming

- 1963 – a Category 1 typhoon that made landfall Philippines and Vietnam.
- 1967 – a Category 1 typhoon that caused over 300 fatalities in Japan.
- 1971 – made landfall in the Philippines and southern China.
- 1975 – a Category 1 typhoon that passed over Luzon in the Philippines and the Chinese island of Hainan
- 1979 – Strong tropical storm which made landfall in China.
- 1983 – a Category 4 typhoon that made landfall in the South China as typhoon Category 1.
- 1987† – a Category 5 super typhoon that severely impacted the Philippines, Vietnam and Thailand, causing $100 million worth of damages and claiming a total of 92 lives.

- Hernan

- 1984 – minimal tropical storm with no effect on land.
- 1990 – high-end Category 4 hurricane, didn't affect land.
- 1996 – struck Mexico as a Category 1 hurricane, caused unknown amount of damage.
- 2002 – a category 5 hurricane that caused minor effects in Mexico and California
- 2008 – a category 3 hurricane, no land impact.
- 2014 – minimal hurricane with no effect on land.
- 2020 – a weak storm that brushed Mexico as a tropical depression, causing flooding and mudslides.
- 2026 – a weak tropical storm that remained at sea.

- Herold (2020) – a powerful tropical cyclone that affected Madagascar and the Mascarene Islands in March 2020.
- Hester

- 1949 – a Category 3 typhoon that minimal affected Japan.
- 1952 – a Category 5 typhoon that affected Marshall Islands and Guam.
- 1957 – a Category 4 typhoon with no effect on land.
- 1960 – remained over the open ocean.
- 1963 – remained over the open ocean.
- 1966 – remained over the open ocean.
- 1968 – a strong tropical storm that made landfall South Vietnam.
- 1971 – was regarded as one of the most destructive storms to strike Vietnam since 1944.
- 1974 – a weak tropical storm formed in the South China Sea that made landfall Vietnam.
- 1978 – remained over the open ocean.

- Heta (2003)† – a Category 5 tropical cyclone that caused moderate damage to the islands of Tonga, Niue, and American Samoa.
- Hettie

- 1982 – a Category 3 severe tropical cyclone that minimal impact Fiji.
- 1992 – did not areas land.
- 2009 – did not directly affect any inhabited land areas.

- Hidaya (2024) – a Category 1 tropical cyclone formed near Seychelles and made a rare landfall in Tanzania.
- Higos

- 2002 – considered the fifth strongest typhoon to affect Tokyo since World War II.
- 2008 – a tropical storm affect Philippines and China.
- 2015 – an early strong typhoon of the 2015 season.
- 2020 – a strong tropical storm that affected Mainland China, Hong Kong, Macau and Vietnam around the same area as Nuri two months prior.
- 2026 – a weak tropical storm that formed at sea passed near the coast of Japan.

- Hilary

- 1966 – a tropical depression made landfall Madagascar.
- 1967 – formed south of the Baja California Peninsula, it moved northwestward until it dissipated the next day.
- 1971 – remained over the open ocean.
- 1975 – never came near land, and as such caused no death or damage.
- 1981 – did not make landfall.
- 1987 – did not make landfall.
- 1993 – a Category 3 hurricane that caused significant flooding in the Midwestern United States in August 1993.
- 1999 – did not make landfall.
- 2005 – formed near Mexico and moved parallel to it.
- 2011 – a powerful tropical cyclone that caused significant flooding in southwestern Mexico in late September 2011.
- 2017 – did not make landfall.
- 2023 – Category 4 hurricane which made landfall as a tropical storm along the Baja California peninsula, dumping torrential rain there and in Southern California.

- Hilda

- 1955 – a strong category 3 hurricane that was the second in a succession of three hurricanes to strike near Tampico, Mexico.
- 1963 – a short-lived storm that originated in the Mozambique Channel and moved south-southeastward.
- 1964† – an intense tropical cyclone that ravaged areas of the United States Gulf Coast, particularly Louisiana.
- 1979 – did not make landfall.
- 1985 – did not make landfall.
- 1990 – a category 2 tropical cyclone minimal affected New Caledonia.
- 1991 – a strong tropical storm, remnants caused rain as far north as San Francisco.
- 1997 – no threat to land and caused no known damage or deaths.
- 1999 – brought heavy rain to Sabah.
- 2003 – remained over the open ocean.
- 2009 – remained over the open ocean.
- 2015 – a powerful Category 4 hurricane, its remnants, brought heavy rainfall to the Big Island.
- 2017 – a category 2 tropical cyclone. Wind and flooding damage was reported along the coast in Broome.
- 2021 – did not make landfall.

- Hilwa (2012) – no threat to land and caused no known damage or deaths.
- Hina

- 1985 – one of the most intense tropical cyclones ever recorded in the South Pacific basin.
- 1997† – a category 1 tropical cyclone to affect the South Pacific island nation of Tonga since Cyclone Isaac in 1982.
- 2009 – not areas land

- Hinano (1989) – a Category 3 severe tropical cyclone but remained away from land.
- Hinnamnor (2022)† – a powerful tropical cyclone that recently impacted South Korea.
- Hobing

- 1964 – a Category 1 typhoon that stayed away from land.
- 1971 – a tropical depression.

- Hollanda (1994) – the worst tropical cyclone in Mauritius in 19 years.
- Holly

- 1969 – minimal hurricane that moved through the Lesser Antilles as a tropical depression
- 1976 – minimal hurricane that remained over open waters.
- 1981 – moderate tropical storm which formed and remained fairly close to the equator throughout its duration.
- 1984 – brought heavy rainfall and caused severe damage to the Korean Peninsula, causing one death.
- 1987 – attained super typhoon status, but remained away from land.

- Honde (2025) – a Category 1 tropical cyclone that affected South Madagascar.
- Hone (2024) – a Category 1 hurricane that impacted the U.S. state of Hawaii.
- Hope

- 1975 – a Category 1 tropical cyclone that minimal affected New Caledonia.
- 1976 – churned out at sea.
- 1978 – remained over the open ocean.
- 1979 – a category 4 super typhoon, brushed Taiwan then struck southern China; subsequently restrengthened to a severe tropical storm in the Bay of Bengal.
- 1982 – struck Vietnam.
- 1985 – threatened Luzon but turned north and eastward out to sea.

- Horacio (2026) – a Category 5 tropical cyclone that stayed out at sea; caused no damage.
- Hortense

- 1969 – tropical cyclone that passed through and affected Fiji and Vanuatu.
- 1973 – a powerful tropical storm passed south of Reunion, bringing rain to the island after hitting Madagascar.
- 1984 – meandered over Bermuda as a tropical storm, causing no reported damage.
- 1990 – disrupted by interaction with Hurricane Gustav.
- 1996† – damaging and deadly cyclone that passed over Guadeloupe and Puerto Rico, and grazed the eastern Dominican Republic and the Turks and Caicos Islands.

- How

- 1950 – a weak tropical storm that made landfall Tamaulipas as a tropical depression.
- 1951 – a Category 2 hurricane that affected East Coast of the United States.

- Howard

- 1980 – threatened the coasts of Southern California and the northern part of the Baja California Peninsula, but in the end never approached land.
- 1986 – never affected land.
- 1992 – never affected land.
- 1998 – never affected land.
- 2004 – a powerful Category 4 hurricane which produced large swells along the coasts of the Baja California Peninsula and southern California.
- 2016 – the remnants of the system moved through the main group of Hawaiian Islands where there were light rains that led to floods that occurred in the northwest of Oahu and in the northern parts of Maui.
- 2022 – never affected land.

- Huaning

- 1964 — a powerful typhoon struck the Philippines; also known as Cora beyond the PAR.
- 1968 — a category 1 typhoon made landfall Philippines and South China; also known as Shirley beyond the PAR.
- 1972 — tropical depression.
- 1976 — a powerful category 4 typhoon made landfall Philippines; also known as Ruby beyond the PAR.
- 1980 — threatened Hong Kong, and made landfall in Hainan and later in mainland China; also known as Herbert beyond the PAR.
- 1984 — a strong tropical storm made landfall east-northeast of Hong Kong as a tropical depression; also known as Gerald beyond the PAR.
- 1988 — struck the Philippines and China during July; also known as Warren beyond the PAR.
- 1992 — did not make landfall; also known as Lois beyond the PAR.
- 1996 — struck the Ryūkyū Islands, Taiwan and the People's Republic of China, causing major damage; also known as Herb beyond the PAR.
- 2000 — a weak tropical storm damage of the flooding brought by the extratropical remnants of Bolaven in Primorsky Krai exceeded 600 million rubles; also known as Bolaven beyond the PAR.
- 2001 — a Category 2 typhoon made landfall South China; also known as Yutu beyond the PAR.
- 2005 — a strong tropical storm made landfall Philippines and China; also known as Sanvu beyond the PAR.
- 2009 — tropical depression made landfall Taiwan.
- 2013 — a powerful tropical cyclone that caused widespread damage in Taiwan and East China in July; also known as Soulik beyond the PAR.
- 2017 — a weak tropical storm made landfall Taiwan and China; also known as Haitang beyond the PAR.
- 2021 — a tropical storm that affected Hong Kong and Macau, while also impacting the Guangdong and Fujian provinces in Mainland China; also known as Lupit beyond the PAR.
- 2025 – weak tropical storm that affected Japan; also known as Lingling beyond the PAR.

- Hubert

- 1985 – a Category 3 severe tropical cyclone that affected Western Australia.
- 1996 – remained over the open ocean.
- 2006 – a Category 2 tropical cyclone that made landfall Western Australia.
- 2010 – a destructive tropical cyclone that killed 85 people throughout Madagascar early March 2010.

- Hugo (1989)† – a powerful Cape Verde tropical cyclone that inflicted widespread damage across the northeastern Caribbean and the Southeastern United States in September 1989.
- Huko (2002) – passing near Johnston Atoll, the outer rainbands of the hurricane produced wind gusts up to and locally heavy rainfall.
- Huling

- 1965 – a Category 5-equivalent super typhoon that crossed Taiwan and killed 45 people along its path.
- 1969 – affected Taiwan and China.
- 1973 – affected the Philippines, China, and Vietnam.
- 1977 – struck Taiwan and China.
- 1981 – affected Taiwan and China.
- 1985 – struck North Korea.
- 1989 – made landfall on China.
- 1993 – crossed the Philippines and struck Hainan and Vietnam as a typhoon.
- 1997 – made landfall on South Korea as a tropical storm.

- Humberto

- 1995 – reached Category 2 Strength but remained in open sea.
- 2001 – passed near Bermuda but caused no damage.
- 2007 – made landfall in Texas as a strong Category 1 hurricane, causing one death and $50 million in damage.
- 2013 – affected the Cape Verde Islands; the first of only two hurricanes in the 2013 season.
- 2019 – Category 3 hurricane that impacted Bermuda.
- 2022 – a rare subtropical storm that formed off the coast of Chile and remained at sea.
- 2025 – a Category 5 hurricane that passed between Bermuda and the East Coast of the United States; had steering effect on Hurricane Imelda.

- Hunt

- 1989 – a Category 2 typhoon that made landfall Philippines.
- 1992 – a Category 4 typhoon, remained over open waters.

- Husing (1993) – a Category 4 typhoon that made landfall in the Philippines and South China.
- Hutelle (1993) – a weak tropical depression near Madagascar
- Hyacinth

- 1960 - made landfall on western Mexico as a depression.
- 1968 - struck Sinaloa, unknown damage.
- 1972 - a category 3 at peak; Made landfall in California as a weak depression, caused high surf.
- 1976 - a category 3, remained over open waters.

- Hyacinthe (1980) – wettest tropical cyclone ever recorded, dropped nearly twenty feet of rain in a caldera on Réunion and 3.3 feet in other areas.

== See also ==
- Tropical cyclone
- Tropical cyclone naming
- European windstorm names
- Atlantic hurricane season
- List of Pacific hurricane seasons
- South Atlantic tropical cyclone
