= List of storms named Hattie =

The name Hattie has been used for three tropical cyclones worldwide: one in the Atlantic Ocean and two in the West Pacific Ocean.

In the Atlantic:

- Hurricane Hattie (1961) – a Category 5 hurricane that made landfall south of Belize City.

The name Hattie was retired after the 1961 season and replaced by Holly in the 1969 season.

In the West Pacific:

- Typhoon Hattie (1990) – the fifth tropical cyclone of a record six to hit Japan during the 1990.
- Tropical Storm Hattie (1993) – remained over the open ocean.
