= List of storms named Helene =

The name Helene has been used for nine tropical cyclones worldwide: seven in the Atlantic Ocean, one in the South-West Indian Ocean, and one in the Western Pacific Ocean.

In the Atlantic:

- Hurricane Helene (1958) – a powerful storm that grazed Cape Hatteras causing $11 million in damage.
- Hurricane Helene (1988) – Category 4 hurricane that stayed in the open ocean
- Tropical Storm Helene (2000) – entered the Caribbean Sea, made landfall at Fort Walton Beach, Florida, exited at the North Carolina coast and regained tropical storm strength
- Hurricane Helene (2006) – Category 3 hurricane that stayed in the open ocean, never threatening land
- Tropical Storm Helene (2012) – tropical storm that affected Trinidad and Tobago and Mexico
- Hurricane Helene (2018) – Category 2 hurricane that formed between Cape Verde and West Africa
- Hurricane Helene (2024) – extremely large and destructive Category 4 hurricane that made landfall in the Big Bend region of Florida, and caused catastrophic flooding and damage across the Southeastern U.S.

The name Helene was retired after the 2024 season due to its catastrophic impacts across the Southeastern United States. The name was replaced with Holly for the 2030 season.

In the South-West Indian:

- Cyclone Helene (1969)

In the Western Pacific:

- Tropical Storm Helene (1950) (T5009) – stalled near Japan and struck China
