= Haima =

Haima may refer to:

- Haima Automobile, a Chinese automobile manufacturer based in Haikou, Hainan
- Haima, Oman, a town in central Oman
- Tropical Storm Haima, tropical cyclones in the Pacific Ocean
