= List of storms named Heidi =

The name Heidi has been used for two tropical cyclones in the Atlantic Ocean.

- Hurricane Heidi (1967)
- Tropical Storm Heidi (1971)

The name Heidi has also been used in the Australian Region.

- Cyclone Heidi (2012) – a small and moderately-powerful tropical cyclone that struck Western Australia in January 2012.
