= List of storms named Hazel =

The name Hazel has been used for seven tropical cyclones worldwide: two in the Atlantic Ocean, two in the Eastern Pacific Ocean, one in the Western Pacific, one in the South-West Indian Ocean, and one in the Australian region of the Indian Ocean.

In the Atlantic:

- Hurricane Hazel (1953) – Category 1 hurricane, made landfall just north of Fort Myers, Florida at peak intensity
- Hurricane Hazel (1954) – Category 4 hurricane, killed over 1000 people in Haiti, and also caused damage and death from South Carolina to Ontario

The name Hazel was retired by the U.S. Weather Bureau following the 1954 season.

In the Eastern Pacific:

- Tropical Depression Hazel (1963) – was downgraded after the fact; never attained tropical storm strength
- Tropical Storm Hazel (1965) – caused heavy damage in Mexico

The name Hazel was retired by the U.S. Weather Bureau following the 1965 season, and replaced with Heather.

In the Western Pacific:

- Typhoon Hazel (1948) (T4819) – a strong typhoon that caused damage in Taiwan and East China

In the South-West Indian:

- Cyclone Hazel (1965) – affected Madagascar

In the Australian region:

- Cyclone Hazel (1979) – a powerful tropical cyclone caused $41 million in damage, among the costliest cyclones in Western Australia
