= List of storms named Herbert =

The name Herbert has been used for three tropical cyclones in the Northwestern Pacific Ocean.

- Tropical Storm Herbert (1980) – a strong tropical storm threatened Hong Kong, and made landfall in Hainan and later in mainland China.
- Tropical Storm Herbert (1983) – a tropical storm which struck Vietnam, resulting to 40 fatalities.
- Tropical Storm Herbert (1986) – a strong tropical storm that made landfall in Vietnam.
