= List of storms named Hunt =

The name Hunt was used for two tropical cyclones in the Northwestern Pacific Ocean:

- Typhoon Hunt (1989) – a Category 2 typhoon that made landfall in the Philippines.
- Typhoon Hunt (1992) – a Category 4 typhoon, remained over open waters.
