= Tropical Storm Harriet =

Pacific tropical storm and North Indian cyclone in 1962

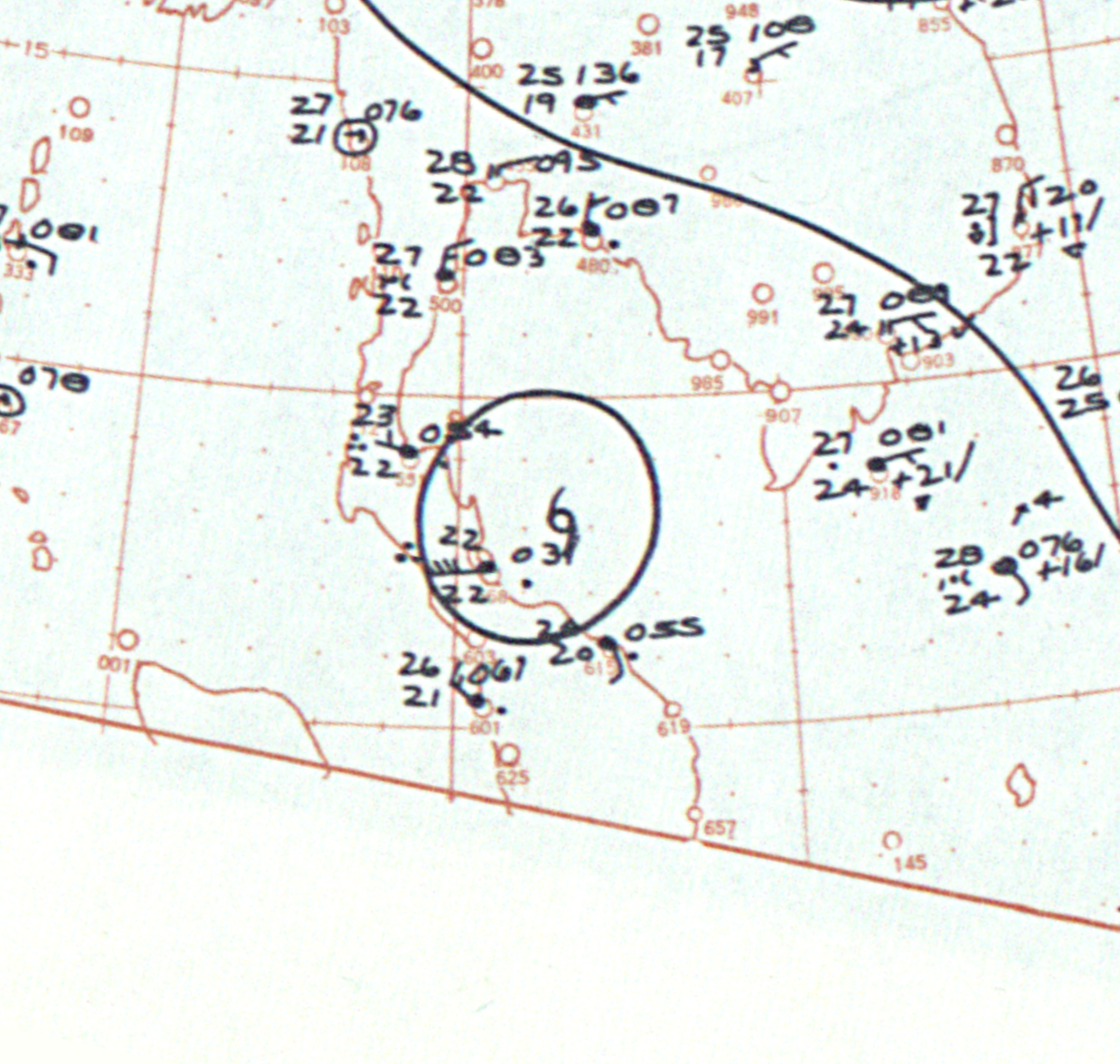
- Surface weather analysis of Harriet at its initial peak intensity approaching Thailand on October 25

Meteorological history
- Formed: October 19, 1962
- Dissipated: October 31, 1962

Severe cyclonic storm
- 3-minute sustained (IMD)
- Highest winds: 100 km/h (65 mph)
- Lowest pressure: 990 hPa (mbar); 29.23 inHg

Category 1-equivalent tropical cyclone
- 1-minute sustained (SSHWS/JTWC)
- Highest winds: 120 km/h (75 mph)

Overall effects
- Fatalities: ≥50,935 (Second deadliest Pacific typhoon, deadliest in Thai history)
- Damage: $34.5 million (1962 USD)
- Areas affected: Thailand, East Pakistan
- Part of the 1962 Pacific typhoon and North Indian cyclone seasons

Tropical Storm Harriet, also referred to as Severe Cyclonic Storm Harriet in India, was a rather weak but extremely deadly tropical cyclone that hit Thailand and East Pakistan in October 1962. It formed in the South China Sea before making landfall in Southern Thailand and crossing the Malay Peninsula into the Bay of Bengal. It caused extensive damage in Thailand, especially in the area of Laem Talumphuk, where it wiped out entire villages, caused over 900 fatalities and left over 10,000 people homeless, making it the deadliest storm in the history of Thailand.

== Meteorological history ==
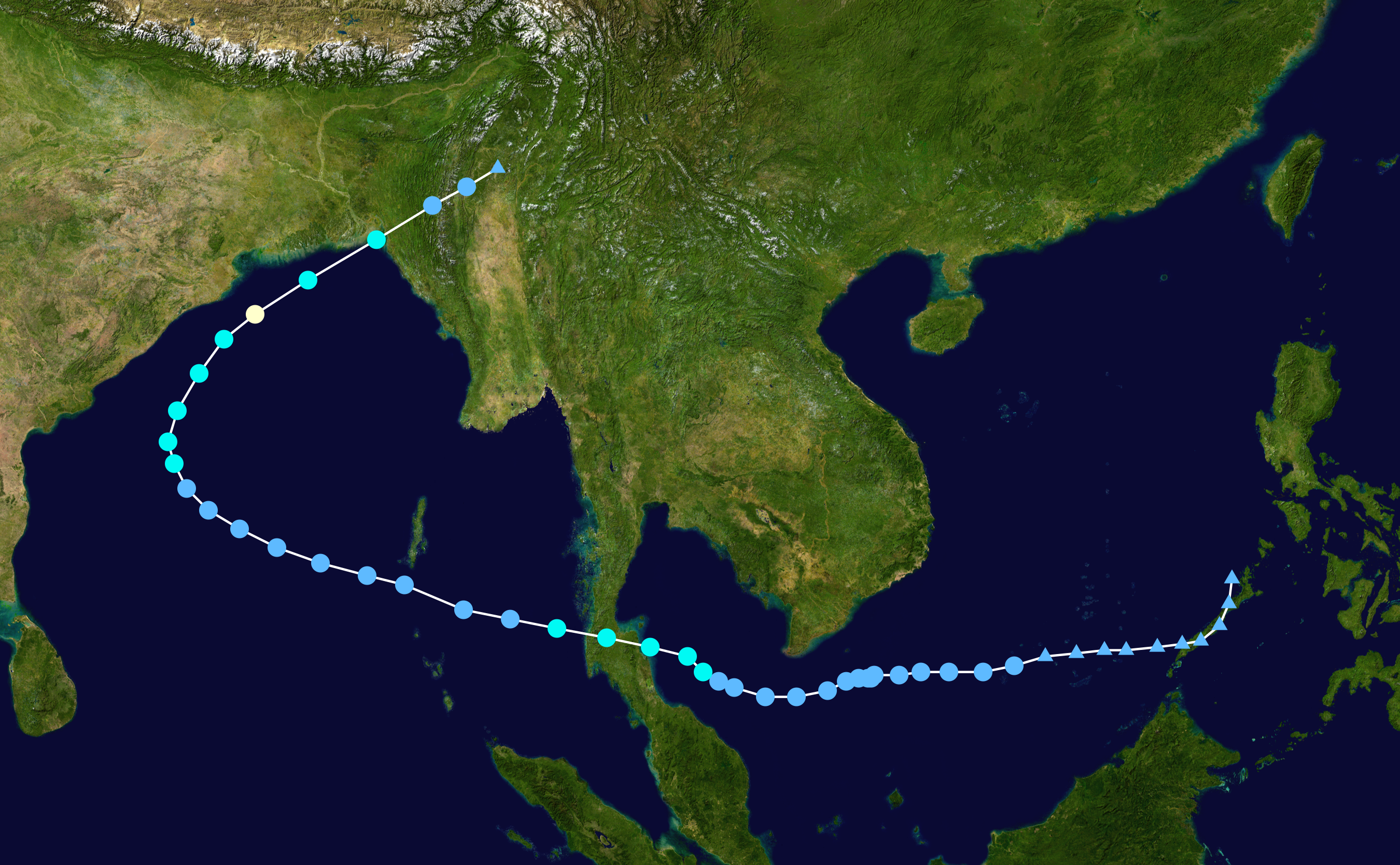
Map plotting the storm's track and intensity, according to the Saffir–Simpson scale Map key Saffir–Simpson scale Tropical depression (≤38 mph, ≤62 km/h) Tropical storm (39–73 mph, 63–118 km/h) Category 1 (74–95 mph, 119–153 km/h) Category 2 (96–110 mph, 154–177 km/h) Category 3 (111–129 mph, 178–208 km/h) Category 4 (130–156 mph, 209–251 km/h) Category 5 (≥157 mph, ≥252 km/h) Unknown Storm type Tropical cyclone Subtropical cyclone Extratropical cyclone, remnant low, tropical disturbance, or monsoon depression

The system that would become Tropical Storm Harriet formed off the western coast of the Philippines on the morning on the afternoon of October 19. The system proceeded northwest, then darted southwest off the coast, crossing through the South China Sea. The storm spent several days through the open ocean, unable to strengthen into a tropical depression. On October 23, the storm turned northward towards South Vietnam, but soon returned westward, slowly strengthening as it crossed the South China Sea. On the afternoon of October 25, the system finally strengthened into a tropical storm, receiving the name of Harriet. Winds peaked at 60 mph (95 km/h) for Harriet, which soon made landfall in Nakhon Si Thammarat Province in Thailand on October 25. After crossing the country, Harriet weakened into a low on October 26 in the open waters of the Indian Ocean. The system continued westward, then curved to the northeast. It attained peak 1 minute winds of 120 km/h (75 mph) on October 30 while approaching the northeastern Bay of Bengal. Soon after, the cyclone made landfall near Chittagong, East Pakistan (present-day Bangladesh) before dissipating over Burma (present-day Myanmar) on October 31.

== Impact ==
Deadliest tropical cyclones since 1900
Rank	Name/Year	Region	Fatalities
1	Bhola 1970	Bangladesh	≥300,000
2	Shanghai 1931	China	302,040
3	Bangladesh 1991	Bangladesh	138,866
4	Nargis 2008	Myanmar	138,373
5	Unnamed 1911	Bangladesh	120,000
6	Unnamed 1917	Bangladesh	70,000
7	Harriet 1962	Thailand, Bangladesh	50,935
8	Unnamed 1919	Bangladesh	40,000
9	Nina 1975	China	26,000
10	Unnamed 1958	Bangladesh	12,000
10	Unnamed 1965	Bangladesh	12,000

Harriet caused extensive damage in the area of Laem Talumphuk in Pak Phanang District of Nakhon Si Thammarat Province, where it wiped out entire villages. Initial reports noted at least 769 fatalities, with 142 missing as of November 4, and over 252 severe injuries. Damage at the time was estimated to be over $34.5 million (1962 USD) to government buildings, agriculture, homes and fishing fleets. The disaster left 16,170 people homeless and destroyed 22,296 buildings across the province. Final figures by the Thai Meteorological Department record 935 deaths, making it the deadliest tropical cyclone in the country's history.

The cyclone killed 50,000 people in what is now Bangladesh.

== See also ==
- List of storms named Harriet
- Typhoon Gay (1989) – Another tropical cyclone that crossed Thailand
- Cyclone Senyar (2025) – Deadliest tropical cyclone to impact Thailand in 21st century
