= List of storms named Harold =

The name Harold has been used for three tropical cyclones worldwide, while the similar name Herold has been used once in the South-West Indian Ocean.

In the Atlantic Ocean:

- Tropical Storm Harold (2023) – made landfall in southern Texas, brought needed rainfall to the Rio Grande watershed.

In the Australian region:

- Cyclone Harold (1997) – Category 2 tropical cyclone that didn't affect land
- Cyclone Harold (2020) – a Category 5 severe tropical cyclone that moved into the South Pacific basin and significantly impacted the Solomon Islands, Vanuatu, Fiji and Tonga.

In the South-West Indian Ocean:

- Cyclone Herold (2020) – affected Madagascar and the Mascarene Islands.
