= List of storms named Hubert =

The name Hubert has been used for twelve tropical cyclones worldwide: one in the Southwest Indian Ocean, and three in the Australian region.

In the Australian Region:

- Cyclone Hubert (1985) – a Category 3 severe tropical cyclone that affected Western Australia.
- Cyclone Hubert (1996) – remained over the open ocean.
- Cyclone Hubert (2006) – a Category 2 tropical cyclone that made landfall Western Australia.

In the South-West Indian Ocean:

- Tropical Storm Hubert (2010) – a destructive tropical cyclone that killed 85 people throughout Madagascar early March 2010.
