= List of storms named Helga =

The name Helga has been used for three tropical cyclones in the Eastern Pacific Ocean:

- Hurricane Helga (1966)
- Tropical Storm Helga (1970)
- Tropical Storm Helga (1974)

In the South-West Indian Ocean:

- Cyclone Helga (1971)
