= List of storms named Harriet =

The name Harriet has been used for eleven tropical cyclones worldwide: seven in the Western Pacific Ocean, one in the South-West Indian Ocean, and three in the Australian Region of the Indian Ocean.

In the Western Pacific:

- Typhoon Harriet (1952) – hit China as a Category 3-equivalent typhoon.
- Typhoon Harriet (1956) – struck Japan.
- Typhoon Harriet (1959) (58W) – hit the Eastern Philippines as a Category 4-equivalent typhoon, caused considerable property and crop damage on Luzon.
- Tropical Storm Harriet (1962) – hit Thailand, crossed into the North Indian Ocean where it hit East Pakistan, causing over 50,000 deaths.
- Typhoon Harriet (1965) (16W, Openg) – hit Taiwan as a Category 3-equivalent typhoon.
- Typhoon Harriet (1967) (34W) – a Category 3-equivalent typhoon that churned in the open ocean.
- Typhoon Harriet (1971) (T7112, 12W, Neneng) – traversed the Philippines and made landfall near the demilitarized zone between North and South Vietnam as a Category 4-equivalent typhoon.
- Tropical Storm Harriet (1977) (16W, Saling) – stayed at sea.

In the South-West Indian:

- Tropical Storm Harriet (1964) made landfall on Madagascar.

In the Australian Region:

- Cyclone Harriet (1982) – remained over the open ocean.
- Cyclone Harriet-Heather (1992) – passed just south of North Keeling Island, strengthened into a Category 5 on the Australian tropical cyclone intensity scale, then crossed into the South-West Indian Ocean.
- Cyclone Harriet (2003) – paralleled the coast of Western Australia but remained far offshore.
