= List of storms named Harry =

The name Harry has been used for four tropical cyclones worldwide: two in the Western Pacific, one in the Australian region, and one in the South Pacific Ocean. Additionally, it was also used for one European windstorm in the Mediterranean.

In the Western Pacific:

- Tropical Storm Harry (1991) – a weak tropical storm which made landfall in Japan.
- Tropical Storm Harry (1994) – another weak tropical storm that affected the Philippines, South China and North Vietnam.

In the Australian Region:

- Cyclone Harry (1976) – a Category 2 tropical cyclone passed north of the Cocos Islands.

In the South Pacific Ocean:

- Cyclone Harry (1989) – a Category 4 severe tropical cyclone that made landfall New Caledonia.

In the Mediterranean:

- Storm Harry (2026) – a catastrophic and deadly extratropical cyclone which caused landslides and large waves across the Mediterranean Sea.

== See also ==
- Cyclone Hary (2002) – a very intense, Category 5-equivalent tropical cyclone which impacted the northeastern part of Madagascar.
