= Typhoon Holly (1984) =

Pacific typhoon in 1984

Typhoon Holly (Isang)
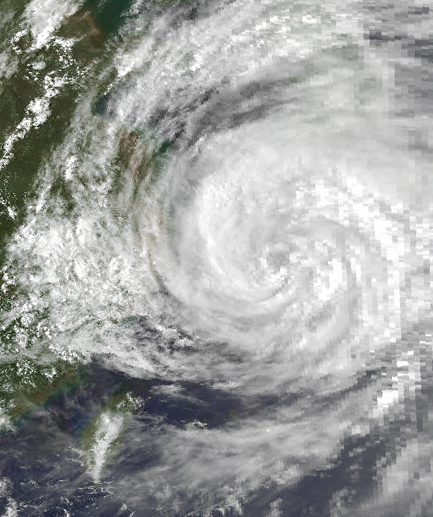
- Typhoon Holly on August 20

Meteorological history
- Formed: August 15, 1984
- Extratropical: August 22, 1984
- Dissipated: August 24, 1984

Typhoon
- 10-minute sustained (JMA)
- Highest winds: 140 km/h (85 mph)
- Lowest pressure: 960 hPa (mbar); 28.35 inHg

Category 1-equivalent typhoon
- 1-minute sustained (SSHWS/JTWC)
- Highest winds: 130 km/h (80 mph)

Overall effects
- Fatalities: 19
- Damage: $1 million (1984 USD)
- Areas affected: South Korea; Japan; Soviet Union
- IBTrACS
- Part of the 1984 Pacific typhoon season

Typhoon Holly, known in the Philippines as Typhoon Isang, affected South Korea, Japan, and the Soviet Union during August 1984. Holly originated from the monsoon trough that extended eastward from its original position in mid-August 1984. Over a period of several days, the system slowly became better organized as it tracked westward, although the system did not initially develop a well-defined center. On August 15, a tropical depression was declared, and on the next day, the depression was upgraded into Tropical Storm Holly. Holly slowly gained strength, becoming a typhoon on August 17 as it passed near Okinawa. The typhoon turned northwest and then north as it rounded a subtropical ridge. At noon on August 19, Holly attained its peak intensity of 130 km/h (80 mph). Shortly after its peak, Holly accelerated northeast due to the westerlies in the general direction of the Korean Peninsula. Land interaction with South Korea triggered a weakening trend, and after entering the Sea of Japan, Holly began to transition into an extratropical cyclone. Thunderstorm activity quickly decreased near the center, and by August 21, Holly had completed its extratropical transition.

In advance of the typhoon, ferry service between Jeju and mainland South Korea was called off, prompting 800 fishing boats to seek shelter. Throughout South Korea, nine people were killed or missing and hundreds lost their homes. At least 10 fishing boats were destroyed and hundreds of hectares of farmland were inundated. Across the Ryukyu Islands, 15,000 air travelers were stranded, including 14,000 from Okinawa when 23 flights were canceled. Between the Ryukyu Islands and the rest of Japan, ferry service was discontinued for two days, which resulted in 21,000 stranded passengers. Overall, one person was killed due to high waves in Nagasaki Prefecture, nine were listed as missing, and eleven were wounded. In all, damage was estimated at US$1 million. The extratropical remnants caused significant flooding in the Russian Far East. Water levels around Khabarovsk rose 10 m (33 ft) along the Amur River, resulting in the evacuation of 64 families, although 2,000 cows and pigs remain stranded. Elsewhere, in Arkhara, a dam along the Amur River burst, which caused the worst flooding in the region since 1928 and resulted in the evacuation of many isolated children by helicopter.

== Meteorological history ==
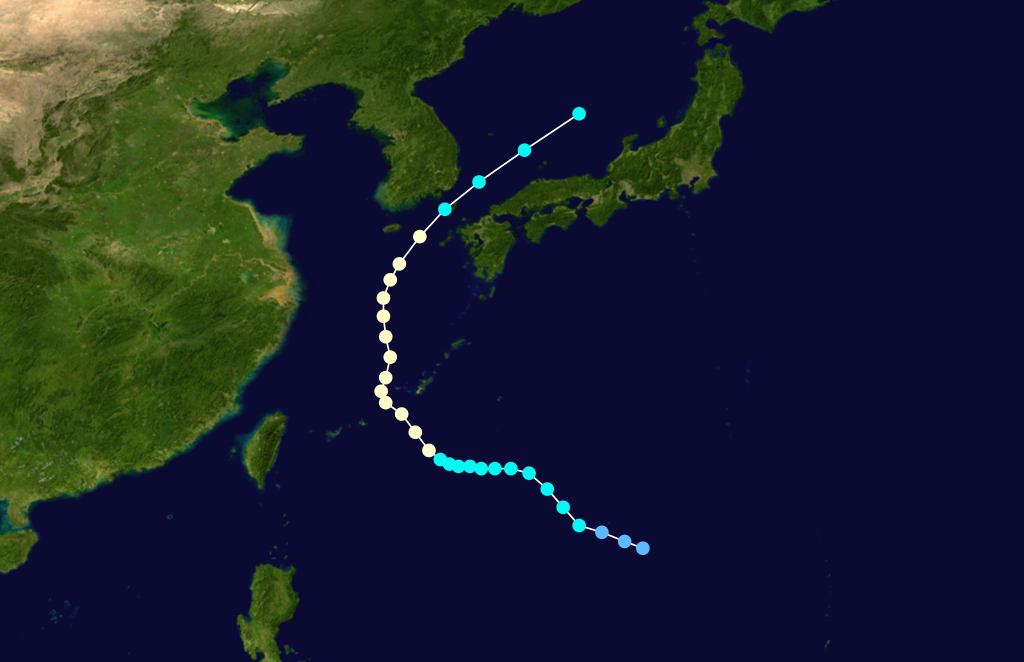
Map plotting the storm's track and intensity, according to the Saffir–Simpson scale Map key Saffir–Simpson scale Tropical depression (≤38 mph, ≤62 km/h) Tropical storm (39–73 mph, 63–118 km/h) Category 1 (74–95 mph, 119–153 km/h) Category 2 (96–110 mph, 154–177 km/h) Category 3 (111–129 mph, 178–208 km/h) Category 4 (130–156 mph, 209–251 km/h) Category 5 (≥157 mph, ≥252 km/h) Unknown Storm type Tropical cyclone Subtropical cyclone Extratropical cyclone, remnant low, tropical disturbance, or monsoon depression

While Tropical Storm Gerald was forming in the South China Sea, the Western Pacific monsoon trough extended eastward in the middle of August 1984. By noon on August 13, the monsoon trough extended from Tropical Depression 9W to just northwest of Guam, and within 36 hours, this trough moved northwest and became sharper, with surface barometric pressures of 1000 mbar (30 inHg) and winds of 40 to 50 km/h (25 to 30 mph). Organization of the convection gradually improved and satellite imagery indicated that a surface low was forming. The Joint Typhoon Warning Center (JTWC) issued a Tropical Cyclone Formation Alert (TCFA) at 15:15 UTC on August 14. At 00:00 UTC on the next day, a Hurricane Hunter aircraft investigated the system, measuring a pressure of 998 mbar (29.5 inHg). This prompted the Japan Meteorological Agency (JMA) to upgrade the low into a tropical depression. (Note: The Japan Meteorological Agency is the official Regional Specialized Meteorological Center for the western Pacific Ocean.)

At noon on August 15, synoptic data suggested that the system did not have a closed circulation; however, ship reports suggested that it was producing gale-force winds at the time. Early on August 16, a second aircraft investigated the system, finding a pressure of 992 mbar (29.3 inHg) and a closed circulation. This promoted the JTWC to classify the system as Tropical Storm Holly while the JMA upgraded Holly directly to severe tropical storm. (Note: Wind estimates from the JMA and most other basins throughout the world are sustained over 10 minutes, while estimates from the United States-based Joint Typhoon Warning Center are sustained over 1 minute. 10 minute winds are about 1.14 times the amount of 1 minute winds.) Despite its large size, Holly slowly deepened, and was upgraded to a typhoon by the JMA at noon on August 17. Nevertheless, Holly remained fairly disorganized, with aircraft observing light winds near the center and the strongest winds located in a rainband 110 to 280 km (70 to 175 mi) northeast from the center. It was not until August 18 that aircraft observed surface wind gusts of over 95 km/h (60 mph). At 00:00 UTC that day, the JTWC upgraded Holly into a typhoon while the storm was located near Okinawa.

After initially tracking westward under the influence of a subtropical ridge, Holly turned northwest for about a 30 hour period before turning north as it rounded the western side of the ridge. At noon on August 19, the JTWC reported that Holly attained its peak intensity of 135 km/h (85 mph) while the JMA reported that Holly reached its highest winds of 130 km/h (80 mph) and a minimum pressure of 960 mbar (28 inHg). Shortly after its peak, Holly turned northeast while also accelerating in response to the westerlies, which sent the storm across the Korean Straits on a collision course with the Korean Peninsula. Land interaction with South Korea resulted in a weakening trend, with both the JTWC and JMA downgrading Holly to a tropical storm. Upon entering the Sea of Japan, Holly began to transition into an extratropical cyclone. The low-level circulation quickly became exposed from the center, and what little convection remained was far removed from the center, and attached to a cold front. At 06:00 UTC on August 21, Holly was declared extratropical by the JMA, with the JTWC following suit 12 hours later. Two days later, the JMA had ceased tracking the cyclone altogether.

== Impact ==
Typhoon warnings were posted for Cheju Island and up to 80 km (50 mi) inland across South Korea. Ferry service between Cheju and the mainland was canceled due to the impeding threat of rough seas, prompting 800 fishing boats to seek shelter. Throughout South Korea, nine people were killed or missing and hundreds lost their homes. At least 10 fishing boats were demolished, hundreds of hectares of farmland were flooded, and several homes were damaged.

In some places of the southern portion of the island of Kyushu, forecasters anticipated that up to 280 mm (11 in) of rain could fall. Across the Ryukyu Islands, 15,000 air travelers were stranded. In Naha, the main city in Okinawa, an estimated 14,000 tourists were stranded when all 23 scheduled flights to Japanese main islands were canceled. Between the Ryukyu Islands and the Japanese mainland, ferry service was called off for two days, resulting in 21,000 stranded passengers. Further north, in Itsuki, 31 people lost their homes. Forty-one flights were cancelled in Miyazaki Prefecture, which caused an additional 4,200 stranded travelers. Overall, the storm dropped heavy rainfall across much of Japan. A peak rainfall total of 708 mm (27.9 in) occurred at Ebino, including 338 mm (13.3 in) in a day. Within 24 hours, 433 mm (17.0 in) of rain fell in Mount Yonaha, including 48 mm (1.9 in) an hour. Moreover, a wind gust of 108 km/h (67 mph) was recorded in Mount Yonaha while further south, wind gusts of 95 mph (153 km/h) were recorded in Okinawa. Nation-wide, one person was killed due to high waves in Nagasaki, nine were listed as missing, and eleven were wounded, including nine in Okinawa and the western prefectures of Kumamoto, Nagaski, Yamaguchi, and Hiroshima while two in Aichi Province sustained injuries after strong winds toppled a tree. Property damage was estimated at US$1 million.

The extratropical remnants caused significant flooding in the Russian Far East. Water levels around Khabarovsk along the Amur River rose 10 m (33 ft) to 51 m (167 ft), marking one of the few times the river reached that high since records began in the area in 1895. Due to the subsequent flooding, 64 families were evacuated, although 2,000 cows and pigs were left stranded. Further west, in Arkhara, a dam along the Amur River burst its banks along a 20.1 km (12.5 mi) stretch, resulting in the river's worst flooding since 1928 and the evacuation of many stranded children in helicopters.

== See also ==
- List of storms named Holly
- Typhoon Pat (1985)
