= List of storms named Hal =

The name Hal has been used for three tropical cyclones worldwide: one in the Australian region and two in the West Pacific Ocean.

In the Australian region:

- Cyclone Hal (1978) – traversed the Cape York Peninsula in Australia and later the North Island in New Zealand

In the West Pacific:

- Typhoon Hal (1985) (T8505, 05W, Kuring) – made landfall northeast of Hong Kong after striking the Philippines, causing 53 deaths with 3 missing
- Typhoon Hal (1988) (T8818, 14W) – remained over the open ocean

== See also ==
Storms with similar names

- Tropical Depression Hale (2023) – a South Pacific tropical cyclone
- Cyclone Haleh (2019) – a South-West Indian Ocean intense tropical cyclone
- Cyclone Haley (2013) – a South Pacific tropical cyclone
- Tropical Storm Hali (1992) – a Central Pacific tropical storm
