= List of storms named Hobing =

The name Hobing has been used to name two tropical cyclones in the Philippine Area of Responsibility in the West Pacific Ocean:

- Typhoon Hope (1964), a Category 1 typhoon that stayed away from land
- Tropical Depression Hobing (1971), a tropical depression
