= Tropical Storm Helene (2012) =

Tropical storm in 2012

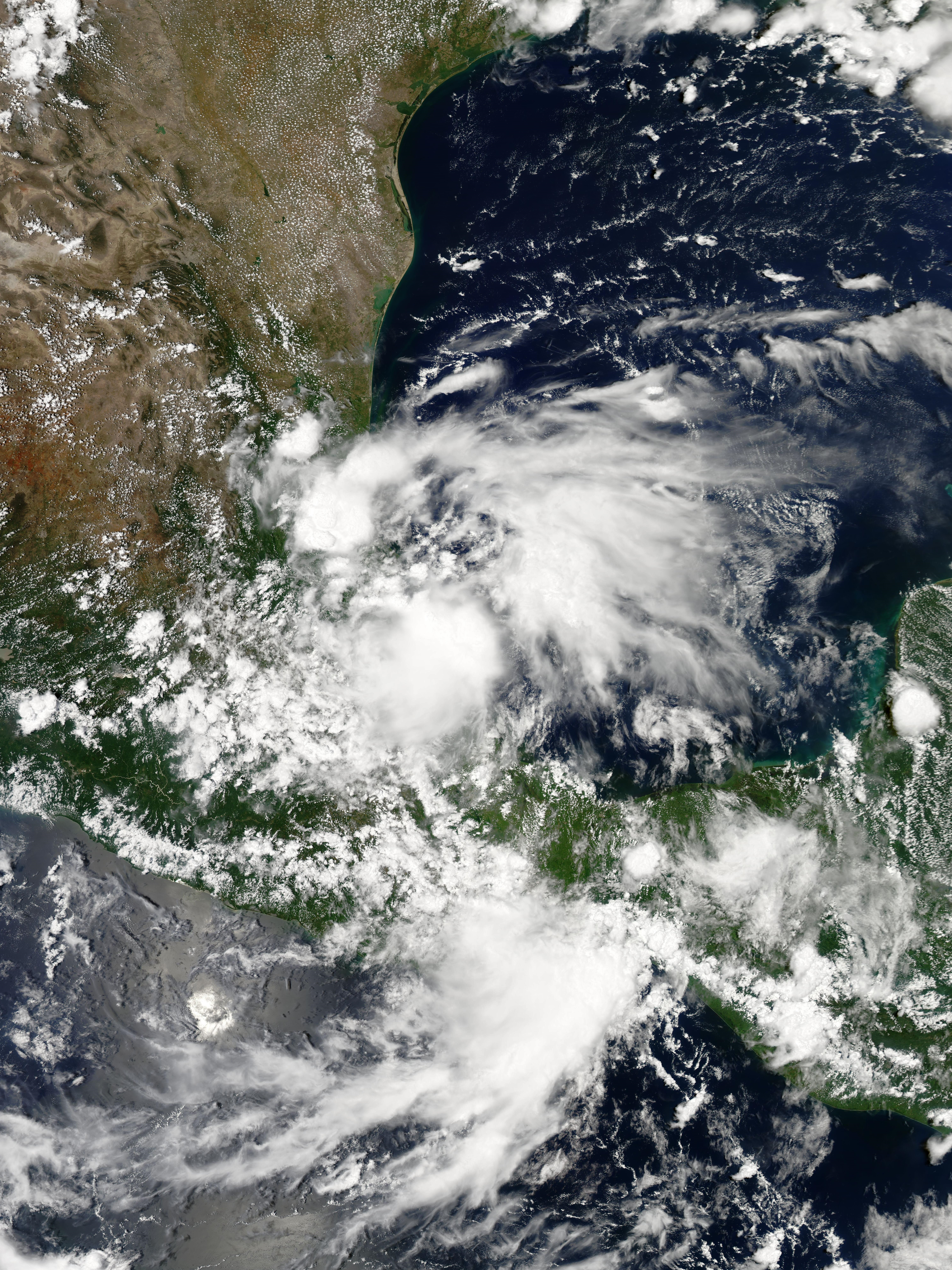
- Tropical Storm Helene over the Bay of Campeche on August 17, 2012

Meteorological history
- Formed: August 9, 2012
- Dissipated: August 18, 2012

Tropical storm
- 1-minute sustained (SSHWS/NWS)
- Highest winds: 45 mph (75 km/h)
- Lowest pressure: 1004 mbar (hPa); 29.65 inHg

Overall effects
- Fatalities: 2 total
- Damage: $17 million (2012 USD)
- Areas affected: Windward Islands, Trinidad and Tobago, Central America, Mexico
- Part of the 2012 Atlantic hurricane season

Tropical Storm Helene was a weak tropical storm which affected the southern Caribbean and Central America in mid-August 2012. The seventh tropical depression and eighth named storm of the 2012 Atlantic hurricane season, (Note: Hurricane Gordon formed later but was named before Helene; hence, Helene was the eighth named storm of the season.) Helene was monitored as a tropical wave that exited the west coast of the African continent on August 5. It gradually moved westward and became a tropical depression east of the Lesser Antilles four days later. However, unfavorable conditions initially prevented it from developing, which led to its initial degeneration to a remnant low as it traversed the Caribbean Sea.

== Meteorological history ==
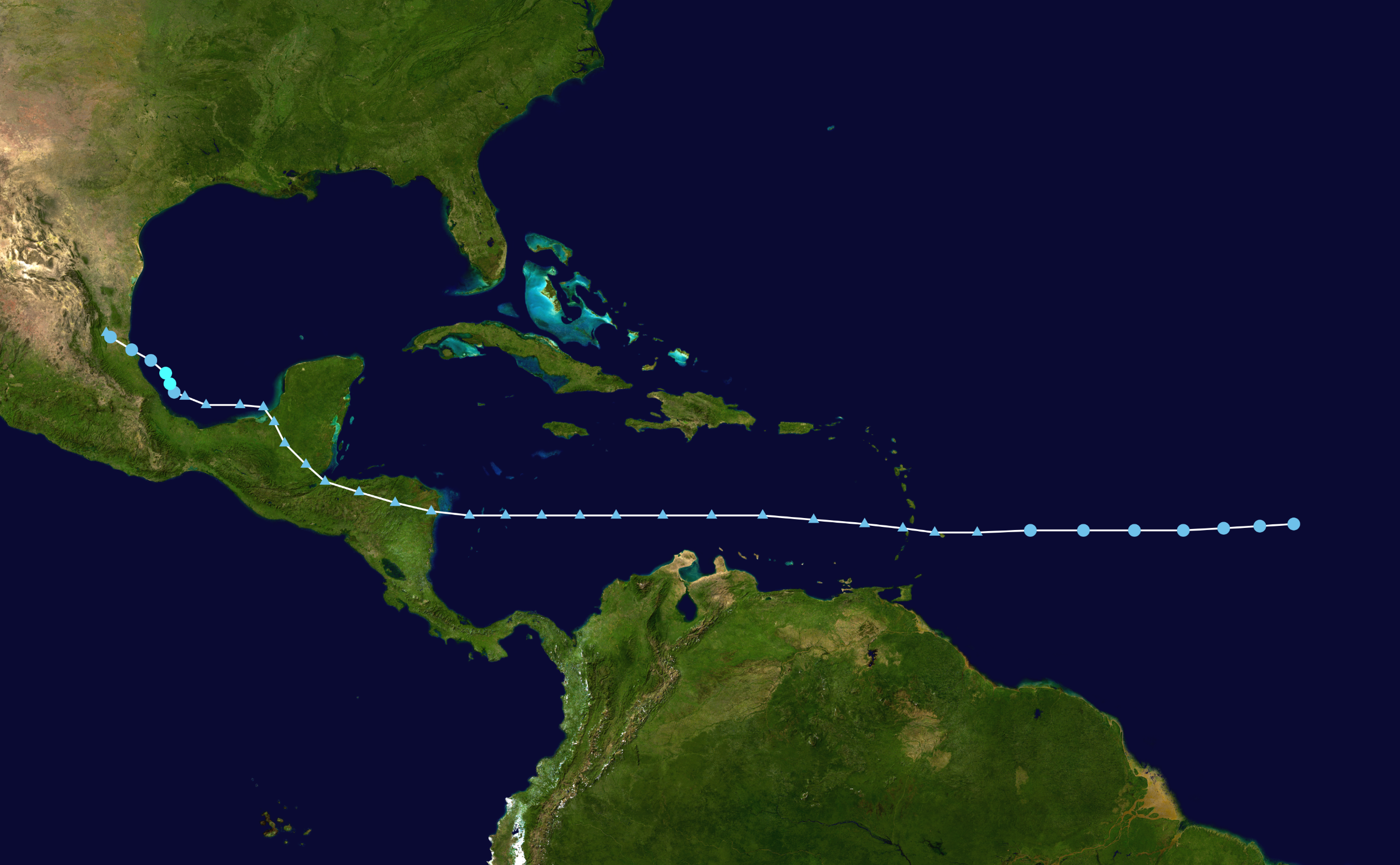
Map plotting the storm's track and intensity, according to the Saffir–Simpson scale Map key Saffir–Simpson scale Tropical depression (≤38 mph, ≤62 km/h) Tropical storm (39–73 mph, 63–118 km/h) Category 1 (74–95 mph, 119–153 km/h) Category 2 (96–110 mph, 154–177 km/h) Category 3 (111–129 mph, 178–208 km/h) Category 4 (130–156 mph, 209–251 km/h) Category 5 (≥157 mph, ≥252 km/h) Unknown Storm type Tropical cyclone Subtropical cyclone Extratropical cyclone, remnant low, tropical disturbance, or monsoon depression

Tropical Storm Helene originated from a tropical wave, with an accompanying area of low pressure, which moved off the west coast of Africa on August 5. The wave traversed westward with some cyclonic rotation occurring in the middle levels of the atmosphere and a large area of convection. Early on August 7, the National Hurricane Center (NHC) began to monitor the disturbance, noting the possibility of tropical cyclogenesis in the coming days. Although, the system was not expected to developed due to unfavorable upper-level wind shear. However, about 24 hours later, wind shear began to become more favorable for tropical cyclone development as the disturbance became better organized. By 18:00 UTC on August 9, thunderstorms became confined to the center of circulation, showing signs of further organization. This promoted the NHC to upgrade the disturbance into Tropical Depression Seven, while it was located roughly midway between Cape Verde and the Lesser Antilles. During the next day, the depression changed little despite being within a favorable environment, moving westward due to a subtropical ridge to its north. Despite an increase of convective activity on August 11, the system remained disorganized due to strong southwesterly wind shear, with its swift westward motion making it uncertain if a closed circulation still remained. By 12:00 UTC that day, Hurricane Hunters Reconnaissance aircraft failed to discover a well-defined or persistent circulation, signifying the depression's reabsorption into its parent wave.

The NHC continued to monitor the remnants of Seven as they crossed the Lesser Antilles, shortly after dissipation. The remnants entered the eastern Caribbean Sea on August 12 and produced a disorganized area of convection that stretched from the ABC Islands to the Leeward Islands. However, environmental conditions in the region remained unfavorable for regeneration. The next day, however, convection associated with the wave began to diminish, though started wind shear to become more favorable, land interaction with Central America halted further development. By August 14, shower and thunderstorm activity returned to normal, however, further organization was halted as the wave crossed through northeastern Nicaragua and eastern Honduras the following day. While over Central America, the disturbance spawned an area of low pressure which moved into the Bay of Campeche, late on August 16. Around this time, convective activity associated with the wave began to organize within an area favorable for tropical cyclogenesis. By 12:00 UTC the next day, surface observations and radar data depicted a better-defined circulation, with the NHC estimating the regeneration of Tropical Depression Seven occurred around this time.

Just six hours later, Hurricane Hunters Reconnaissance aircraft found peak-level winds of around 45 mph (75 km/h) (Note: All values for sustained wind estimates are sustained over 1 minute, unless otherwise specified.) and a minimum pressure of around 1004 mbar (29.65 inHg), with the NHC upgrading the system into Tropical Storm Helene as the storm reached its peak intensity. However, the storm still remained disorganized with convection being displaced west of the center, while winds were being enhanced by the displaced convection and topography. Almost immediately, Helene began to weaken while drifting gradually west-northwestward towards the eastern coastline of Mexico. Early on August 18, satellite observations depicted a deteriorating cloud pattern, despite a well-defined circulation and environmental conditions conducive for development. Around 12:00 UTC that day, Helene was downgraded into a tropical depression and crossed the Mexican coastline near Tampico, Tamaulipas. Despite the center moving inland, a new burst of deep convection formed near the center likely due to upslope flow from the Sierra Madre Occidental, with convective banding features offshore remaining potent. At 0:00 UTC on August 19, Helene degenerated into a broad area of low pressure, with convective activity now degraded to only a few showers. Just six hours later, the remnants of Helene dissipated.

== Preparations and impact ==
=== Caribbean ===
The remnants of Tropical Depression Seven caused severe flooding in Trinidad on August 11. Flooding damaged retaining walls at 50 homes in Diego Martin, which was cut off by floodwaters. A total of 12 homes were destroyed the floods. Heavy rainfall and mudslides were reported across the island, which resulted in the deaths of two people. Major damage was reported to infrastructure, including loss of utility assets and damage to roadways. Following the floods, 1,112 members of the Diego Martin Regional Corporation were deployed to assist in relief efforts. The regional corporation reported that 225 people had asked for assistance. Damage from the floods totaled to around $17 million (2012 USD). A total of 12 people had to find refuge in shelters. The remnants of Seven caused a 1 in 50 year event in Diego Martin, according to local corporations.

In Dominica, over 4 inches (101.6 mm) of precipitation fell in the Layou-Roseau area within a three-hour period, causing minor flooding. Some areas lost connection to internet, including the Office of Disaster Management (ODM) building. Flooding in Castle Bruce resulted in the drowning deaths of 14 livestock. Minimal pockets of flooding were reported in Saint Lucia, but floodwaters rapidly receded. The remnants of Seven brought tropical storm-force wind gusts and torrential rainfall to Central America while crossing between August 14–15. The system also brought increased moisture and shower activity to Belize, with rain peaking at around 0.75 inches (19.05 mm) in northern parts of the country.

=== Mexico ===
Upon reformation, the Government of Mexico issued a Tropical Storm Warning from Barra de Naulta, Veracruz to La Cruz, Tamaulipas. This was discontinued as Helene moved inland and weakened, at 15:00 UTC on August 18. As Helene approached land, the Sistema Nacional de Protección Civil (SINAPROC) declared a red alert for southern Tamaulipas and northern Veracruz. Personnel from civil protection programs were stationed in the municipalities of Pueblo Viejo, Tampico Alto, and Pánuco to monitor weather conditions and provide aid to residents. Ports in northern and central Veracruz prohibited non-essential transportation.

== See also ==
- Other tropical cyclones of the same name
- Weather of 2012
- Tropical cyclones in 2012
- Tropical Storm Dolly (2014) — affected similar areas.
- Tropical Storm Danielle (2016) — took a nearly identical track and made landfall in nearly the same area.
- Hurricane Earl (2016) — affected similar areas.
- Tropical Storm Chris (2024) — similar track and affected nearly the same areas.
