= List of storms named Helming =

The name Helming has been used to name three tropical cyclones in the Philippine Area of Responsibility in the West Pacific Ocean:

- Tropical Storm Brendan (1991) (T9108, 08W, Helming), struck the Philippines and China
- Tropical Storm Nina (1995) (T9511, 15W, Helming), a weak tropical storm that affected in the Philippines and South China
- Tropical Storm Neil (1999) (T9904, 9W, Helming), a strong tropical storm that affected Japan and South Korea
