= Tropical Storm Hazel (1965) =

Pacific tropical storm in 1965

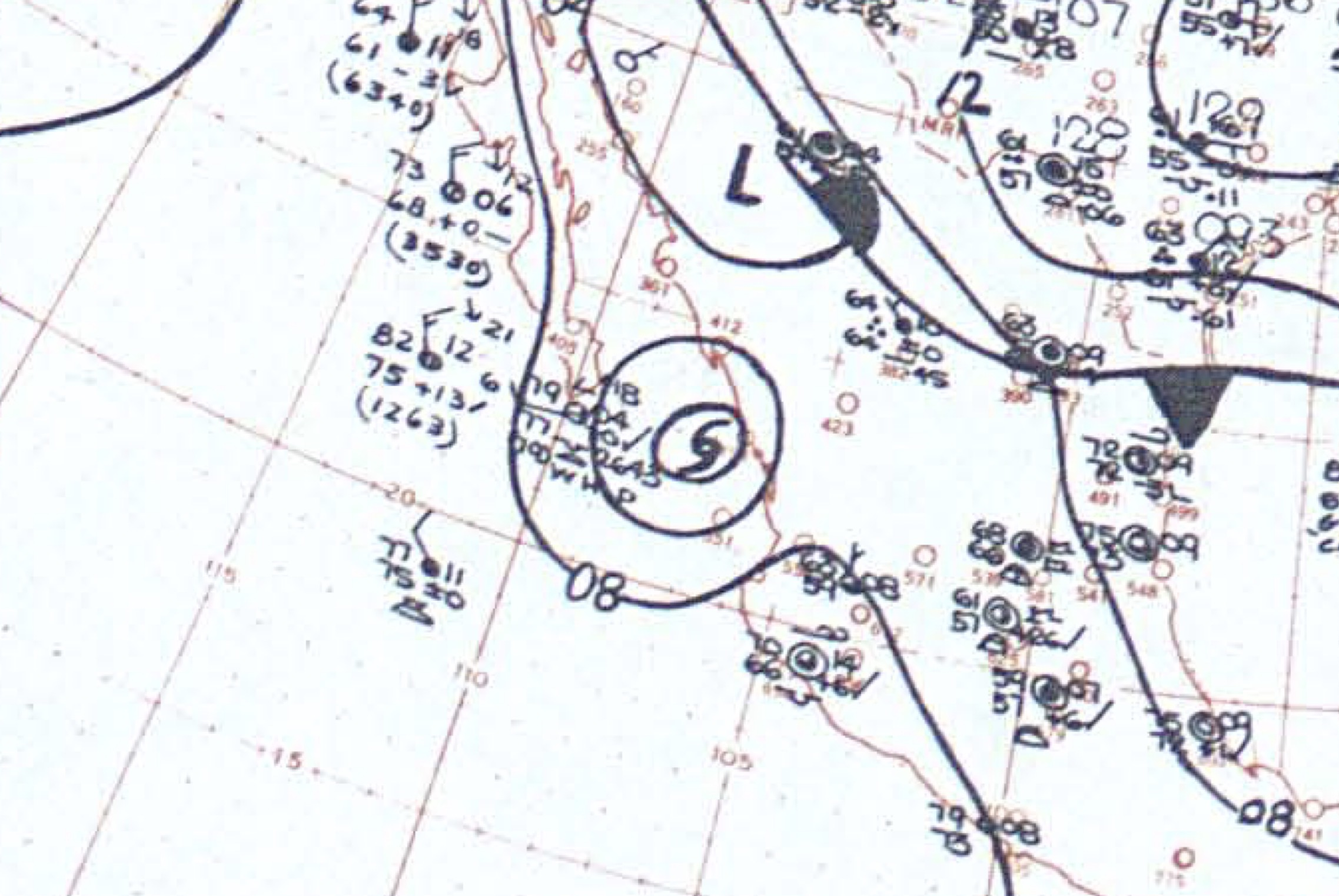
- Weather map of Tropical Storm Hazel nearing landfall in Mexico on September 26

Meteorological history
- Formed: September 24, 1965
- Dissipated: September 27, 1965

Tropical storm
- 1-minute sustained (SSHWS/NWS)
- Highest winds: 45 mph (75 km/h)
- Lowest pressure: ≤986 mbar (hPa); ≤29.12 inHg

Overall effects
- Fatalities: 6
- Damage: $10 million (1965 USD)
- Areas affected: Mexico
- IBTrACS
- Part of the 1965 Pacific hurricane season

Tropical Storm Hazel was a weak East Pacific tropical cyclone that caused heavy damage in Mexico. The costliest storm of the 1965 Pacific hurricane season, it formed from a northward-moving disturbance that originated southeast of Socorro Island. After reaching tropical storm strength on the Saffir–Simpson Hurricane Scale, the cyclone turned to the east-northeast. The storm made landfall near Mazatlán on September 26 and quickly transitioned an extratropical cyclone. Although fairly weak, the system was responsible for causing heavy damage to the Mexican economy. Flooding in Mazatlán washed out many houses and submerged others in muddy water. At least six people died with damages totaling $10 million (1965 USD) and possibly higher. The name Hazel was retired following this storm.

== Meteorological history ==
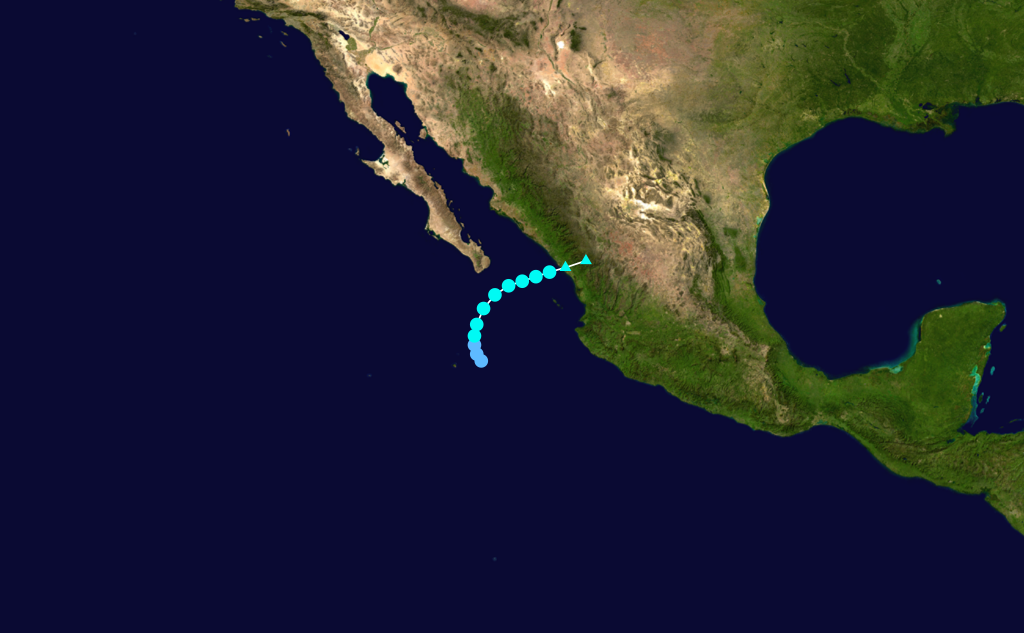
Map plotting the storm's track and intensity, according to the Saffir–Simpson scale Map key Saffir–Simpson scale Tropical depression (≤38 mph, ≤62 km/h) Tropical storm (39–73 mph, 63–118 km/h) Category 1 (74–95 mph, 119–153 km/h) Category 2 (96–110 mph, 154–177 km/h) Category 3 (111–129 mph, 178–208 km/h) Category 4 (130–156 mph, 209–251 km/h) Category 5 (≥157 mph, ≥252 km/h) Unknown Storm type Tropical cyclone Subtropical cyclone Extratropical cyclone, remnant low, tropical disturbance, or monsoon depression

On September 22, a weak tropical disturbance was first observed southeast of Socorro Island. The disturbance moved northward uneventfully until late on September 23, when the disturbance became a tropical depression at a distance of 100 mi (160 km). The next day, the depression intensified into a tropical storm while moving north at 8 mph (13 km/h). Later on September 24, satellite imagery suggested winds of up to 50 mph (80 km/h) near the center. Around that time, Tropical Storm Hazel reached its peak pressure of 986 mbar (29.1 inHg). On September 26, a ship reported peak winds of 60 mph (97 km/h). The storm then moved towards the east-northeast and made landfall just south of Mazatlán on September 26 and transitioned into an extratropical cyclone shortly thereafter.

== Preparations and impact ==
Since meteorologists were expecting Hazel to remain away from land, many residents were unprepared for the storm. However, 10,000 people fled the low-lying areas of Mazatlán. Substantial damage was recorded in the city Many rivers overflowed its banks, and roughly 5,000 people were without shelter. The entire city of Mazatlán was without power and the city water system was damaged. At least 50 boats were damaged or sunk by the storm. The damage from the storm was estimated to be at least $10 million (1965 USD), making Hazel the costliest tropical cyclone of the season. Three people were reported killed in Mazatlán, two fishermen died when attempted to ride out the storm, and a boy who was electrocuted by a downed power line. Three additional deaths from electrocutions were reported in a rural section of Nayarit. Due to a communications breakdown, no word was received about six vacationers in Mazatlán. The city was only reachable by boat. In addition, several shacks made of wood, tin, and cardboard were either washed away or inundated by up to 6 ft (1.8 m) of muddy water while flooding from the storm had washed out bridges and roads throughout the state and some merges were cancelled. The cyclone also had a major impact on the coastal economy since Mazatlán's shrimp fleet, which makes up the base of the city's economy. In southern Sinaloa, 55,000 acres (220 km^{2}) of cotton, corn, and sorghum were lost. There were also reports of heavy losses to livestock. On account of the storm, 1,000 people sought shelter in schools; in the farm areas of Barron and El Wailamo, people were taking refuge on top of trees and homes. Army units and relief agencies rushed to provide aid to coastal cities.

=== Retirement ===
As a result of the damage caused, the name Hazel was retired, and will never again be used for a Pacific hurricane. It was replaced with Heather in 1969.

== See also ==
- List of Pacific hurricanes
- Other tropical cyclones named Hazel
