= Tropical Storm Higos (2020) =

Pacific severe tropical storm in 2020

Severe Tropical Storm Higos (Helen)
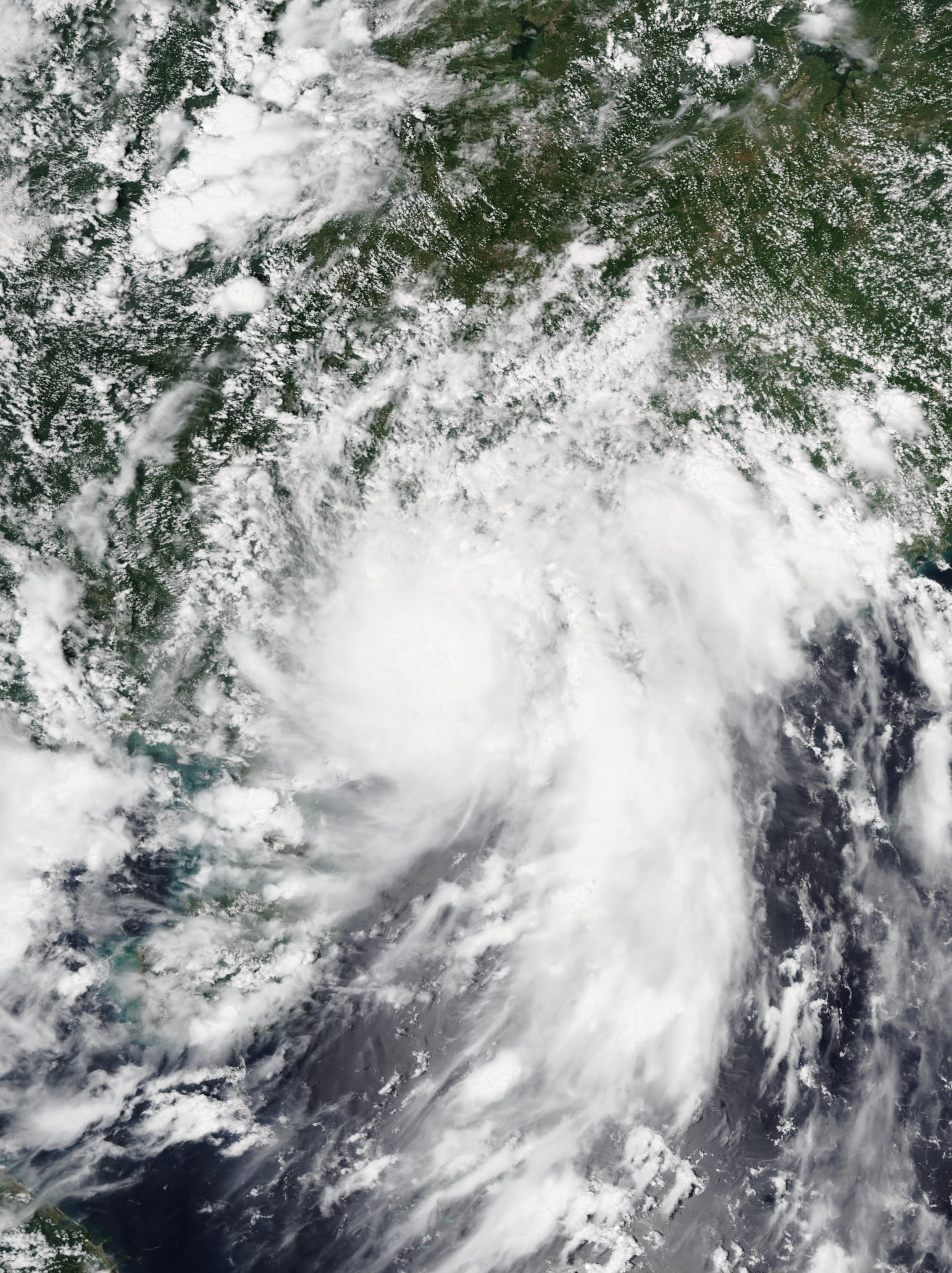
- Severe Tropical Storm Higos at peak intensity on August 19.

Meteorological history
- Formed: August 16, 2020
- Dissipated: August 20, 2020

Severe tropical storm
- 10-minute sustained (JMA)
- Highest winds: 100 km/h (65 mph)
- Lowest pressure: 992 hPa (mbar); 29.29 inHg

Tropical storm
- 1-minute sustained (SSHWS/JTWC)
- Highest winds: 110 km/h (70 mph)
- Lowest pressure: 988 hPa (mbar); 29.18 inHg

Overall effects
- Fatalities: 7
- Damage: ≥$142 million (2020 USD)
- Areas affected: Mainland China, Taiwan, Vietnam, Hong Kong
- IBTrACS
- Part of the 2020 Pacific typhoon season

Severe Tropical Storm Higos, (Note: The name Higos (Chamorro: higos, [higos]) was contributed by the United States and means fig in Chamorro.) known in the Philippines as Tropical Depression Helen, was a tropical storm that affected China and Vietnam around the same area as Nuri two months prior. Higos formed from a tropical disturbance north of Luzon, the Philippines, on August 16. The storm tracked northeast and quickly intensified, becoming a tropical storm on August 17. The storm made landfall in Zhuhai, Guangdong at peak intensity on August 19, and quickly weakened soon after. Higos killed 7 people and caused 45 billion đồng (US$2 million) in damages in Vietnam. Higos also caused more than US$140 million in damages, but no fatalities in China.

== Meteorological history ==
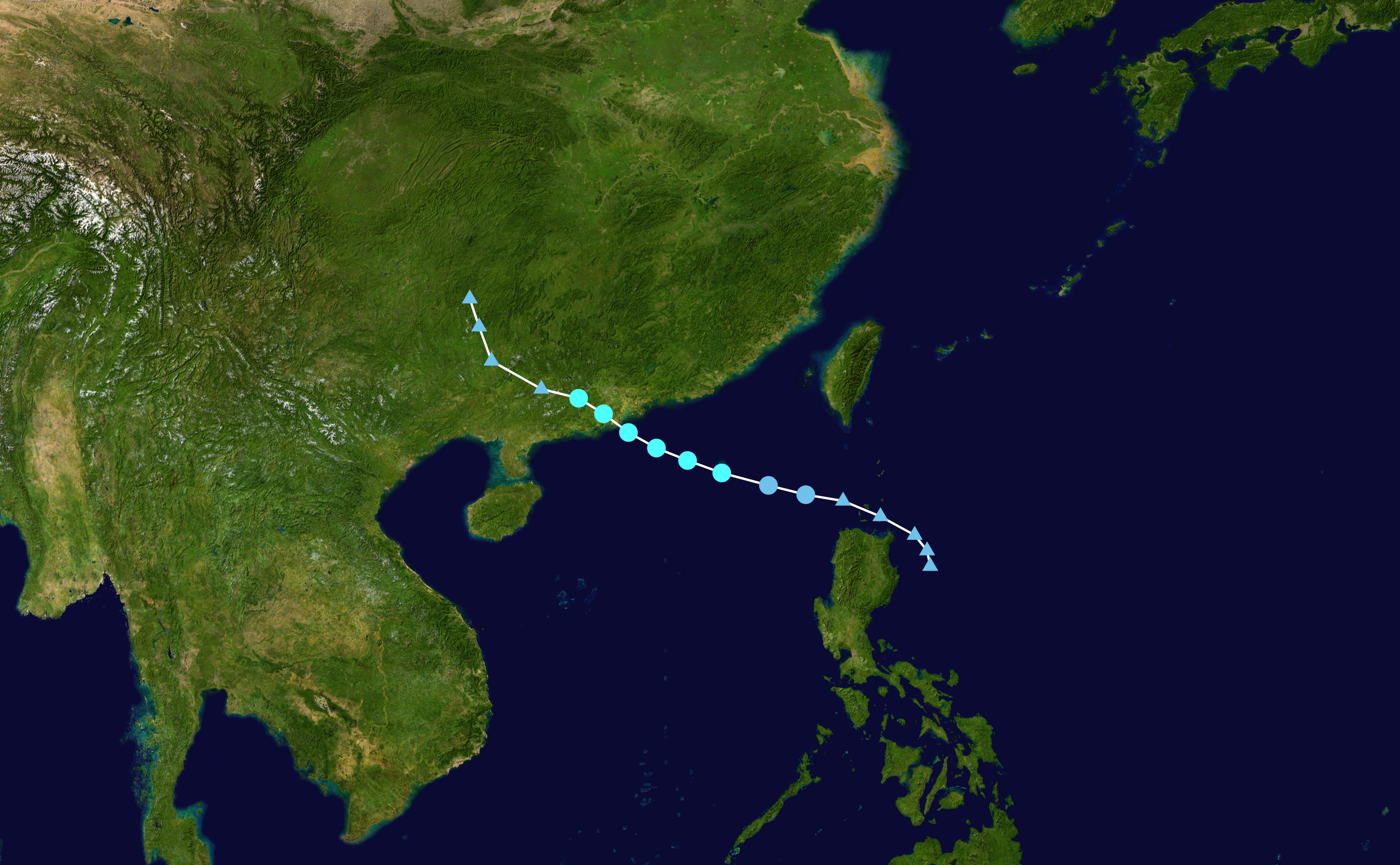
Map plotting the storm's track and intensity, according to the Saffir–Simpson scale Map key Saffir–Simpson scale Tropical depression (≤38 mph, ≤62 km/h) Tropical storm (39–73 mph, 63–118 km/h) Category 1 (74–95 mph, 119–153 km/h) Category 2 (96–110 mph, 154–177 km/h) Category 3 (111–129 mph, 178–208 km/h) Category 4 (130–156 mph, 209–251 km/h) Category 5 (≥157 mph, ≥252 km/h) Unknown Storm type Tropical cyclone Subtropical cyclone Extratropical cyclone, remnant low, tropical disturbance, or monsoon depression

A new tropical depression formed from the Intertropical Convergence Zone east of Luzon on August 16. At 15:00 UTC, the PAGASA named the system Helen and began issuing severe weather bulletins for the tropical depression, but dropped the alerts as Helen left the Philippine area of responsibility after 4 hours. Around 21:00 UTC, JTWC issued the first Tropical Cyclone Formation Alert on the developing tropical depression. Early on the next day, JTWC followed suit from JMA and PAGASA by upgrading the system into Tropical Depression 08W. Shortly after, Helen intensified into a tropical storm and were given the name Higos by the JMA. Later in the day, the Joint Typhoon Warning Center also upgraded Higos into a tropical storm. JMA eventually upgraded the system to a severe tropical storm by evening that day. The Hong Kong Observatory and Macau Meteorological and Geophysical Bureau upgraded Higos into a marginal typhoon prior to landfall, with sustained hurricane-force winds in Macau indicating such an intensity. Higos made landfall over Zhuhai, Guangdong at peak intensity at around 06:00 CST on August 19 (22:00 UTC on August 18). After landfall, Higos quickly weakened soon after and would dissipate in Guizhou, China on August 20.

== Preparations and impact ==
In preparation for Higos, the Hong Kong Observatory raised the number 9 tropical cyclone warning signal in Hong Kong to warn of the possibility of hurricane-force winds. Winds generally reached gale to storm force over the southern part of Hong Kong under the influence of Higos's small circulation. The Macao Meteorological and Geophysical Bureau issued the number 10 signal, the highest signal, at 05:00 am local time. Over 65,000 people evacuated and schools were closed across these areas. Power was knocked out in Meizhou, after trees knocked down power lines. Two campers who were unaware of the approaching storm had to be rescued from Tap Mun Island after arriving on August 14. The storm also left 7 deaths and 45 billion đồng (US$2 million) in damages in Vietnam.

== See also ==
- Weather of 2020
- Tropical cyclones in 2020
