= List of storms named How =

The name How has been used for two tropical cyclones in the Atlantic Ocean:

- Tropical Storm How (1950) – a weak tropical storm that made landfall Tamaulipas as a tropical depression.
- Hurricane How (1951) – a Category 2 hurricane that affected East Coast of the United States.
