= List of storms named Helena =

The name Helena has been used for two tropical cyclones worldwide: one in the Atlantic Ocean and one in the Western Pacific Ocean.

In the Atlantic Ocean:

- Tropical Storm Helena (1963) – passed between Dominica and Guadeloupe and struck Antigua

In the Western Pacific Ocean:

- Typhoon Helena (1947) – Category 1 typhoon that affected South China and Vietnam
