= List of storms named Herming =

The name Herming has been used to name seven tropical cyclones in the Philippine Area of Responsibility in the West Pacific Ocean:

- Typhoon Wendy (1963) (T6308, 10W, Herming), a Category 1 typhoon that made landfall Philippines and Vietnam
- Typhoon Billie (1967) (T6707, 07W, Herming), a Category 1 typhoon that caused over 300 fatalities in Japan
- Typhoon Dinah (1971) (T7108, 08W, Herming), made landfall in the Philippines and southern China
- Typhoon Alice (1975) (T7511, 13W, Herming), a Category 1 typhoon that passed over Luzon in the Philippines and the Chinese island of Hainan
- Tropical Storm Gordon (1979) (T7910, 07W, Herming), strong tropical storm which made landfall in China
- Typhoon Ellen (1983) (T8309, 10W, Herming), a Category 4 typhoon that made landfall in the South China as typhoon Category 1
- Typhoon Betty (1987) (T8709, 09W, Herming), a Category 5 super typhoon that severely impacted the Philippines, Vietnam and Thailand, causing $100 million worth of damages and claiming a total of 92 lives
