= Typhoon Hattie =

Pacific typhoon in 1990

Typhoon Hattie (Pasing)
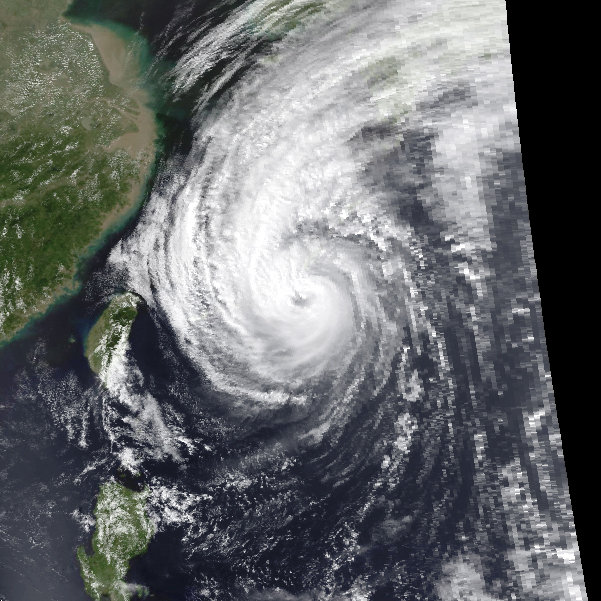
- Typhoon Hattie early on October 5

Meteorological history
- Formed: September 30, 1990
- Dissipated: October 8, 1990

Typhoon
- 10-minute sustained (JMA)
- Highest winds: 150 km/h (90 mph)
- Lowest pressure: 950 hPa (mbar); 28.05 inHg

Category 2-equivalent typhoon
- 1-minute sustained (SSHWS/JTWC)
- Highest winds: 165 km/h (105 mph)
- Lowest pressure: 954 hPa (mbar); 28.17 inHg

Overall effects
- Fatalities: 3 confirmed
- Missing: 1
- Damage: $9.9 million (1990 USD)
- Areas affected: Japan
- IBTrACS
- Part of the 1990 Pacific typhoon season

Typhoon Hattie, known in the Philippines as Typhoon Pasing, was the fifth tropical cyclone of a record-six to hit Japan during the 1990 Pacific typhoon season. Hattie originated from an area of disturbed weather that developed within the Western Pacific monsoon trough towards the end of September. Tracking westward, the disturbance initially was slow to develop, although on September 30, the system was classified as a tropical depression. Following an improvement of its convective structure and an increase in associated convection, the depression was upgraded into Tropical Storm Hattie on October 1. Following the development of an eye, Hattie attained typhoon intensity on October 2. The typhoon continued to slowly deepen as its forward speed slowed. Despite a decrease in cloud top temperatures around the eye, Hattie was estimated to have attained peak intensity on October 5. After recurving to the north and then northeast, Hattie began to slowly weaken due to increased wind shear. On October 7, Hattie lost typhoon intensity, and after tracking directly over Tokyo, transitioned into an extratropical cyclone on the next day.

Although the inner core of Typhoon Hattie stayed offshore Japan, torrential rains were accountable for 68 landslides through the country. A total of 1,100 homes were flooded. Three people were killed, one was reported missing and nineteen others were injured, including six in Kyoto. Elsewhere, power lines were downed in 1,035 spots in Okinawa, mostly from sugar cane, vegetables, and flowers. Nationwide, damage was estimated at $9.9 million (1990 USD).

== Meteorological history ==
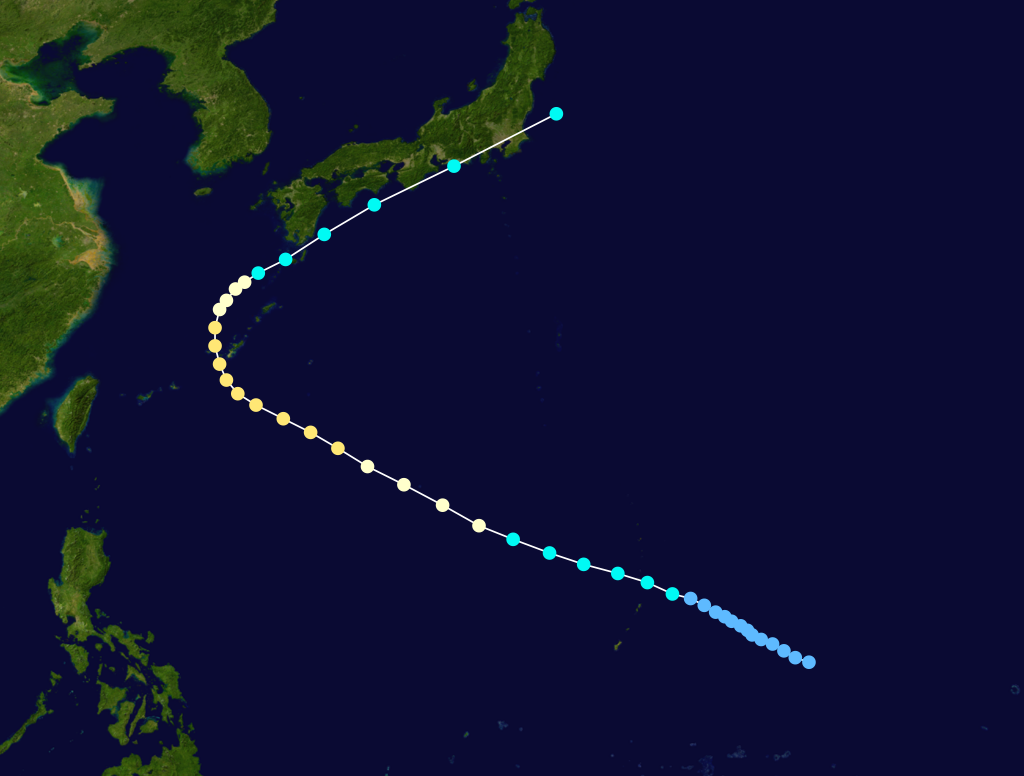
Map plotting the storm's track and intensity, according to the Saffir–Simpson scale Map key Saffir–Simpson scale Tropical depression (≤38 mph, ≤62 km/h) Tropical storm (39–73 mph, 63–118 km/h) Category 1 (74–95 mph, 119–153 km/h) Category 2 (96–110 mph, 154–177 km/h) Category 3 (111–129 mph, 178–208 km/h) Category 4 (130–156 mph, 209–251 km/h) Category 5 (≥157 mph, ≥252 km/h) Unknown Storm type Tropical cyclone Subtropical cyclone Extratropical cyclone, remnant low, tropical disturbance, or monsoon depression

While Typhoon Gene was recurving just offshore Japan, an area of disturbed weather first developed in the Western Pacific monsoon trough 185 km (115 mi) east of Guam. At 06:00 UTC on September 28, the Joint Typhoon Warning Center (JTWC) started tracking the system. Additional organization was limited by strong westerly winds aloft, but early on September 30, the Japan Meteorological Agency (JMA) upgraded the disturbance into a tropical depression. (Note: The Japan Meteorological Agency is the official Regional Specialized Meteorological Center for the western Pacific Ocean.) Thunderstorm activity subsequently flared up, and an hour later, the JTWC issued a Tropical Cyclone Formation Alert for the disturbance. The development of a central dense overcast prompted the JTWC to designate the system a tropical depression. By noon on October 1, its convective structure improved and shower activity had increased. Based on this, both the JTWC and JMA upgraded the depression into Tropical Storm Hattie. (Note: Wind estimates from the JMA and most other basins throughout the world are sustained over 10 minutes, while estimates from the United States-based Joint Typhoon Warning Center are sustained over 1 minute. 10-minute winds are about 1.14 times the amount of 1-minute winds.)

Tropical Storm Hattie tracked west-northwest at a steady pace. Meanwhile, Hattie began to intensify at the climatological rate of one Dvorak T-number per day due to decreased wind shear and improved upper-level outflow. Thunderstorm activity quickly consolidated around a reformed low-level circulation and the JMA upgraded Hattie into a severe tropical storm on October 2. Shortly thereafter, Hattie developed a small but distinct eye and based on satellite intensity estimates, Hattie was upgraded into a typhoon by both agencies. Later that day, the typhoon began to decelerate as it approached a break in the subtropical ridge to its north. Despite a decrease in cloud top temperatures surrounding the eye, normally a sign of weakening, increased Dvorak intensity estimates justified the JTWC raising the intensity of Hattie to 170 km/h (105 mph) at 00:00 UTC on October 4, equal to a mid-grade Category 2 hurricane on the United States-based Saffir-Simpson Hurricane Wind Scale. According to the JTWC, this would also be Hattie's highest maximum sustained wind. Twenty-four hours later, the JMA estimated that Hattie peaked in intensity, with winds of 145 km/h (90 mph) and a barometric pressure of 950 mbar (28 inHg).

On the evening of October 5, Typhoon Hattie began to recurve to the north, rounding the aforementioned ridge after passing through the Ryukyu Islands. The system maintained its intensity until that evening, when increasing wind shear aloft began to take toll on the cyclone. Shower and thunderstorm activity quickly decreased near the center, and both the JTWC and JMA agreed that Hattie lost typhoon intensity on the morning of October 7. Hattie then accelerated to the northeast, passing directly over Tokyo on October 8. After becoming devoid of all convection, the JTWC reported that Hattie had transitioned into an extratropical cyclone at 06:00 UTC that day. The JMA followed suit at roughly the same time, though the agency continued to track Hattie for an additional 18 hours.

== Impact ==
The typhoon dropped heavy rainfall across a majority of the Japanese archipelago. A peak rainfall total occurred of 503 mm (19.8 in) in the city of Ebino, Miyazaki, 454 mm (17.9 in) of which fell in a 24-hour time span and 81 mm (3.2 in) of which fell in an hour. A maximum wind gust of 115 km/h (71 mph) was recorded at Itokazu Castle.

In Okinawa, flights and ferry services were suspended. All schools and government offices were closed during the passage of Hattie. The storm, in conjunction with Typhoon Flo and Typhoon Gene, dropped 380 to 510 mm (15 to 20 in) of precipitation over Okinawa; this rainfall provided significant drought relief that forced officials to lift water rationing. Damage to military bases on Okinawa totaled to $1.6 million. Across Okinawa, power lines were downed in 1,035 spots and agricultural damage totaled to ¥926 million yen, mostly from sugar cane, vegetables, and flowers.

On the eastern end of Japan's Shikoku Island, in Tokushima Prefecture, 687 homes were damaged and an additional 121 houses were destroyed. There, three people were killed and 14 were wounded as the bus they were riding in was struck by a landslide. A block wall of a house collapsed in Nakamura, injuring one person. Throughout Kōchi Prefecture, 81 homes were damaged. Damage in the prefecture amounted to ¥279 million yen. Heavy rains in Miyazaki Prefecture triggered 11 landslides. There, 507 homes were damaged and 56 were destroyed, which resulted in 92 homeless. A total of 43 dwellings were partially damaged in Kagoshima Prefecture, including 13 near Nakafukura Station. Fifty-seven individuals lost their homes and two people were also injured. Ninety-three homes were damaged and three more homes were destroyed in Usuki. In Oita Prefecture, there were 10 landslides and roads were damaged in 15 locations. One person was also rendered missing. On the entire island of Kyushu, 136 flights and many ferry services were cancelled. On the Kii Peninsula, around 3,400 customers lost power in Shirahama, Susami, and Hikawagawa. Nine homes suffered damage in Osaka Prefecture. Three people were hurt in the city of Shizuoka after a tree fell on a train. In Kyoto, six train passengers were injured by flying glass when the typhoon's powerful winds toppled trees onto their coach. Across Mie Prefecture, sixteen dwellings were damaged and three more were flattened. Heavy rain associated with Hattie led to 68 landslides through the country. Extensive flooding affected 1,100 houses. Three people were killed, one was reported missing, and 19 others were injured. Damage was estimated at $9.9 million. (Note: All currencies are converted from Japanese yen to United States Dollars using this with an exchange rate of the year 1990.) (Note: All damage totals are in 1990 values of their respective currencies.)

== See also ==
- Typhoon Hal (1985)
