= List of storms named Heather =

The name Heather has been used for three tropical cyclones in the Eastern Pacific Ocean.

- Tropical Storm Heather (1969)
- Tropical Storm Heather (1973)
- Hurricane Heather (1977)

The name Heather has also been used for one cyclone in the Australian region.

- Tropical Cyclone Harriet–Heather (1992)
