= List of storms named Haima =

The name Haima (Mandarin: 海马, [xaɪ˧˩˧ mä˧˩˧]) was used to name three tropical cyclones in the West Pacific Ocean. The name, contributed by China, means seahorse in Mandarin.

- Tropical Storm Haima (2004) (T0420, 24W, Ofel) – made landfall south of Shanghai.
- Tropical Storm Haima (2011) (T1104, 06W, Egay) – made landfall, first in Zhanjiang, Guangdong, China, and later in landfall over Hanoi, Vietnam.
- Typhoon Haima (2016) (T1622, 25W, Lawin) – powerful category 5 super typhoon that made landfall in Peñablanca, Cagayan of the Philippines and in Haifeng County, Shanwei in the Guangdong province of China.

The name Haima was retired after the 2016 season and replaced with Mulan (Mandarin: 木兰, [mu˥˩ län˧˥]), which means magnolia in Mandarin. Mulan is also the name of a legendary Chinese folk heroine, Hua Mulan.

== See also ==
- Cyclone Halima (2022) – a South-West Indian Ocean tropical cyclone with a similar name.
