= Tropical Storm Helene (2000) =

Atlantic tropical storm in 2000

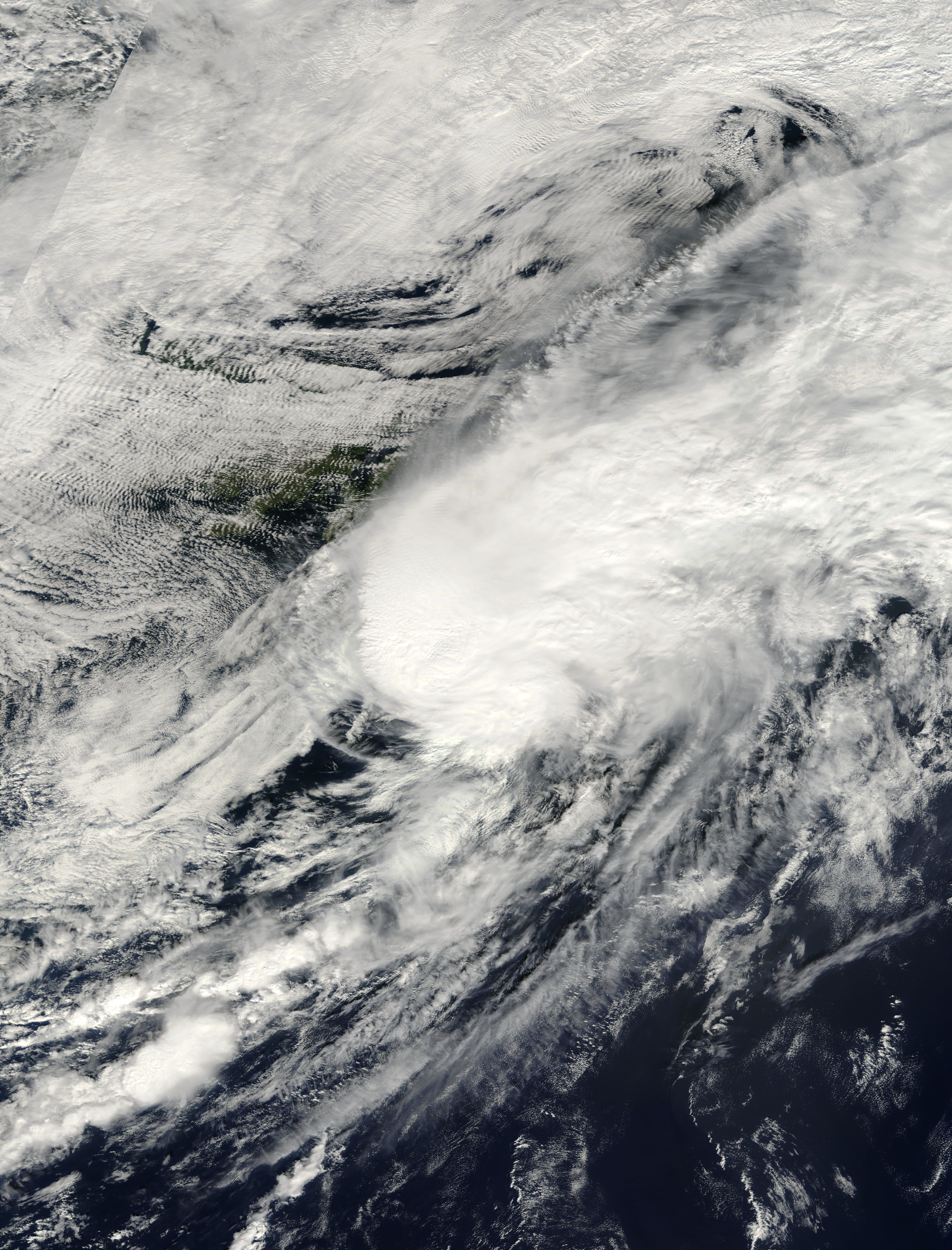
- Tropical Storm Helene at peak intensity south of Newfoundland on September 25

Meteorological history
- Formed: September 15, 2000
- Dissipated: September 25, 2000

Tropical storm
- 1-minute sustained (SSHWS/NWS)
- Highest winds: 70 mph (110 km/h)
- Lowest pressure: 986 mbar (hPa); 29.12 inHg

Overall effects
- Fatalities: 1 direct, 1 indirect
- Damage: $16 million (2000 USD)
- Areas affected: Lesser Antilles, Puerto Rico, Hispaniola, Jamaica, Cuba, Isle of Youth, Eastern United States, Atlantic Canada
- IBTrACS
- Part of the 2000 Atlantic hurricane season

Tropical Storm Helene was a long-lived tropical cyclone that oscillated for ten days between a tropical wave and a 70 mph (110 km/h) tropical storm. It was the twelfth tropical cyclone and eighth tropical storm of the 2000 Atlantic hurricane season, forming on September 15 east of the Windward Islands. After degenerating into a tropical wave, the system produced flooding and mudslides in Puerto Rico. It reformed into a tropical depression on September 19 south of Cuba, and crossed the western portion of the island the next day while on the verge of dissipation. However, it intensified into a tropical storm in the Gulf of Mexico, reaching its peak intensity while approaching the northern Gulf Coast.

The storm rapidly weakened before moving ashore near Fort Walton Beach, Florida on September 22. It produced heavy rainfall along the Florida Panhandle that reached 9.56 in (243 mm). The rains flooded hundreds of houses and caused the Sopchoppy River to reach a record crest. Gusty winds left about 5,000 people without power, though the rains alleviated drought conditions. In South Carolina, Helene spawned a tornado that killed one person and injured six others; heavy rainfall in the state also led to a death when a driver hydroplaned into a tree. The rainfall extended northeastward into Delaware. Overall damage in the United States was estimated at $16 million. Helene emerged from North Carolina as a tropical storm, and re-intensified to near-hurricane strength before being absorbed by a cold front on September 25.

== Meteorological history ==
Map plotting the storm's track and intensity, according to the Saffir–Simpson scale Map key Saffir–Simpson scale Tropical depression (≤38 mph, ≤62 km/h) Tropical storm (39–73 mph, 63–118 km/h) Category 1 (74–95 mph, 119–153 km/h) Category 2 (96–110 mph, 154–177 km/h) Category 3 (111–129 mph, 178–208 km/h) Category 4 (130–156 mph, 209–251 km/h) Category 5 (≥157 mph, ≥252 km/h) Unknown Storm type Tropical cyclone Subtropical cyclone Extratropical cyclone, remnant low, tropical disturbance, or monsoon depression

A tropical wave moved off the African coast on September 10. Shortly thereafter, it lost most of its atmospheric convection and initially showed few signs of development as it moved westward. On September 14, convection reformed near the center of the system. It continued to organize, and the next day the National Hurricane Center (NHC) classified it as Tropical Depression Twelve. At the time, it was located 470 mi (765 km) east of the Leeward Islands. By this point, the depression had a weak circulation and ragged convection. An anticyclone to its north caused the depression to move generally to the west, and upper-level conditions were forecast to be favorable for intensification. However, the circulation moved away from the main area of convection before a Hurricane Hunters flight indicated that the depression degenerated into a tropical wave on September 16. Although there was not a closed circulation, the flight observed flight-level winds of 65 mph (105 km/h) to the north and east of the system.

The remnants of the depression continued westward, moving through the Lesser Antilles on September 17. Despite favorable conditions for redevelopment including low wind shear and warm ocean temperatures, the system remained a tropical wave as it moved across the Caribbean Sea. Late on September 19, another reconnaissance plane discovered a closed circulation to the northwest of Grand Cayman. Although there was minimal convection near the center, it organized enough to be re-classified as a tropical depression. Upon redeveloping, the depression was moved west-northwestward around a large anticyclone to the east of Florida. Its circulation was broad, though the NHC anticipated further strengthening. Conditions remained favorable for intensification, but instead the depression weakened as it approached Cuba. Around 1200 UTC on September 20, it moved across the western tip of Cuba into the Gulf of Mexico with minimal thunderstorms near the center. A few hours later, the NHC noted that "the cyclone [was] on the verge of breaking open into an east-west oriented trough". The agency did not discontinue advisories due to an increase in convection near the center, although no intensification was expected. However, the system's circulation and convection became better organized, and early on September 21 the NHC upgraded the depression to Tropical Storm Helene.

Tropical Storm Helene near its initial peak intensity on September 21

Upon becoming a tropical storm, Helene gradually turned to the north while rounding an anticyclone to its east. It rapidly intensified after its upgrade, and reached its peak intensity of 70 mph (110 km/h) late on September 21. The storm was small with an asymmetric wind field, and wind shear displaced the circulation from the deep convection. Increasing wind shear prevented Helene from attaining hurricane status, and the storm began weakening on September 22 as it approached the northern Gulf Coast. By 0900 UTC that day, strong wind shear moved the convection away from the center and toward the north and northeast. This prompted NHC forecaster Lixion Avila to remark, "If I did not have a reconnaissance plane in the area, I would not know there was a tropical cyclone by just observing IR satellite imagery." The storm made landfall near Fort Walton Beach, Florida at 1200 UTC on September 22 after weakening from its peak intensity to winds of 40 mph (64 km/h).

After moving ashore, an area of convection redeveloped over Helene's center and the circulation became well-defined on radar imagery. The storm accelerated to the northeast into the Westerlies, and about six hours following its landfall, Helene weakened to tropical depression status after crossing into southeastern Alabama. A few hours later, the NHC issued the last advisory on the system and transferred warnings to the Hydrometeorological Prediction Center. Hurricane forecast models anticipated restrengthening, and due to the forecast track north of the Gulf Stream, the NHC predicted intensification as an extratropical cyclone. The agency noted that 1997's Tropical Storm Danny re-intensified in the same region as a tropical cyclone. Despite strong wind shear, convection increased over Helene's center as the storm moved through North Carolina. Stations along the Outer Banks reported sustained winds up to 59 mph (95 km/h). Satellite imagery and buoy data indicated that Helene re-intensified into a tropical storm inland over North Carolina. The storm emerged from the Virginia coast into an area of less wind shear, where conditions were thus more favorable for strengthening. The storm became compact over the northern Atlantic Ocean, with a diameter of 140 mi (230 km). Strong convection developed over the center on September 24, and the following day Helene re-attained its peak intensity of 70 mph (110 km/h) while southeast of Nova Scotia. The wind estimate was based on observations from the Neptune Olivine, a nearby ship that recorded 64 mph (103 km/h) winds and a barometric pressure of 988 mbar (29.2 inHg); because the ship was located to the south of the center, the storm's minimum pressure was estimated at 986 mbar (29.1 inHg). Helene continued moving rapidly to the east-northeast, and late on September 25 dissipated as it was absorbed by a cold front.

== Preparations and impact ==
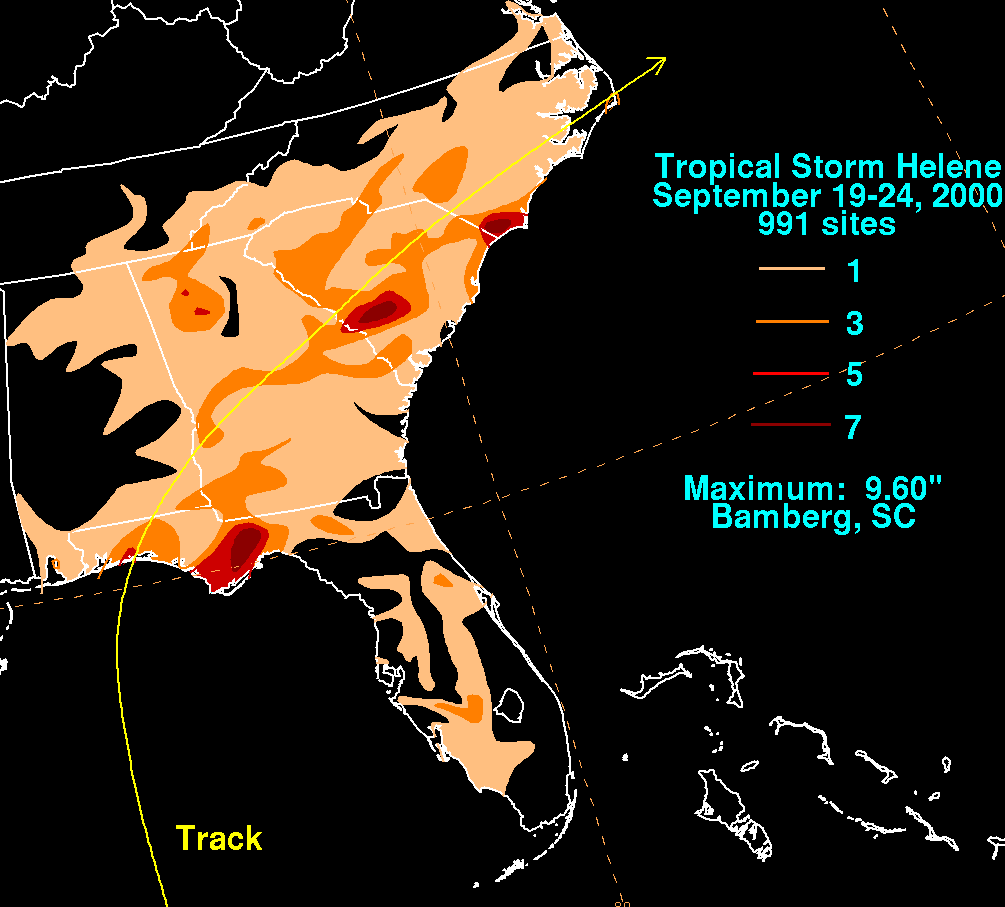
Total rainfall of Helene across the Southeastern U.S.

=== Caribbean ===
When Tropical Depression Twelve first formed, several governments across the Lesser Antilles issued a tropical storm watch, including the SSS islands, Antigua and Barbuda, Anguilla, Montserrat, and Saint Kitts and Nevis. The watch was discontinued after the depression degenerated into a tropical wave. As a tropical wave, Helene moved through the Lesser Antilles with strong winds; gusts on Guadeloupe reached 55 mph (89 km/h). The system also produced heavy rainfall, reaching 3.14 in (80 mm) on Antigua. The wave passed to the south of Puerto Rico on September 17 and 18. Across the southern and eastern portion of the island, the system produced 6 to 12 in (150 to 300 mm) of rainfall, which resulted in flash flooding and mudslides. One house was destroyed and more than 100 houses were affected in Ponce, forcing several families to evacuate. The flooding also destroyed a bridge in Guayama and made many roads impassable. Damage on the island was estimated at $100,000 (2000 USD). After the system redeveloped into a tropical depression, the government of Cuba issued a tropical storm warning for the provinces of Isla de la Juventud, Havana, and Pinar del Río, as well as for the city of Havana.

=== United States ===
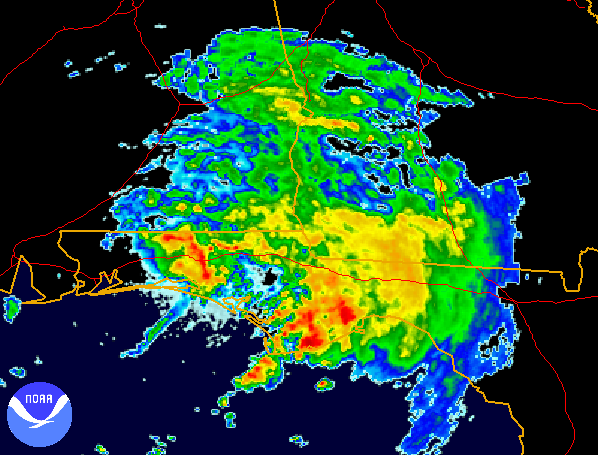
Radar image of Tropical Storm Helene shortly after making landfall

About 21 hours before Helene made landfall, the NHC issued a tropical storm warning from the border of Louisiana and Mississippi to the mouth of the Aucilla River along the Florida Panhandle. Six hours later, the agency also issued a hurricane watch from the border of Florida and Alabama to the mouth of the Aucilla River. The day before the storm moved ashore, local American Red Cross chapters had 18 emergency shelters on standby to house storm evacuees. One shelter opened in Tallahassee and one in Apalachicola. About 130 people evacuated to shelters in the western portion of the Florida panhandle and planes evacuated military bases in the region. Government buildings were closed in Okaloosa, and schools were closed in Okaloosa, Walton, and Santa Rosa counties.

Despite being a weak tropical cyclone at landfall, Tropical Storm Helene caused $16 million in damage (2000 USD). In Alabama, wind gusts reached 36 mph (58 km/h) at Brookley Air Force Base in Mobile; the same station recorded the highest rainfall in the state, with a total of 1.08 in (27 mm). The storm also caused minor beach erosion and coastal damage along Dauphin Island.

In neighboring Florida, the storm dropped heavy rainfall along the panhandle, peaking at 9.56 in (243 mm) in Apalachicola. The rains caused flooding, notably in Franklin, Wakulla, and Leon counties, all of which closed schools and public buildings. Flood warnings were issued for areas affected by Tropical Storm Gordon five days prior. High rainfall caused the Sopchoppy River to exceed its banks and reach a record crest of 34.9 ft (10.6 m), breaking the previous record set in 1970. Several homes and nearby roads were flooded near the river. About 100 homes were flooded in Leon County, and 70 streets were flooded in Tallahassee. Portions of U.S. Highway 98 were flooded in Port St. Joe and near Carrabelle. About 70 people had to evacuate their homes due to the flooding. Flooding was minimal in the western Florida panhandle due to drought conditions the previous summer. Sustained winds across the state peaked at 30 mph (48 km/h), though gusts reached 45 mph (72 km/h) at Cape San Blas. At that location, there was over $100,000 in road damage and beach loss. The winds combined with the heavy rainfall caused trees to fall onto power lines, leaving about 5,000 people without electricity. The storm spawned 6 tornadoes along the panhandle, one of which destroyed several mobile homes in Wakulla. As the storm moved ashore, tides were less than 2 ft (0.61 m) above normal, but were high enough to cause minor beach erosion. In Leon County, the storm destroyed two homes and six mobile homes, and damaged more than 120 homes in Wakulla County.

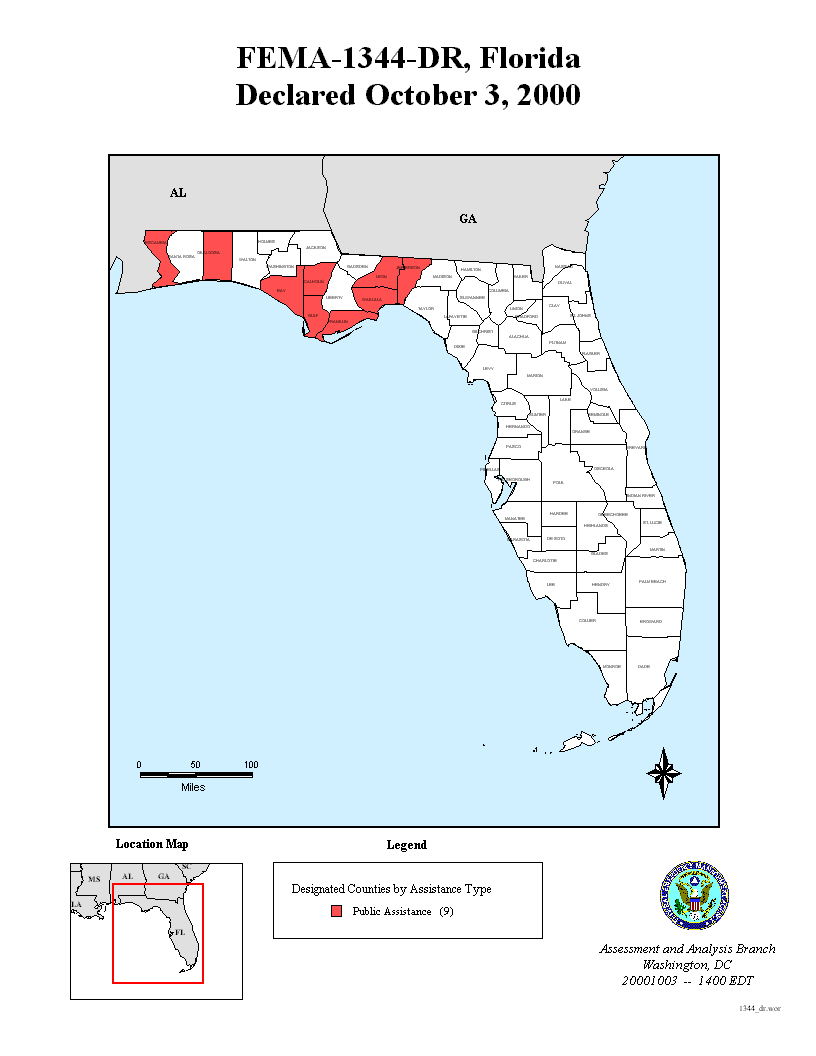
Counties eligible for public assistance

When Helene moved through Georgia, it had sustained winds of around 30 mph (48 km/h), with higher gusts. It dropped heavy rainfall along its path, with a statewide peak of 5.13 in (130 mm) in Dunwoody. The rainfall alleviated persistent drought conditions across the state. However, the combination of winds and rainfall downed trees and power lines; one falling tree damaged a car in Sandersville. To the northwest of Georgia, rainfall spread into Tennessee, reaching 3.12 in (79 mm) in Copperhill. As Helene moved through South Carolina, it spawned an F2 tornado in Martin that killed one person, injured six, and damaged 12 houses. The highest rainfall in the United States associated with Helene was a total of 9.60 in (244 mm) in Bamberg, though weather radar images estimated totals of up to 14 in (360 mm). The rains caused flooding along Highway 47, in nearby Orangeburg County where 5.3 in (130 mm) were recorded. In Berkeley County, a woman died after hydroplaning and driving her car into a tree.

Rainfall in North Carolina peaked at 8.31 in (211 mm) in Longwood; in Jacksonville, the precipitation caused street flooding. Off the shore of North Carolina, a station at Diamond Shoal Light reported wind gusts of 70 mph (110 km/h) while Helene was re-intensifying into a tropical storm. Along the coast, the highest gusts were 52 mph (84 km/h), reported at both Cape Lookout and Duck. Rainfall from the storm extended through Virginia and into Delaware.

=== Canada ===
After re-intensifying into a tropical storm for a second time, Helene passed to the southeast of Atlantic Canada. Although its strongest winds remained offshore, the outer rainbands dropped light precipitation, peaking at 0.89 in (22.5 mm) in eastern Nova Scotia, and 1.18 in (30 mm) in southeastern Newfoundland.

== Aftermath ==
On October 3, United States President Bill Clinton declared nine Florida counties as disaster areas, which allocated federal funding for debris removal, emergency services, and restoration of damaged public facilities. In Franklin County, many residents had to boil water before consumption due to contaminated water wells. As a result, the local Red Cross chapter provided water bottles to the affected residents. The Red Cross also deployed two Mobile Feeding Vehicles to Wakulla County, and a total of 700 meals were ultimately distributed.

== See also ==
- Tropical cyclones in 2000
- List of Florida hurricanes (2000-present)
- List of North Carolina hurricanes (2000–present)
