= Cyclone Heidi =

Tropical cyclone in 2012

Severe Tropical Cyclone Heidi
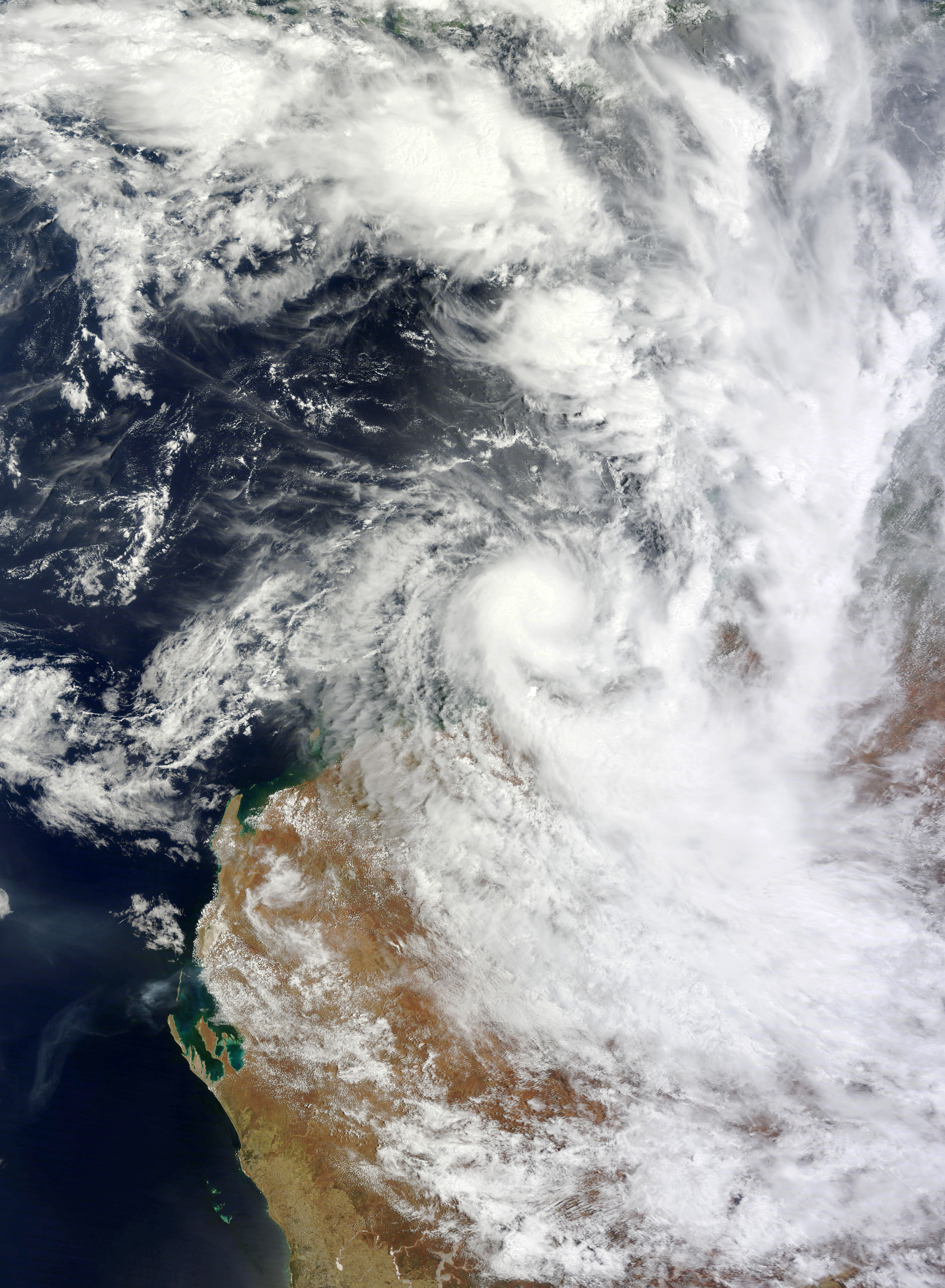
- Heidi on January 11

Meteorological history
- Formed: 9 January 2012
- Dissipated: 13 January 2012

Category 3 severe tropical cyclone
- 10-minute sustained (BOM)
- Highest winds: 150 km/h (90 mph)
- Highest gusts: 205 km/h (125 mph)
- Lowest pressure: 960 hPa (mbar); 28.35 inHg

Category 1-equivalent tropical cyclone
- 1-minute sustained (SSHWS/JTWC)
- Highest winds: 120 km/h (75 mph)
- Lowest pressure: 974 hPa (mbar); 28.76 inHg

Overall effects
- Fatalities: None
- Damage: Minor
- Areas affected: Western Australia
- Part of the 2011–12 Australian region cyclone season

Severe Tropical Cyclone Heidi was a small and strong tropical cyclone that struck Western Australia in January 2012. The seventh tropical low, third tropical cyclone, and second severe tropical cyclone of the 2011–12 Australian region cyclone season, Heidi developed from a tropical low that formed to the south of Indonesia on 9 January, before strengthening into a Category 1 tropical cyclone on the following day. Tracking southward towards the Pilbara coast in a favourable environment, Heidi rapidly intensified and attained Category 3 severe tropical cyclone status on 11 January. After making landfall at peak intensity later that day with estimated winds of 150 km/h (95 mph), Heidi rapidly weakened, dissipating over Western Australia by 13 January.

In advance of Heidi's arrival, the Port of Port Hedland, offshore and coastal oil rigs and iron mines were shut and workers moved out of the area. Alerts were issued for much of the Pilbara coast, and the Port Hedland International Airport was shut. Heidi dropped heavy rainfall across the Pilbara and West Kimberley regions in Western Australia, with a maximum accumulation of 168.5 millimetres (6.63 in) being reported at Pardoo Station. These heavy rains lead to minor flooding on roads in the region. In addition, strong winds knocked out winds and caused major power outages in South Hedland and Wedgefield. Overall, Heidi caused only minor damage and no deaths; nonetheless, the name Heidi was later retired from the rotating list of storm names assigned by the Bureau of Meteorology.

== Meteorological history ==
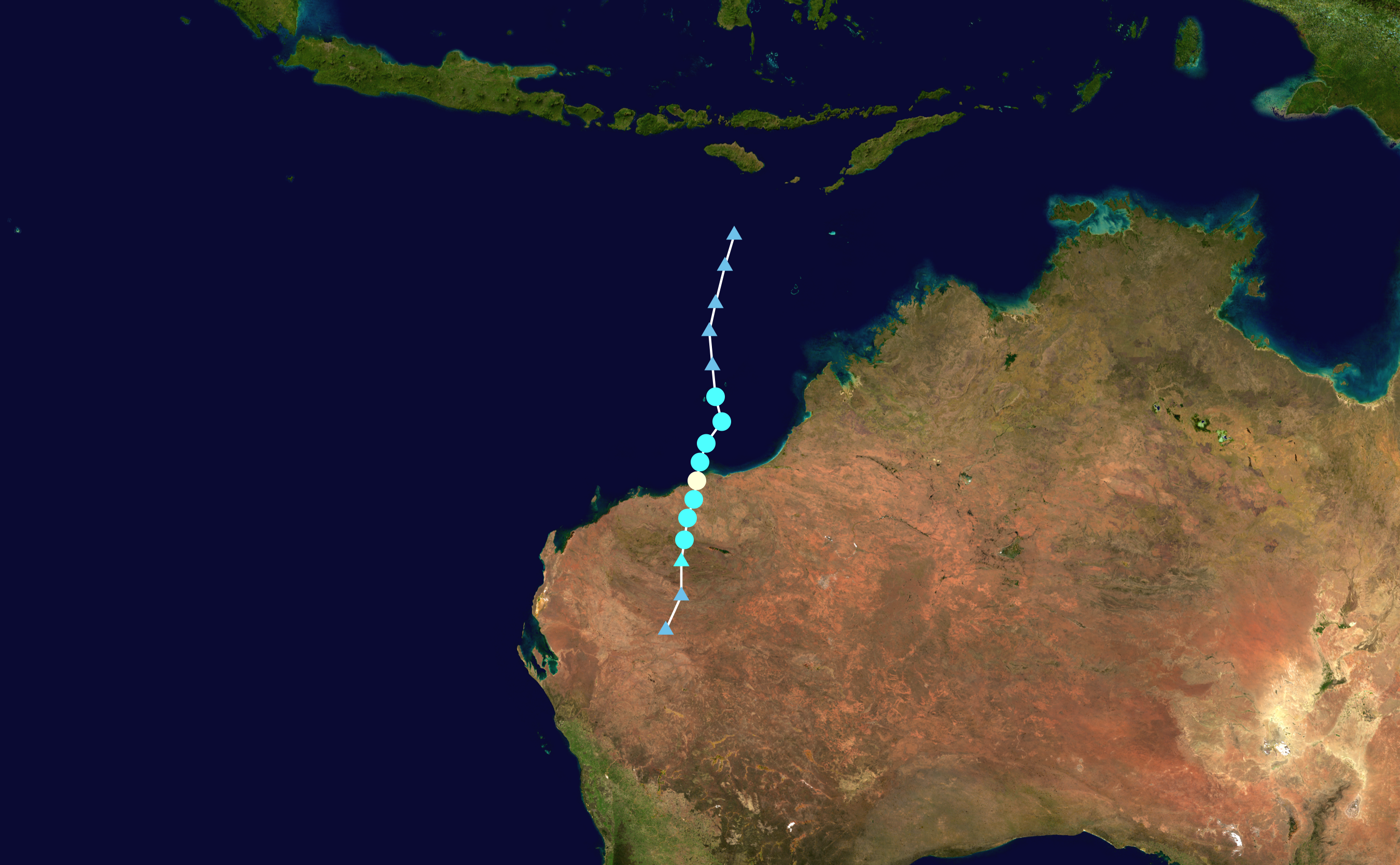
Map plotting the storm's track and intensity, according to the Saffir–Simpson scale Map key Saffir–Simpson scale Tropical depression (≤38 mph, ≤62 km/h) Tropical storm (39–73 mph, 63–118 km/h) Category 1 (74–95 mph, 119–153 km/h) Category 2 (96–110 mph, 154–177 km/h) Category 3 (111–129 mph, 178–208 km/h) Category 4 (130–156 mph, 209–251 km/h) Category 5 (≥157 mph, ≥252 km/h) Unknown Storm type Tropical cyclone Subtropical cyclone Extratropical cyclone, remnant low, tropical disturbance, or monsoon depression

The origins of Heidi can be traced to a tropical low that was first noted by TCWC Perth about 290 km (180 mi) south of Sawu, Indonesia on 9 January 2012. Located in an environment favourable for development, characterised by low northerly wind shear, divergence due to an upper-level trough to the south over central Western Australia, good poleward outflow to the south and sea surface temperatures (SSTs) of 28 to 31 °C till the Pilbara coast, the low tracked southwards quickly and intensified into a Category 1 tropical cyclone at 1200 UTC on 10 January. The Joint Typhoon Warning Center (JTWC) estimated that Heidi intensified into a tropical storm six hours later. When it first developed, Heidi was a small tropical cyclone, with gale-force winds extending 120 km (75 mi) outward from the centre of the cyclone.

Owing to the highly favourable environment and its small size, Heidi rapidly intensified after genesis. The system continued to track southwards while decelerating and contracting in size, and intensified to Category 2 strength six hours after being named. Heidi intensified into a Category 3 severe tropical cyclone at 1200 UTC on January 11, and six hours later attained its peak intensity with ten-minute sustained winds of 150 km/h (95 mph) and an estimated minimum central pressure of 960 mbar (hPa). At the same time, the JTWC estimated Heidi to have one-minute sustained winds of 120 km/h (75 mph). Heidi made landfall about 15 km (10 mi) east of Port Hedland a couple of hours later at peak intensity. At landfall, gale-force winds extended only 55 km (35 mi) outwards from the centre of the tropical cyclone. Heidi rapidly weakened over land: the cyclone fell to Category 2 strength within ten hours of landfall, and the system weakened to Category 1 strength in another six hours. Heidi weakened into a tropical low by 1800 UTC on January 12, which was last noted by TCWC Perth as well as the JTWC 12 hours later.

== Preparations and impact ==
In advance of the approach of Heidi, the BoM issued a cyclone warning for the coast from Sandfire to Mardie. The Karijini National Park was shut, and the Port of Port Hedland was cleared and shut formally by 2 a.m. on 11 January. Non-essential port and construction workers were moved out and iron mines in the Pilbara coast were shut in preparation for Heidi. Oil rigs offshore and along the Pilbara coast halted their activities in the lead-up to Heidi. The Port Hedland International Airport was shut, and Qantas cancelled two afternoon return services. The 300 affected passengers were provided with one night's accommodation by the carrier. A red alert was issued by the BoM for the coast between Pardoo and Whim Creek, and a blue alert for island communities between Whim Creek and Dampier. The residents of Port Hedland were advised to immediately seek shelter, and people in the surrounding areas were urged to gather food, water, torches, portable radios and first aid kits. Residents from Port Hedland to Wallal were warned against storm surge that could inundate low-lying areas. About 45 people took shelter in a relocation centre in South Hedland overnight.

The small, destructive core of Heidi missed Port Hedland to the east. Nonetheless, very strong winds and heavy rainfall caused minor flooding and power outages, and trees were uprooted across properties. According to Horizon Power, more than 3,500 homes and businesses in Port Hedland lost power due to Heidi. Though the threat of the storm surge did not eventuate as the storm slowed before landfall and as landfall occurred more than four hours after the high tide, heavy rainfall of over 100 mm (3.9 in) led to flooding in the region. 168.5 mm (6.63 in) of rainfall was reported in 24 hours at Pardoo Station, while Port Hedland Aerodrome recorded 108.4 mm (4.27 in) of rain. Overall, damage due to Heidi was relatively minor, and no casualties were reported.

The name Heidi was retired by the Bureau of Meteorology from the rotating list of names used for tropical cyclones in the Australian region following the season, and replaced with Hayley which got used for the first time in 2025.

== See also ==
- Cyclone George (2007) – the last tropical cyclone to impact the Pilbara coast before Heidi.
- Cyclone Christine (2013) – impacted the Pilbara coast the following year.
