= List of storms named Holly =

The name Holly has been used for two tropical cyclones in the Atlantic Ocean and three in the West Pacific Ocean.

In the Atlantic:

- Hurricane Holly (1969) – minimal hurricane that moved through the Lesser Antilles as a tropical depression
- Hurricane Holly (1976) – minimal hurricane that remained over open waters

In the West Pacific:

- Tropical Storm Holly (1981) (T8103, 03W) – moderate tropical storm which formed and remained fairly close to the equator throughout its duration
- Typhoon Holly (1984) (T8410, 11W, Isang) – brought heavy rainfall and caused severe damage to the Korean Peninsula, causing one death
- Typhoon Holly (1987) (T8715, 15W) – attained super typhoon status, but remained away from land

== See also ==
- Tropical Storm Hali (1992) – a Central Pacific tropical storm with a similar name
