= Hester (disambiguation) =

Hester is a given name and a surname.

Hester may also refer to:

- Hester (novel), an 1883 novel by Margaret Oliphant
- Hester, Western Australia, a small town in the south west of the state
- Hester Avenue, a road in Perth, Western Australia
- Hester Brook, Western Australia, a locality in Western Australia
- Hester Site, an archaeological site in Monroe County, Mississippi
- Hester, Missouri, an unincorporated community in northern Marion County
- Hester, Louisiana, an unincorporated community and census-designated place in St. James Parish
- Hester Street (Manhattan), a street in New York
- Any of 10 tropical storms

== See also ==
- Hester v. United States, a 1924 Supreme Court decision
- Hesters Way, an area in Cheltenham, Gloucestershire, England
