= List of storms named Hester =

The name Hester has been used for ten tropical cyclones in the Northwestern Pacific Ocean.

- Typhoon Hester (1949) – a Category 3 typhoon that minimal affected Japan.
- Typhoon Hester (1952) – a Category 5 typhoon that affected Marshall Islands and Guam.
- Typhoon Hester (1957) – a Category 4 typhoon with no effect on land.
- Tropical Storm Hester (1960) – remained over the open ocean.
- Tropical Storm Hester (1963) – remained over the open ocean.
- Typhoon Hester (1966) – remained over the open ocean.
- Tropical Storm Hester (1968) – a strong tropical storm that made landfall South Vietnam.
- Typhoon Hester (1971) – was regarded as one of the most destructive storms to strike Vietnam since 1944.
- Tropical Storm Hester (1974) – a weak tropical storm formed in the South China Sea that made landfall Vietnam.
- Tropical Storm Hester (1978) – remained over the open ocean.
