= 1949 Pacific typhoon season =

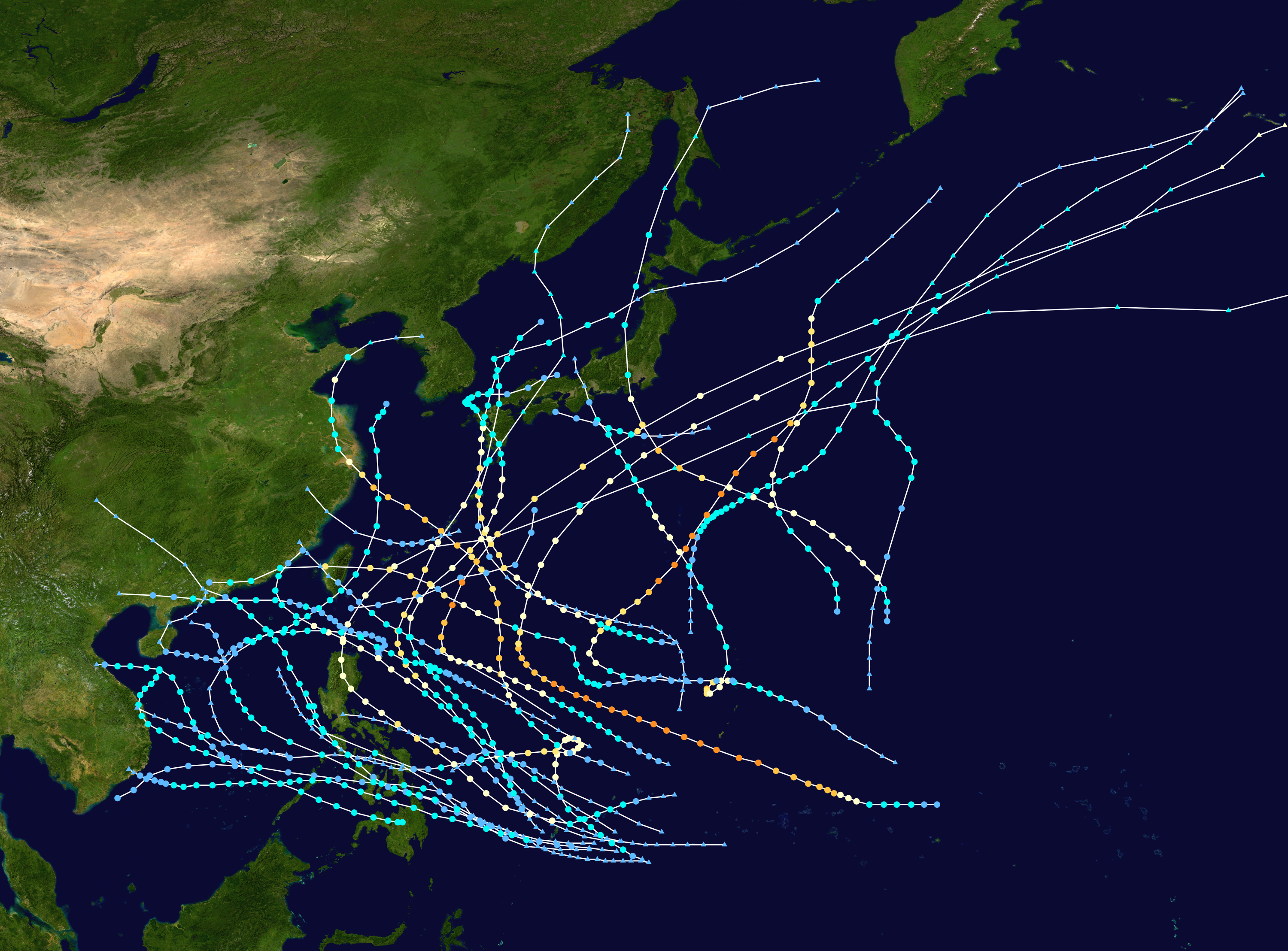
- Season summary map

Seasonal boundaries
- First system formed: January 13, 1949
- Last system dissipated: December 14, 1949

Strongest storm
- Name: Allyn
  - Maximum winds: 230 km/h (145 mph) (1-minute sustained)
  - Lowest pressure: 884 hPa (mbar)

Seasonal statistics
- Total depressions: 34
- Total storms: 22, 6 unofficial
- Typhoons: 14
- Super typhoons: 0 (unofficial)
- Total fatalities: At least 1,790
- Total damage: > $127 million (1949 USD)

Related articles
- 1949 Atlantic hurricane season; 1949 Pacific hurricane season; 1940s North Indian Ocean cyclone seasons

The 1949 Pacific typhoon season has no official bounds; it ran year-round in 1949, but most tropical cyclones tend to form in the northwestern Pacific Ocean between June and December. These dates conventionally delimit the period of each year when most tropical cyclones form in the northwestern Pacific Ocean.

The scope of this article is limited to the Pacific Ocean, north of the equator and west of the International Date Line. Storms that form east of the date line and north of the equator are called hurricanes; see 1949 Pacific hurricane season. At the time, tropical storms that formed within this region of the western Pacific were identified and named by the United States Armed Services, and these names are taken from the list that USAS publicly adopted before the 1945 season started.

== Season summary ==
In July, tropical storm Irma killed 1,600 people and destroyed more than 63,000 houses in Shanghai, China, the worst typhoon on record in the city.

Typhoon Gloria struck Okinawa on July 23. Gloria killed 38 people and destroyed 42,502 buildings on the island. Typhoon Gloria then continued westward and struck Shanghai, China killing 29 people.

Typhoon Kitty struck the Tokyo/Yokohama area August 31 through September 1, 1949. From reconnaissance reports the maximum sustained winds were near 110 knots 12 hours prior to landfall, but had fallen to minimum typhoon strength by the time it reached Honshū. The death toll reached 123 due to rainfall induced flooding and landslides (NY Times, 9/3/1949), and caused about 15 billion yen in damages. As its center passed near Tokyo, the JMA's Central Meteorological Office was able to launch eight rawinsondes in the typhoon environment. Researcher Dr. Hidedoshi Arakawa was able to analyze these soundings to make a vertical analysis of the storm.

== Systems ==
=== Typhoon Carmen ===
- Typhoon (JMA)
- Category 2 typhoon (SSHWS)
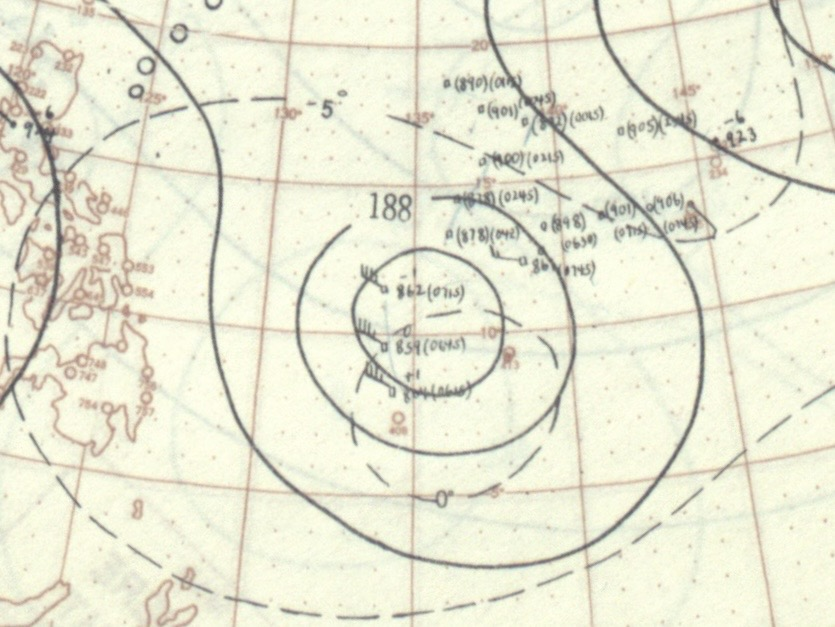
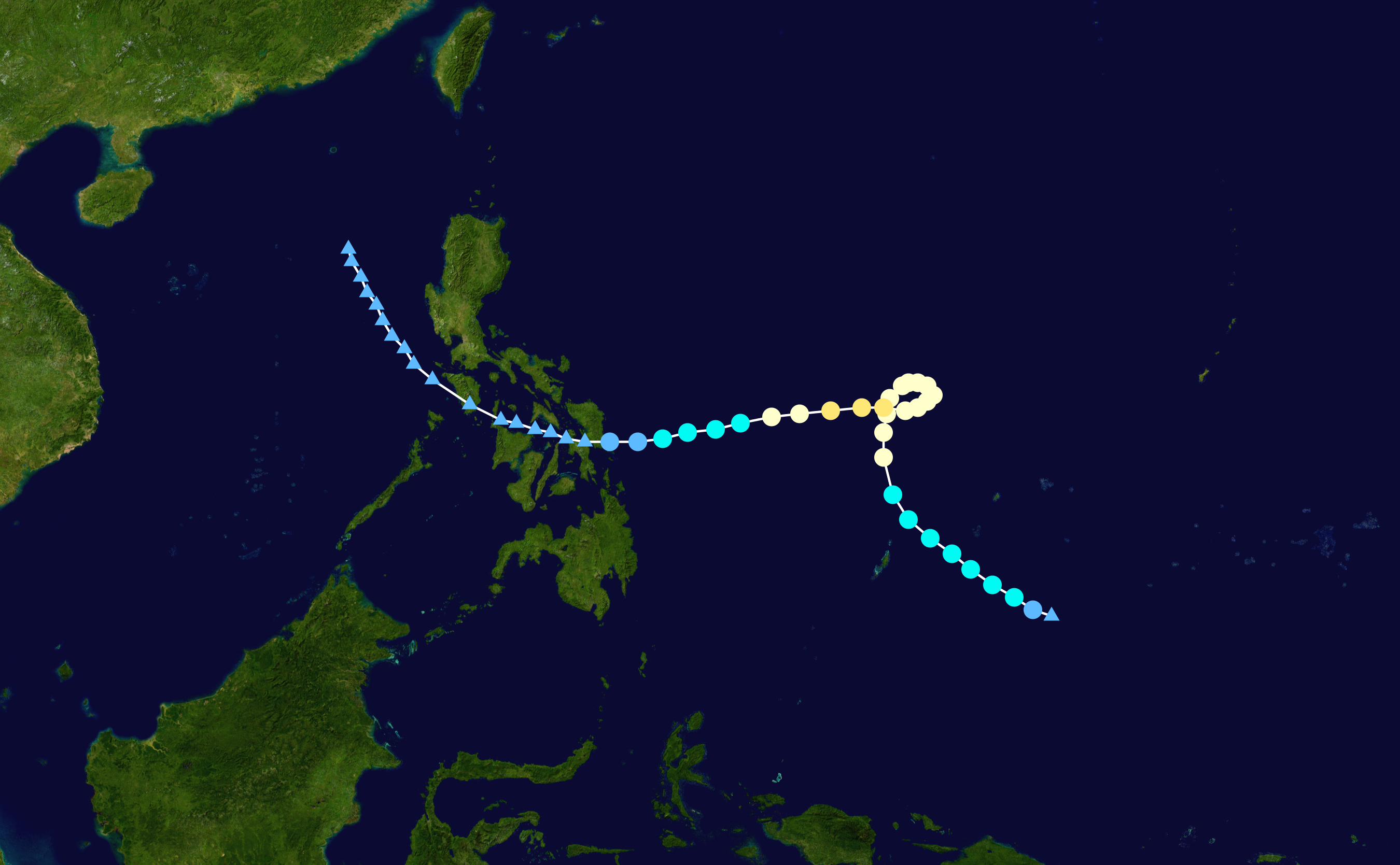
- Duration: January 13 – January 20
- Peak intensity: 155 km/h (100 mph) (1-min); 970 hPa (mbar)

Carmen's origin was traced to the southeast of Yap, at the junction of the base of a westerly trough and a secondary line of convergence associated with the Inter-tropical trough. Its track was followed south of Yap and northwest between Yap and Palau. Much speculation was afforded when three reconnaissance fixes indicated a loop in Carmen's path. Indications were that Carmen was a very small storm in the respect that high winds and weather extended only a short distance from its center. An allowance for navigational error along with a 48-hour stagnation would have discounted the unusual recurvature. The final leg pursued a southwest course into Mindanao, the result of the Siberian high cell's intrusion into the Philippine Sea.

=== Typhoon Della ===
- Typhoon (JMA)
- Category 3 typhoon (SSHWS)
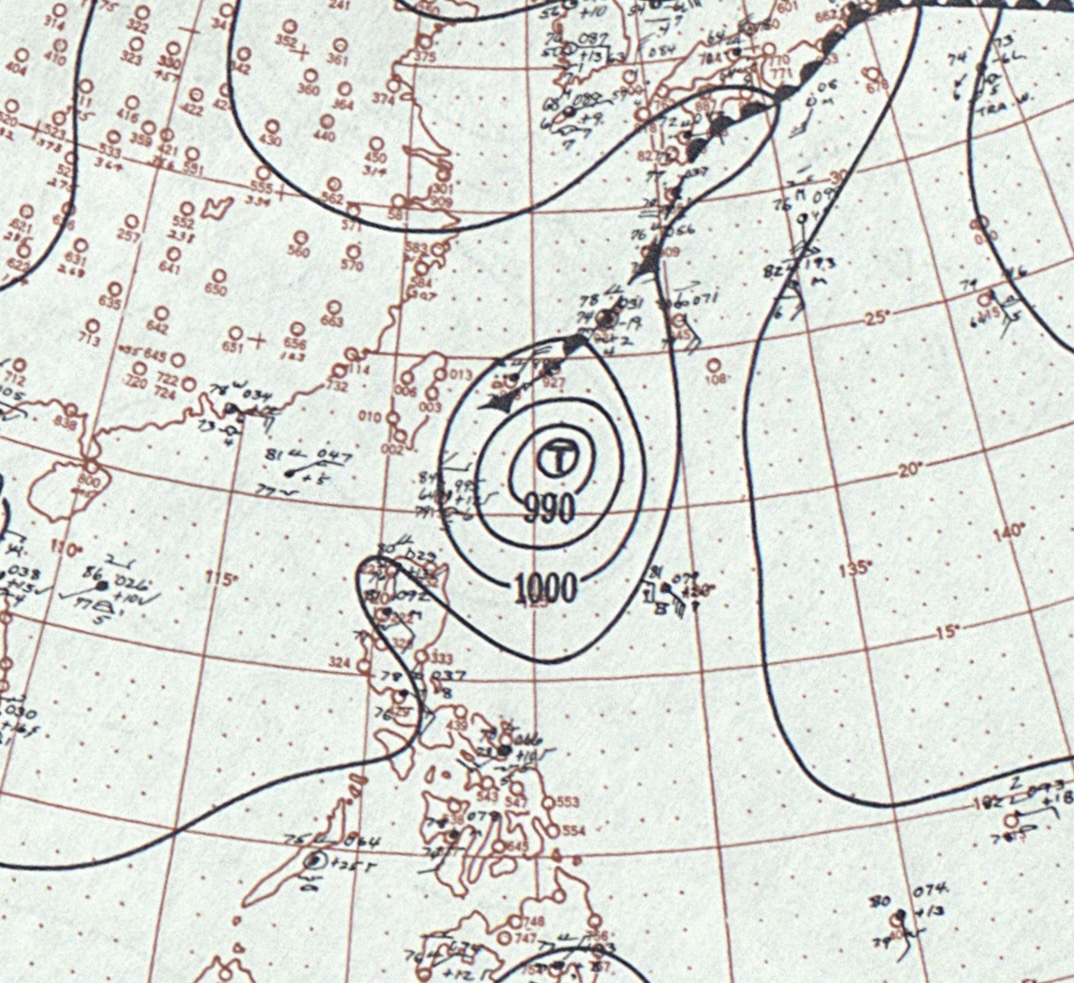
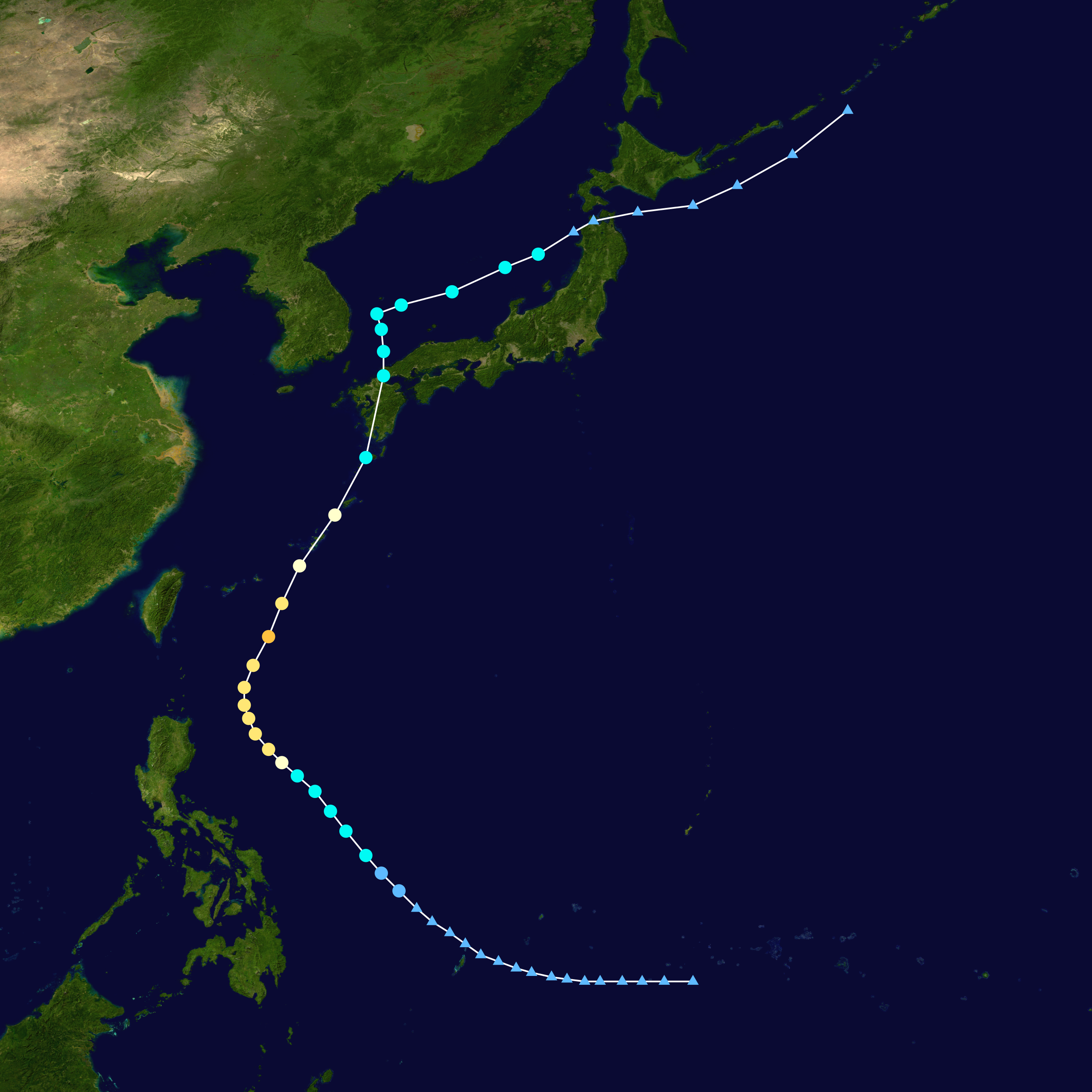
- Duration: June 16 – June 22
- Peak intensity: 185 km/h (115 mph) (1-min); 952 hPa (mbar)

Della began as an easterly wave and can be traced as far east as Truk with consistence. Kwajalein shows the passage also, but its track to Truk is indistinct. The eventual track was substantiated by data at Guam and Yap with intensification evident near 15 N and 127 E, seven days after the easterly wave passage at Truk. A surge of moist unstable air from the south was considered as the primary factor in intensification. A parabolic path was followed, with the eye passing over Okinawa. Contrary to climatological data, Della pursued a path across Kyishi rather than the conventional movement along the polar trough to the south of Japan. Della moved into the Sea of Japan and became extratropical four days after it was detected as a typhoon

=== Tropical Storm Elaine ===
- Typhoon (JMA)
- Tropical storm (SSHWS)
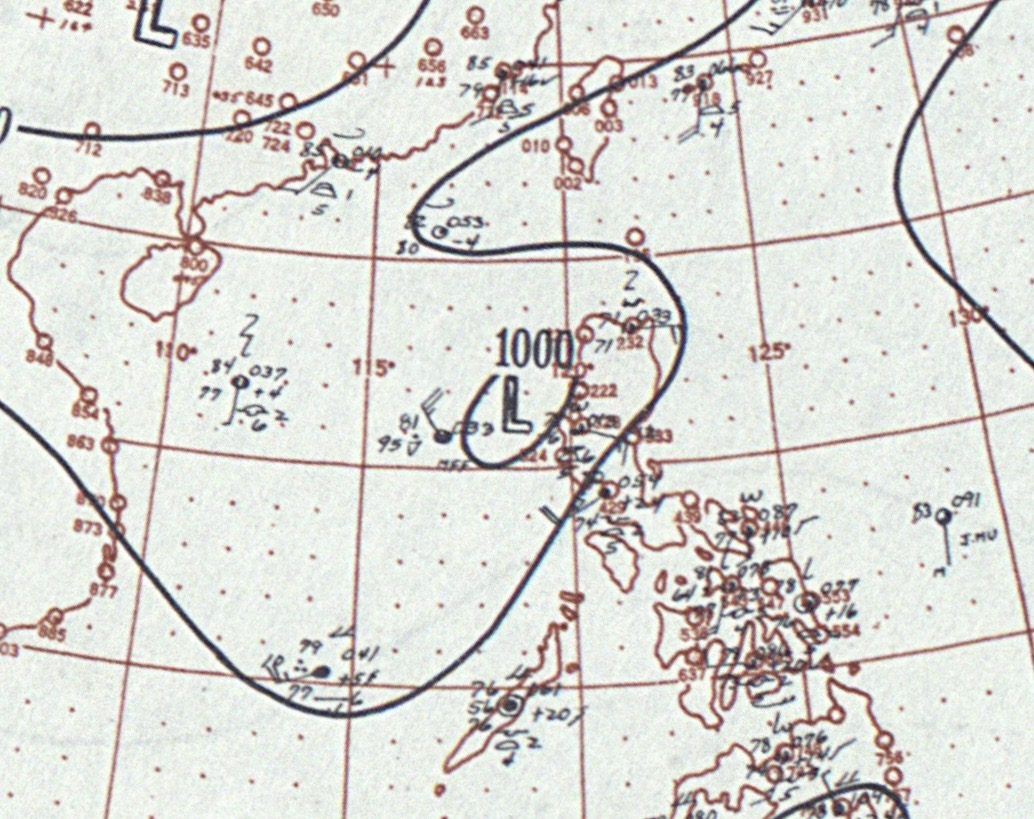
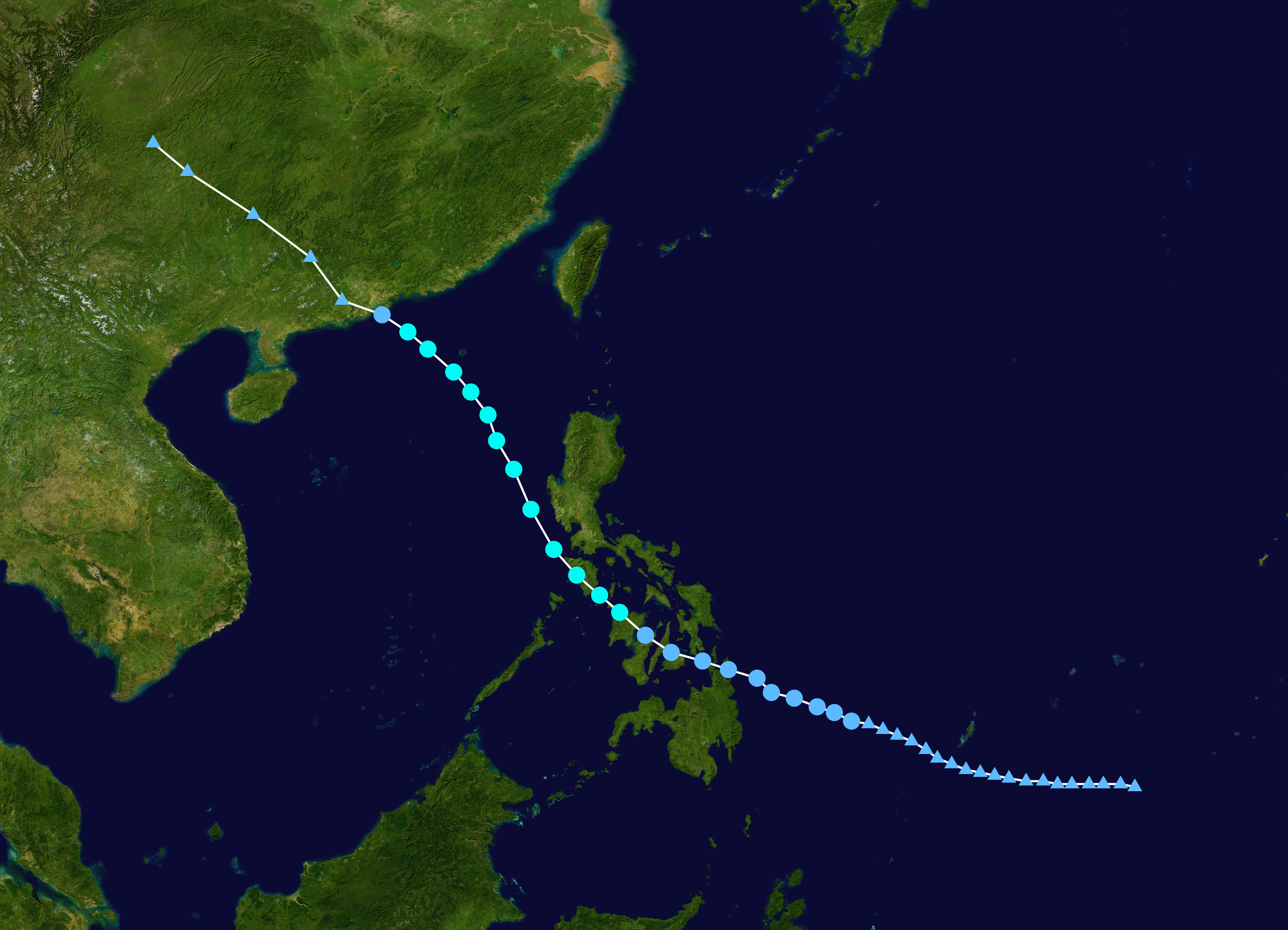
- Duration: July 4 – July 11
- Peak intensity: 95 km/h (60 mph) (1-min); 984 hPa (mbar)

Elaine developed from an ill-defined easterly wave that passed south of Guam. Lack of sufficient data prevented accurate detection of the easterly wave east from Guam. As Elaine passed Yap, a surge of the monsoon winds to the south of the Inter-tropical trough intensified the wave and a weak circulation developed. The tropical storm moved at 12 knots until it passed over the northern tip of Mindanao; from this point a gradual recurvature toward the northwest was taken. A southerly flow in the South China Sea aided the intensification. The storm tracked within 60 miles of Manila and dissipated rapidly as it entered the China coast west-southwest of Hong Kong.

=== Typhoon Faye ===
- Typhoon (JMA)
- Category 2 typhoon (SSHWS)
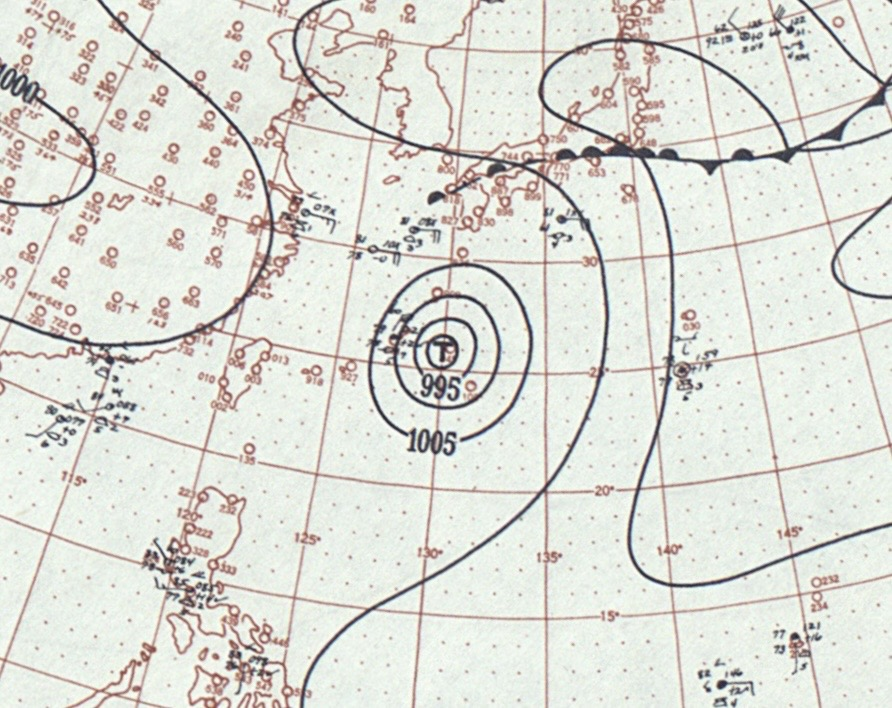
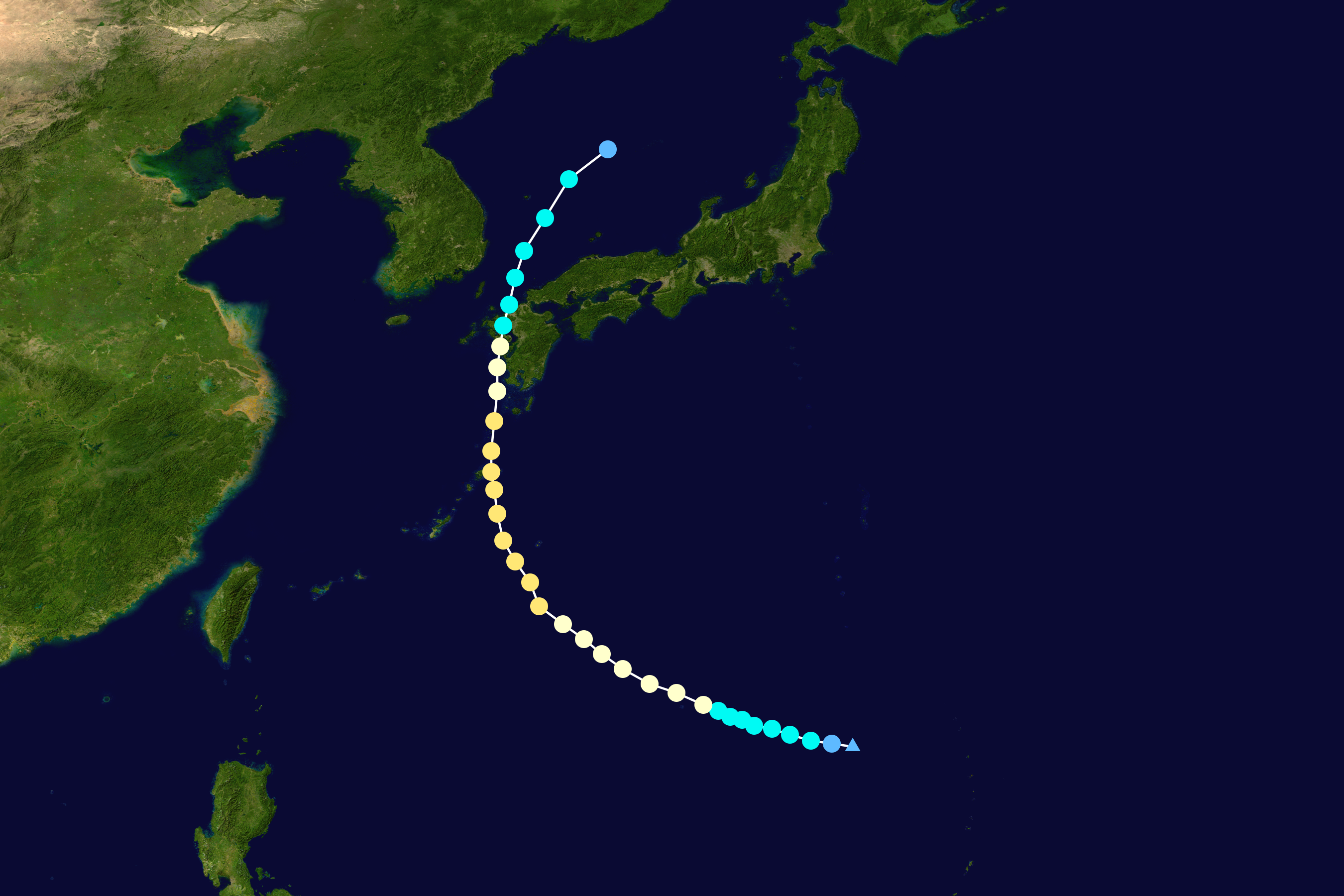
- Duration: July 11 – July 18
- Peak intensity: 165 km/h (105 mph) (1-min); 942 hPa (mbar)

Faye was one of two storms that had its origin in the upper air, between 25 and 40 thousand feet, and gradually descended to the surface over the western edge of the Pacific high cell (indications of Kwajalein's upper winds verified the presence of an upper air low, and five days later its nearness to Iwo Jima was reflected on the surface) Faye, a moderate storm moved near and to the south of Iwo Jima and recurved around the Pacific high cell, 500 miles to the west of Iwo Jima. Faye followed a northerly path and passed over the western edge of Kyushu into the Japanese Sea.

=== Typhoon Gloria ===
- Typhoon (JMA)
- Category 3 typhoon (SSHWS)
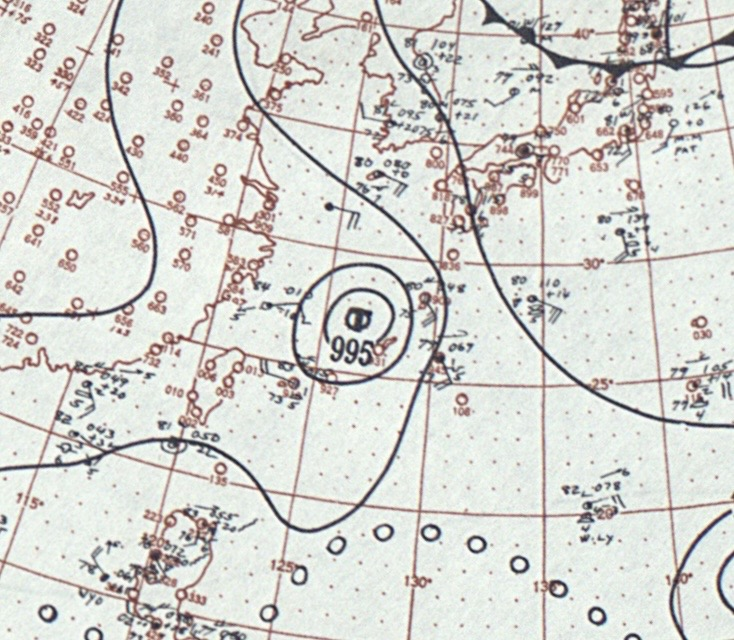
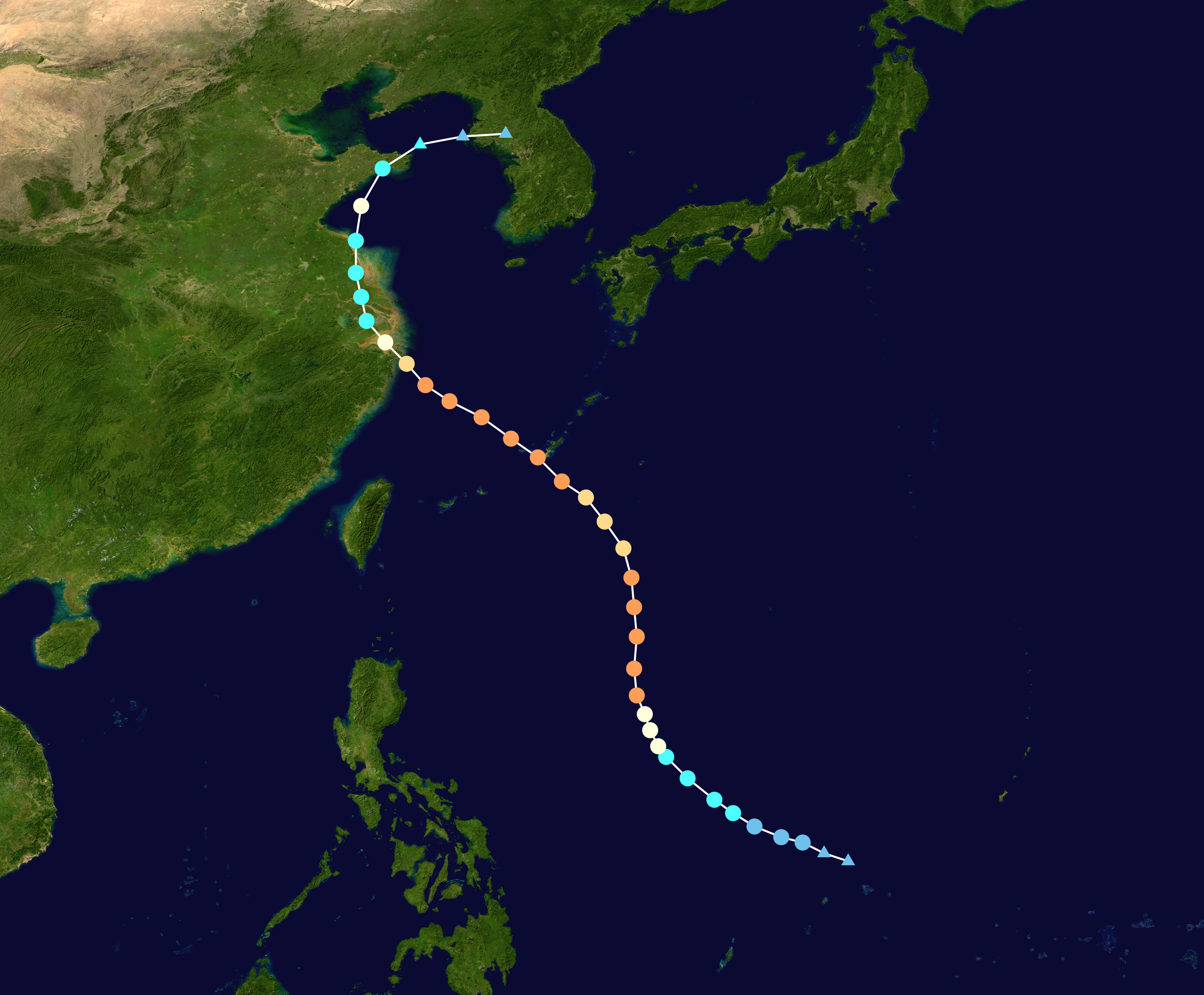
- Duration: July 18 – July 26
- Peak intensity: 205 km/h (125 mph) (1-min); 934 hPa (mbar)

Gloria, one of the most intense and destructive typhoons of the 1949 season, formed from a vortex associated with an easterly wave which was intensified by a southwesterly monsoon surge after passing south or Guam. Gloria was first detected as a typhoon near 15 N. and 132 E. Her future track was north for 450 miles with curvature to the northwest passing over Okinawa and entering the China coast near Shanghai. Maximum winds were estimated in excess of 110 knots. Gloria was the strongest typhoon to make landfall in the Shanghai area until Typhoon Bebinca 75 years later.

=== Typhoon Hester ===
- Typhoon (JMA)
- Category 3 typhoon (SSHWS)
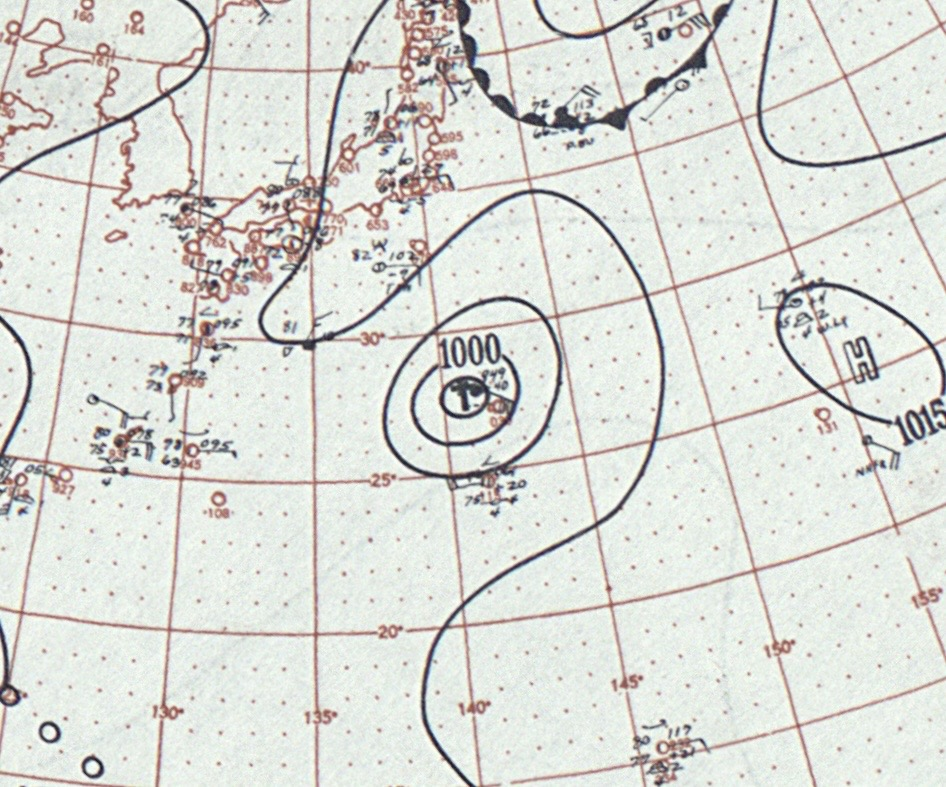
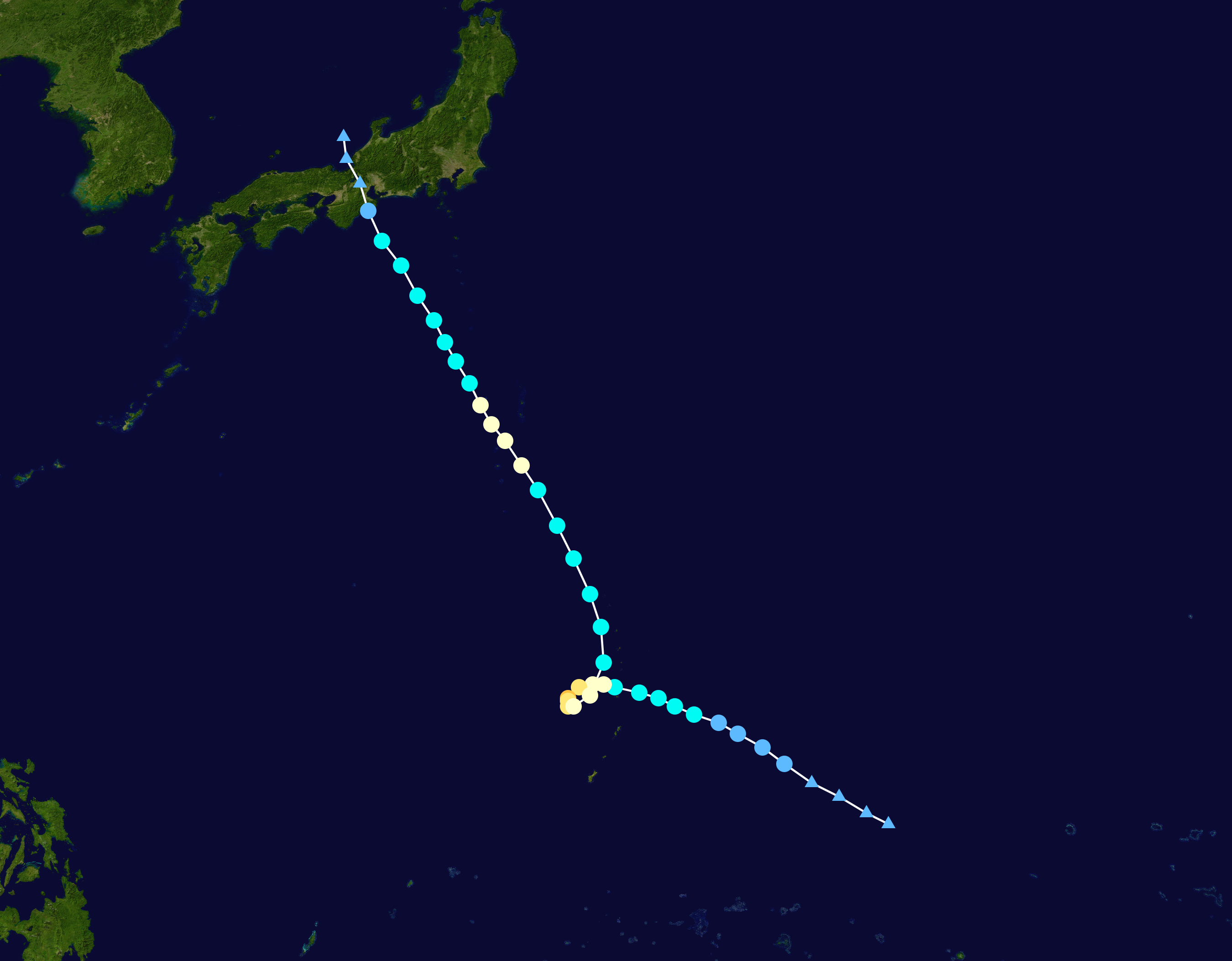
- Duration: July 19 – July 29
- Peak intensity: 205 km/h (125 mph) (1-min); 966 hPa (mbar)

Hester was one of the season's most confusing storms, resulted from the intensification of an easterly wave near Guam. Post analysis indicates that a convergent westerly and southwesterly flow in the vicinity of Saipan was the factor in intensification. Reconnaissance revealed a loop in Hester's track near Saipan. After a north-northwesterly movement to the east of Iwo Jima, the storm finally entered the Japanese mainland to the south of Tokyo. Hester was strongest at the time she was first detected and weakened thereafter, becoming negligible when it struck the Japanese islands.

=== Tropical Storm Irma ===
- Tropical storm (JMA)
- Tropical storm (SSHWS)
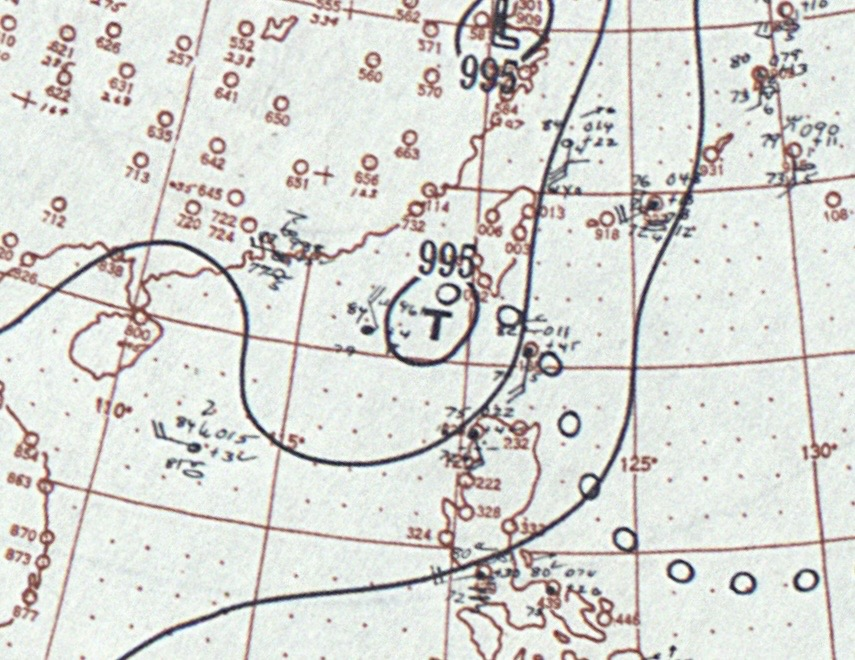
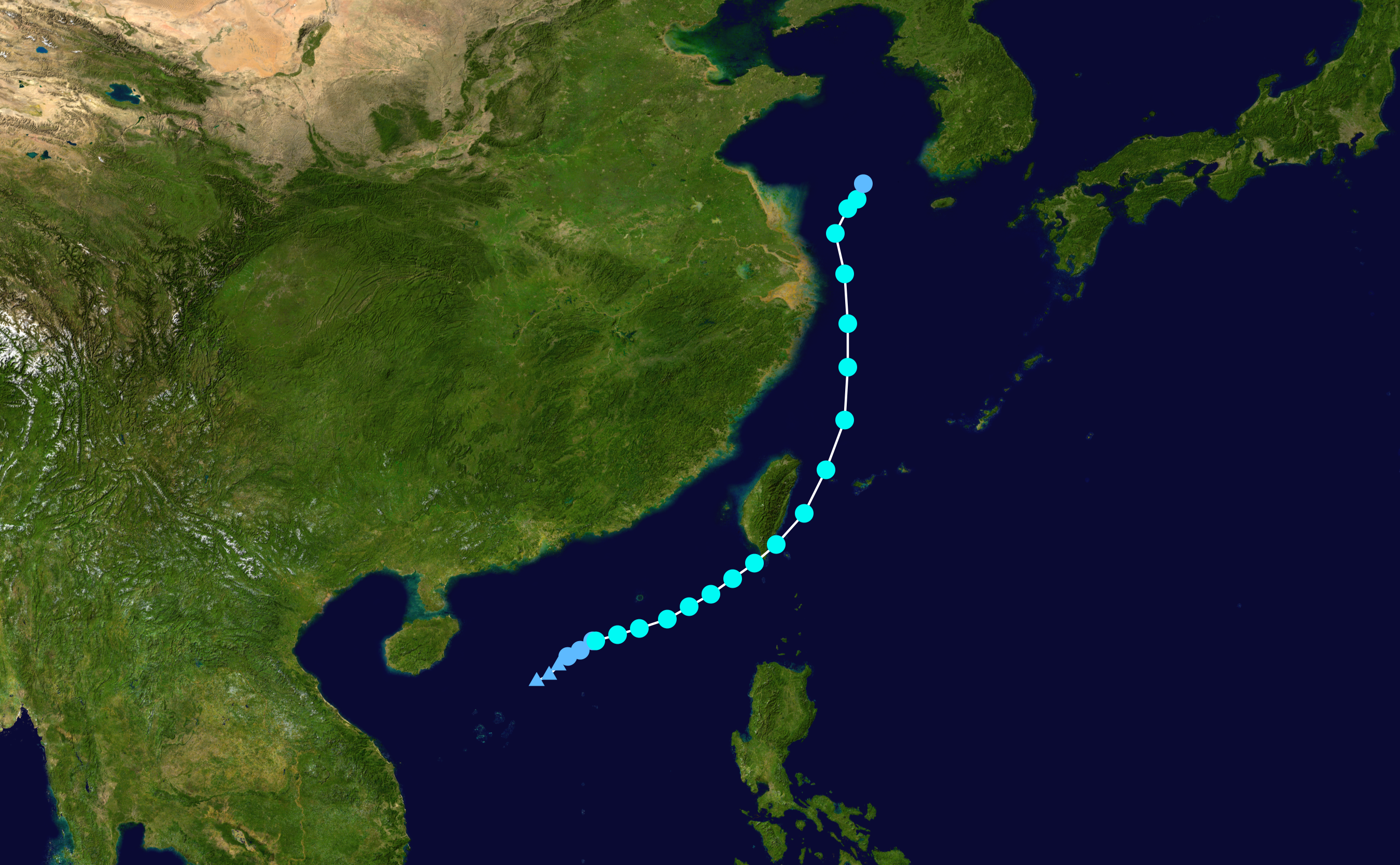
- Duration: July 25 – July 30
- Peak intensity: 95 km/h (60 mph) (1-min); 985 hPa (mbar)

Irma originated in the South China Sea and intensified into a weak storm for reasons that are only supposition due to a lack of data in that area. Her path was northeast and finally north. Throughout her life, reconnaissance could find no evidence of a defined center, but reported 50 knot winds.

=== Typhoon Judith ===
- Typhoon (JMA)
- Category 2 typhoon (SSHWS)
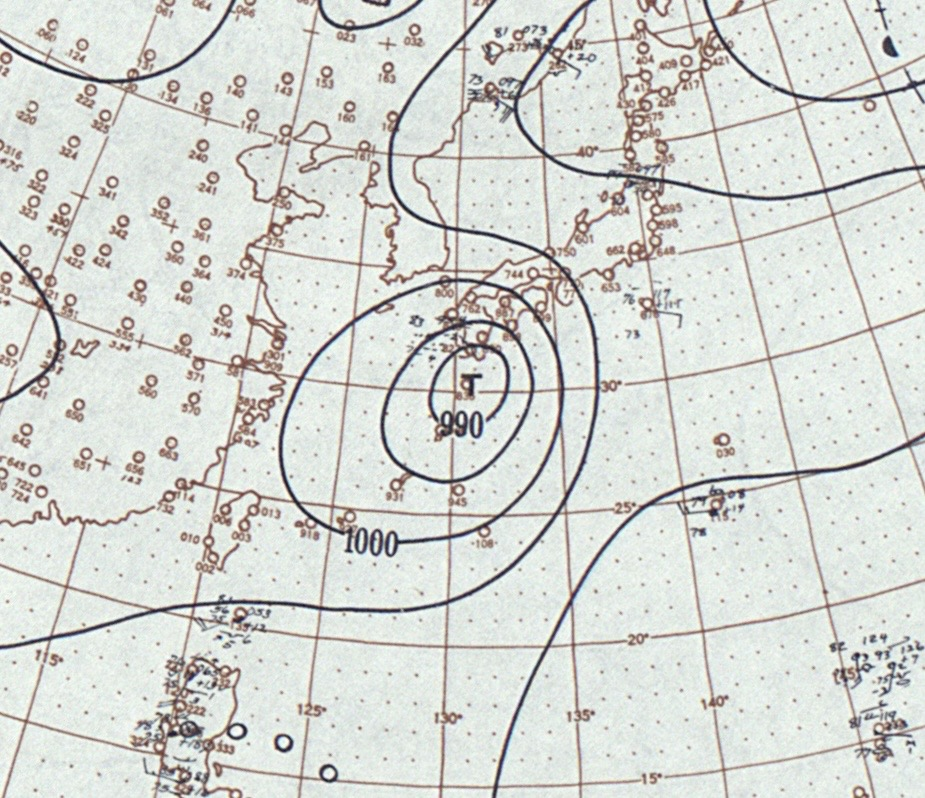
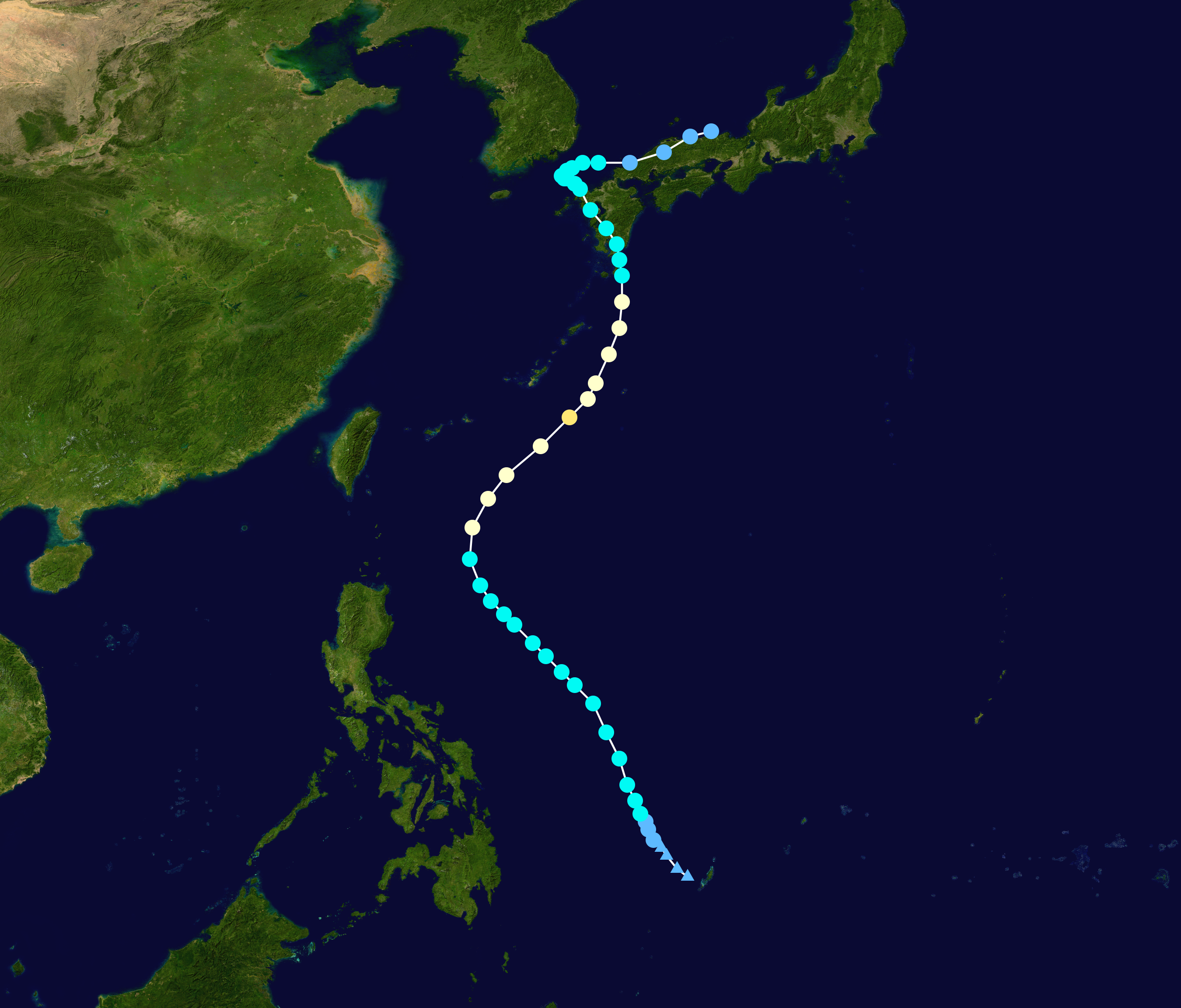
- Duration: August 8 – August 19
- Peak intensity: 155 km/h (100 mph) (1-min); 964 hPa (mbar)

Judith, began as a vortex associated with an easterly wave and can be identified as having passed Kwajalein 20 days prior to its dissipation. Intensification into a typhoon occurred near 14 N and 126 E but the reason is uncertain. Soon after detection of the typhoon, normal recurvature began, but two days later an inverse recurvature was evident. At the time it was thought that Judith split into two cells one moving east-northeast and the other north-northwest. Post analysis indicates that only one cell was present and its path was slightly to the east of Okinawa with inverse recurvature over western Kyushu

=== Typhoon Kitty ===
- Typhoon (JMA)
- Category 3 typhoon (SSHWS)
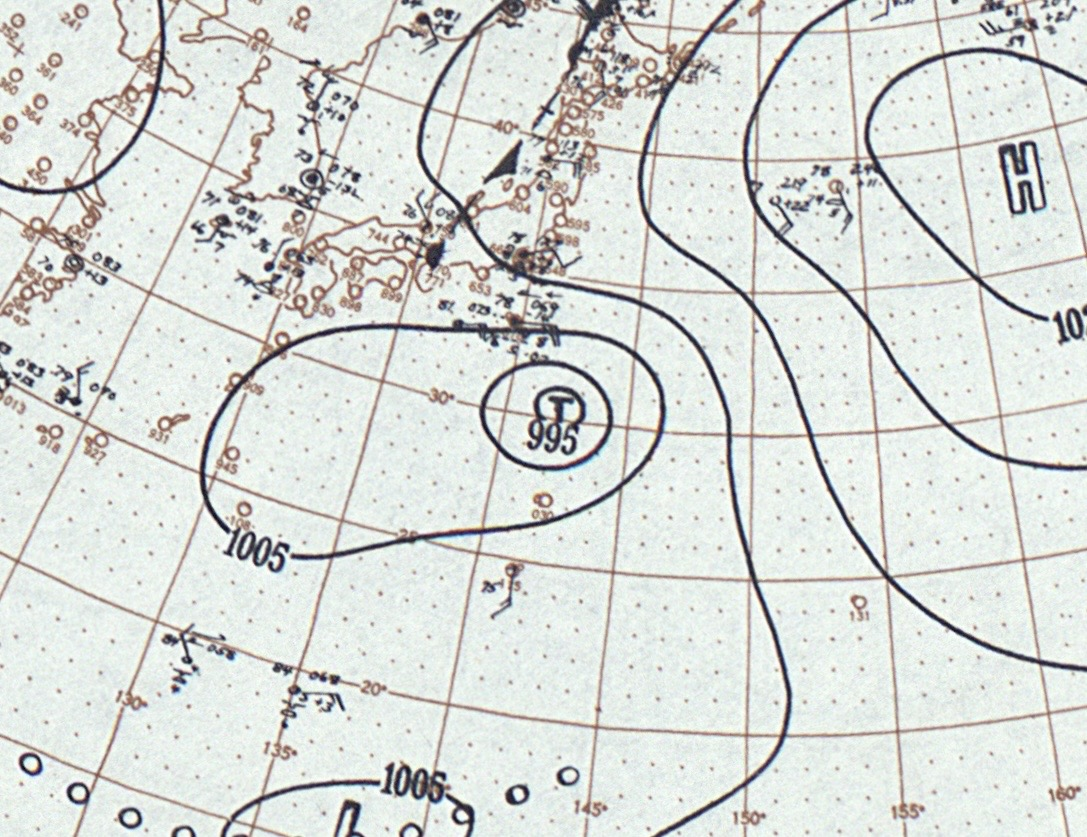
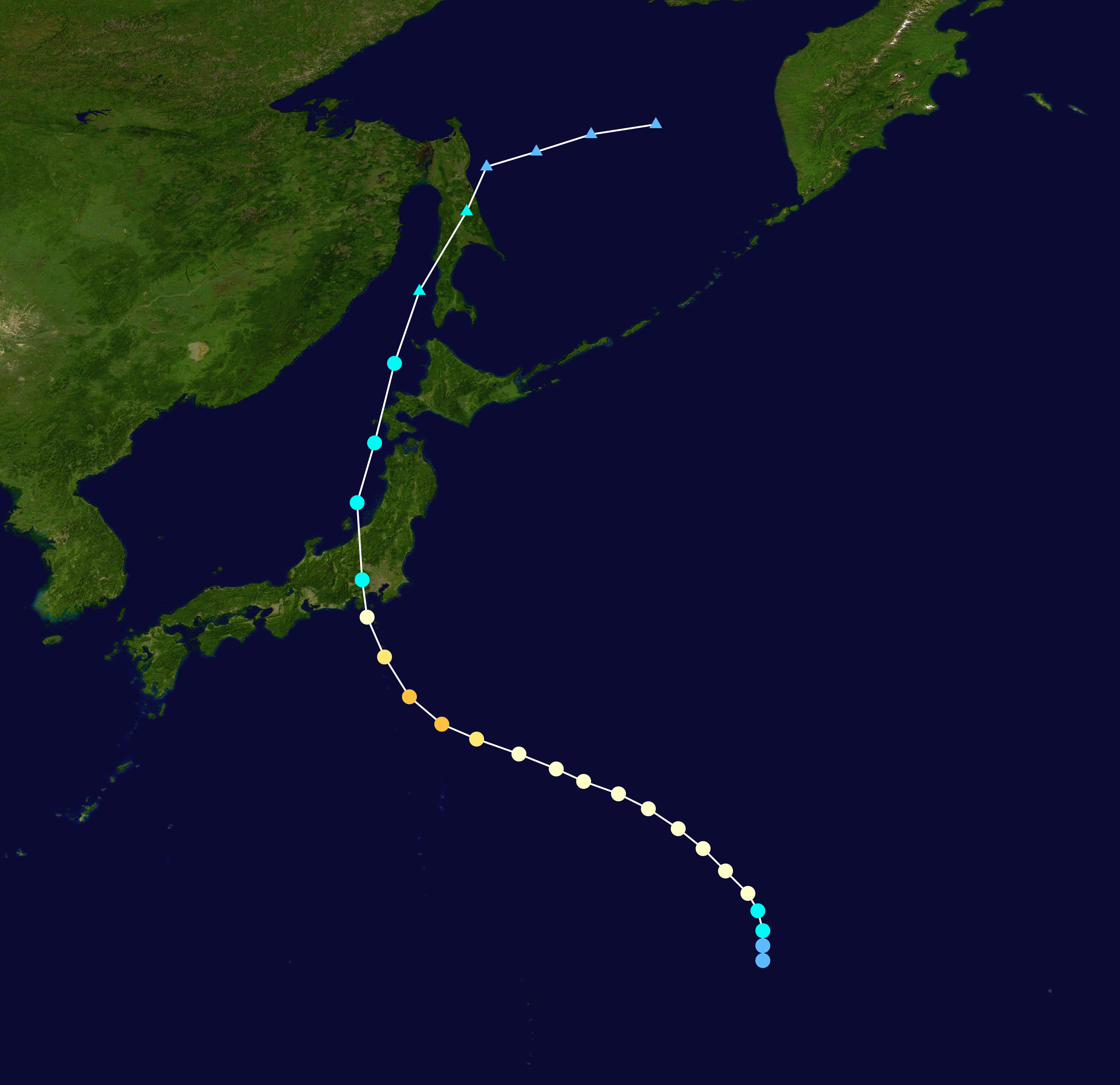
- Duration: August 28 – September 1
- Peak intensity: 205 km/h (125 mph) (1-min); 952 hPa (mbar)

Kitty originated from an easterly wave that passed Kwajalein and intensified near 23 N and 154 E. It is believed that intensification was the result of a westerly trough that moved to the north of the storm prior to its detection. Further, the northwest movement into the nose of the Pacific high cell carried out in maintaining the gradient. Kitty began recurvature near 32 N and 140 E, but was never completed as the storm maintained a northerly movement across Honshu and dissipated near Hokkaido; reconnaissance reported a maximum wind of 65 knots. Kitty cut a wide swathe of destruction in the Tokyo area than any storm during the 1949 season; gusts of up to 75 knots were reported along with torrential rains. Kitty is responsible for 135 deaths and 25 persons missing; it was one of the most destructive typhoons to hit Tokyo at that time.

=== Typhoon Lise ===
- Typhoon (JMA)
- Category 4 typhoon (SSHWS)
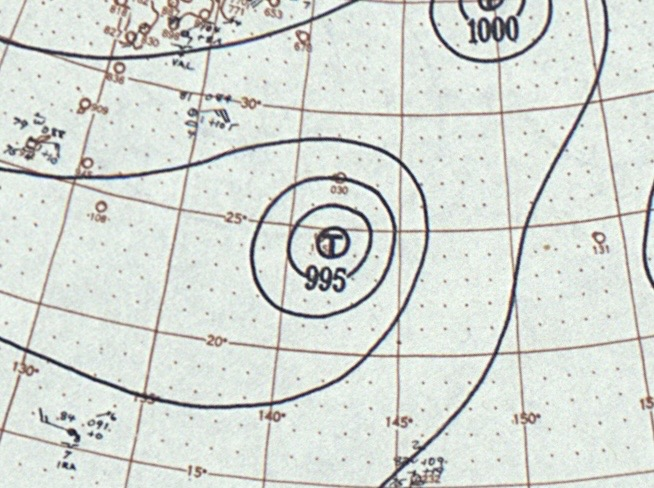
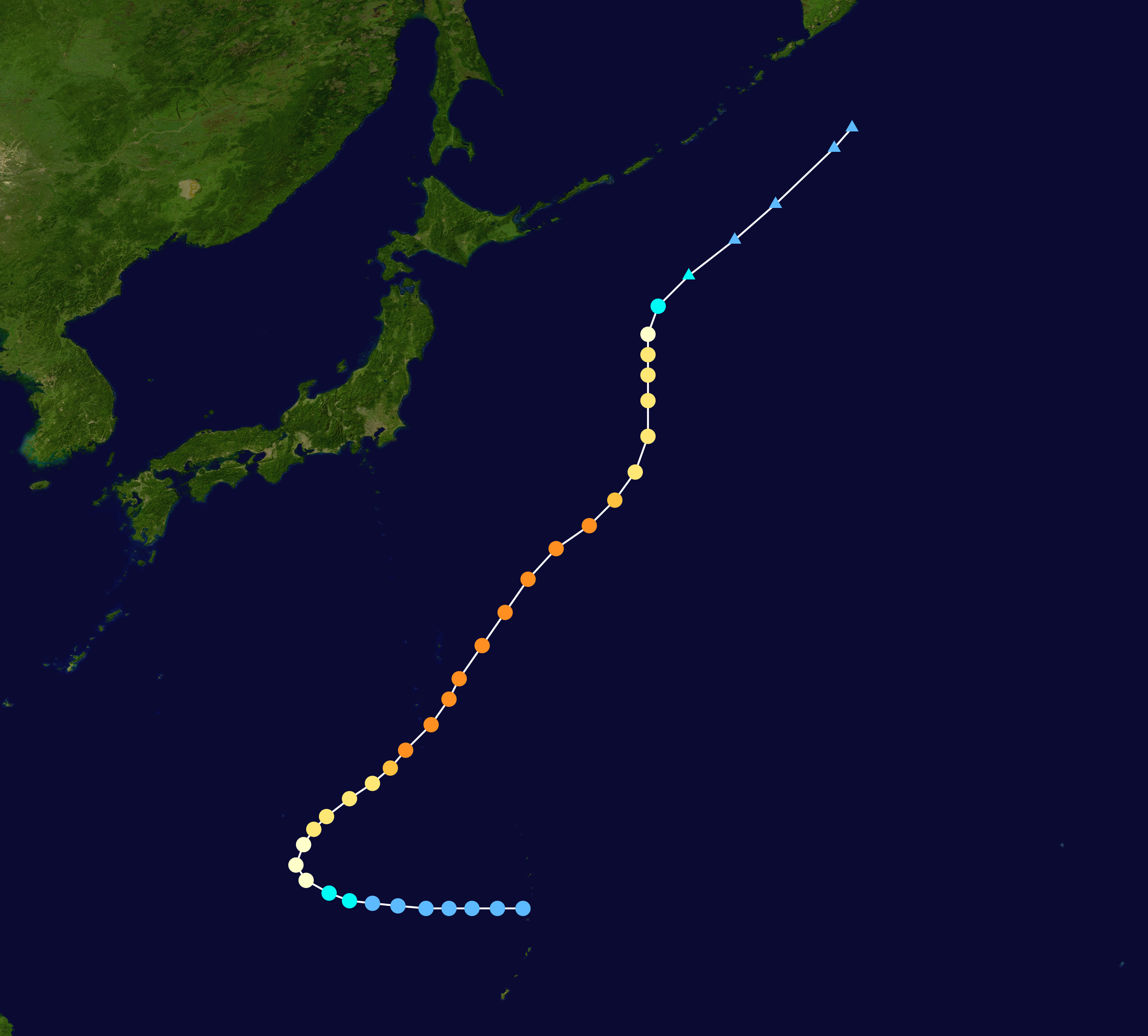
- Duration: August 31 – September 8
- Peak intensity: 220 km/h (140 mph) (1-min); 938 hPa (mbar)

Tropical Cyclone Lise was first detected as a weak tropical low passing north of Guam and Saipan on 31 August, Navy Reconnaissance two days later established that this low had increased to typhoon intensity. Intensification is attributed to the low moving into a stagnant low pressure area in tho Philippine Sea. Lise began a sharp recurvature on 2 September and passed 70 miles southeast of Iwo Jima as an intense typhoon on 4 September. Maximum winds of 85 knots were experienced at Iwo Jima for a short period.

=== Typhoon Madeline ===
- Tropical storm (JMA)
- Category 1 typhoon (SSHWS)
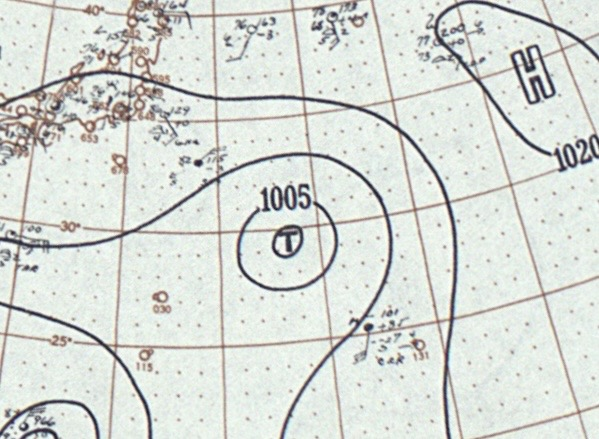
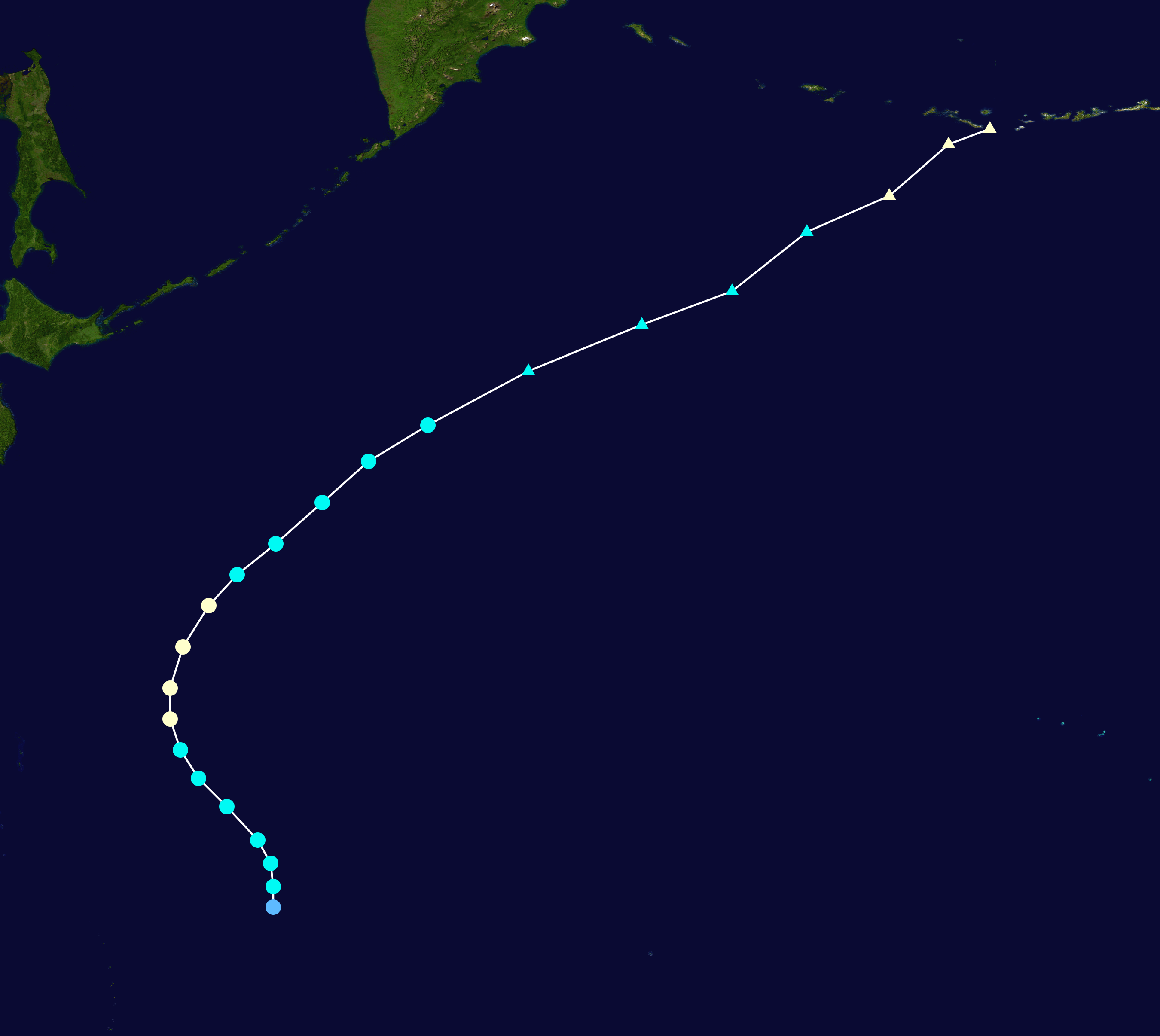
- Duration: September 2 – September 6
- Peak intensity: 140 km/h (85 mph) (1-min); 972 hPa (mbar)

Madeline was the second of two storms during the season that originated in the upper air and surfaced over the western edge of the Pacific high cel. A surface ship on 2 September first gave indications of a relatively weak storm in the vicinity of 21 N and 151 E. The storm was discovered while in the process of recurvature; the track thereafter moving northward while missing Iwo Jima by 450 miles. Madeline dissipated into polar trough five days after it was detected.

=== Tropical Storm 12W ===
- Tropical storm (SSHWS)
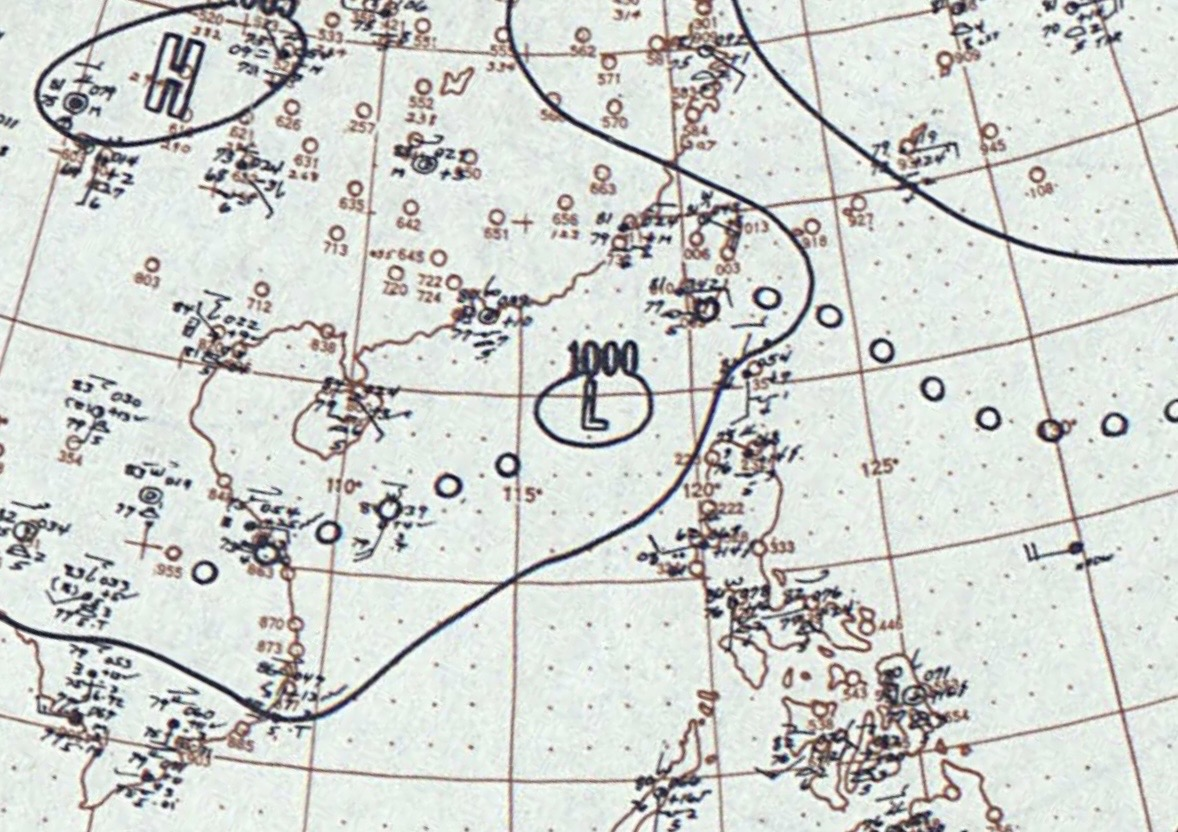
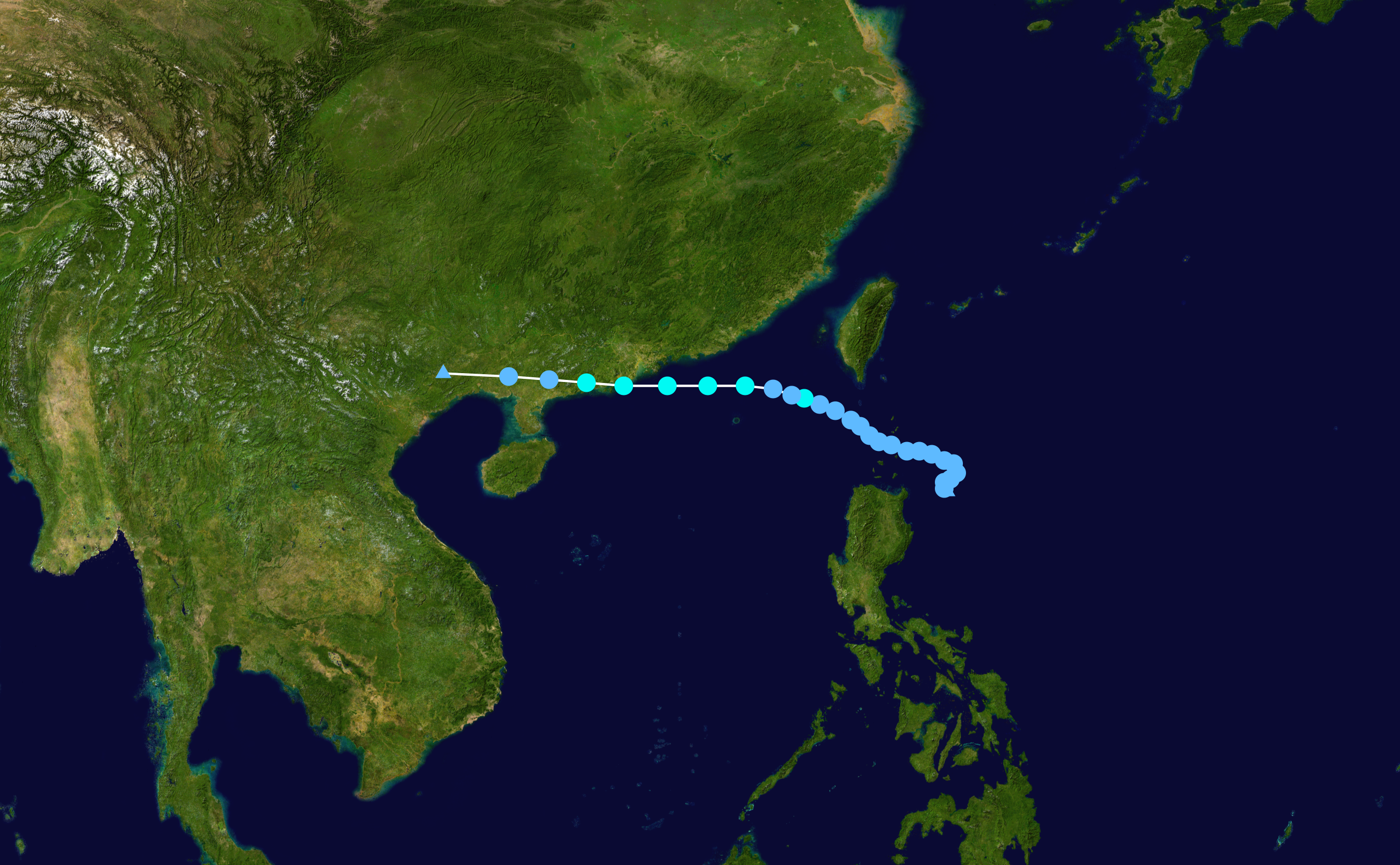
- Duration: September 2 – September 8
- Peak intensity: 65 km/h (40 mph) (1-min); 995 hPa (mbar)

Tropical Storm 12W was first classified as a tropical depression northeast of Luzon. 12W intensified into a tropical storm and made landfall in Southern China on September 8 and dissipated during the next day.

=== Typhoon Nelly ===
- Typhoon (JMA)
- Category 2 typhoon (SSHWS)
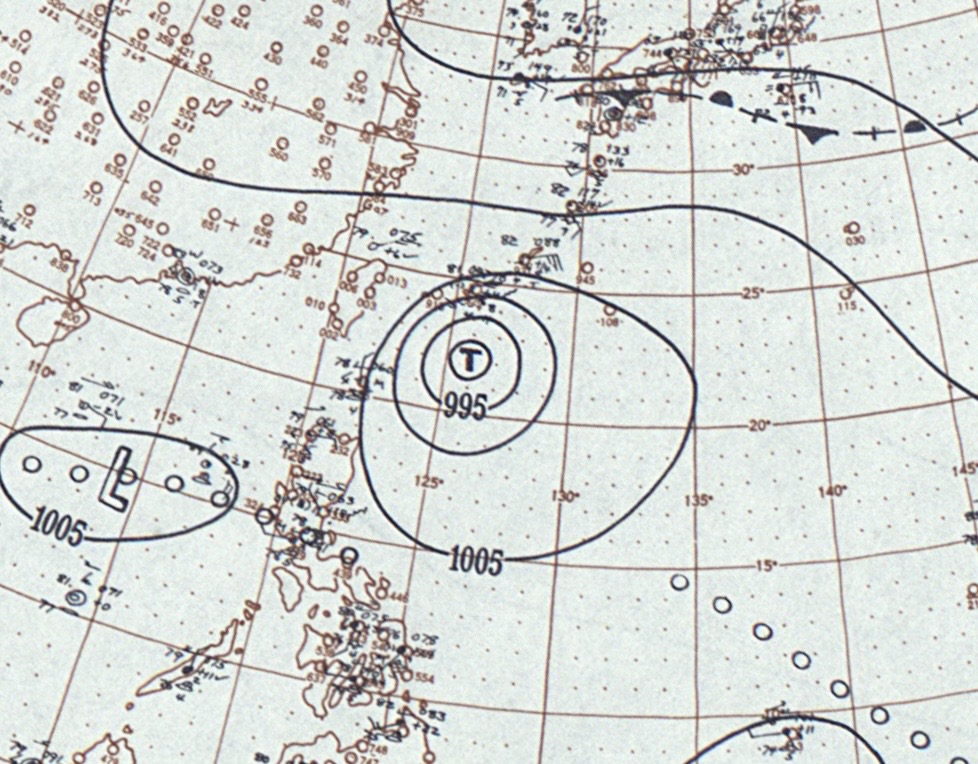
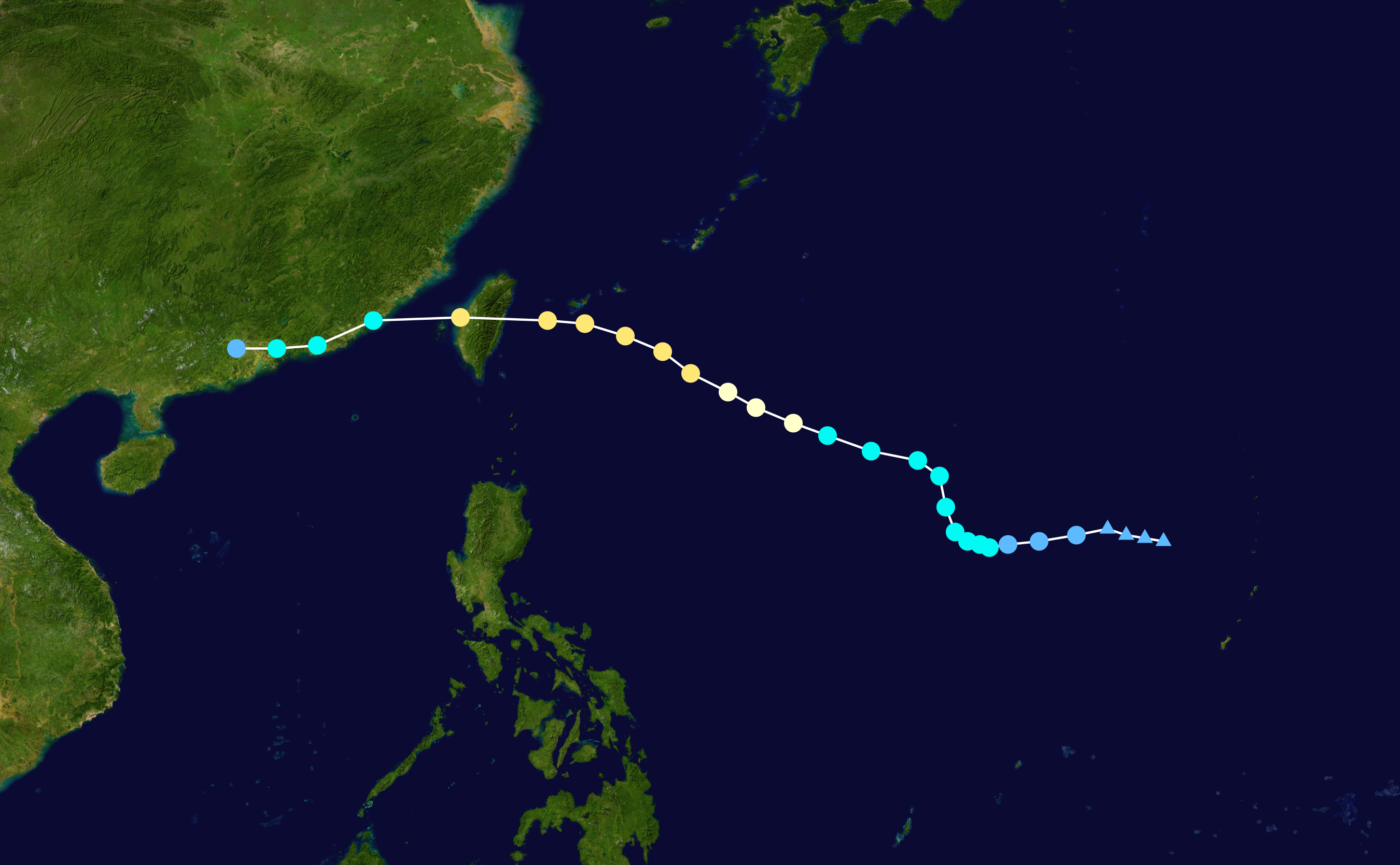
- Duration: September 9 – September 15
- Peak intensity: 175 km/h (110 mph) (1-min); 939 hPa (mbar)

Nelly was the result of an easterly wave that intensified into a typhoon eight days after its passage at Truk. The factor in intensification was a weak but persistent westerly trough that extended south-southwest to a point just northeast of the storm. Reconnaissance established Nelly as a typhoon 250 miles south of Okinawa, after three previous missions over a period of five days had failed to find winds in excess of 45 knots. The storm passed south of Okinawa and struck central Taiwan. Nelly disappeared into the China coast north of Hong Kong.

=== Tropical Storm 14W ===
- Tropical storm (SSHWS)
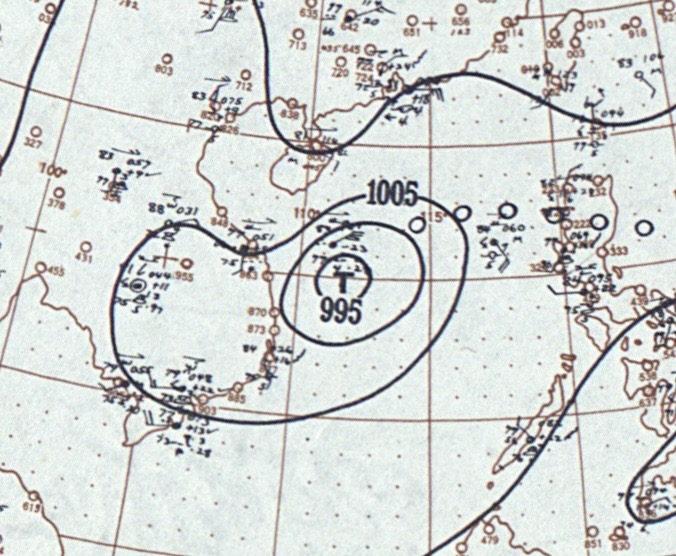
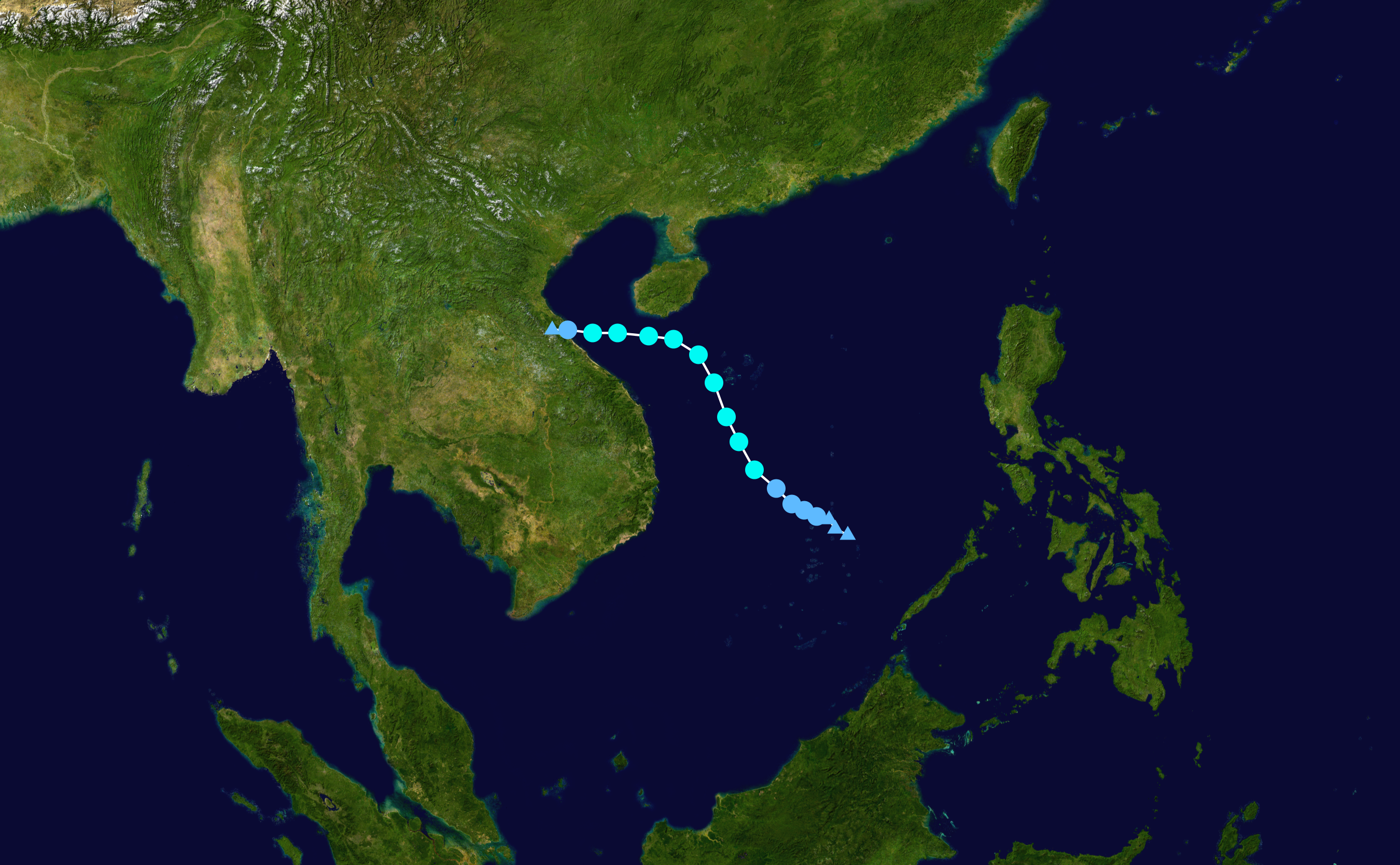
- Duration: September 18 – September 21
- Peak intensity: 75 km/h (45 mph) (1-min); 995 hPa (mbar)

Tropical Storm 14W was first classified as a tropical depression on September 18. 14W intensified into a tropical storm and made landfall in Vietnam where it dissipated during September 22.

=== Tropical Storm 15W ===
- Tropical storm (SSHWS)
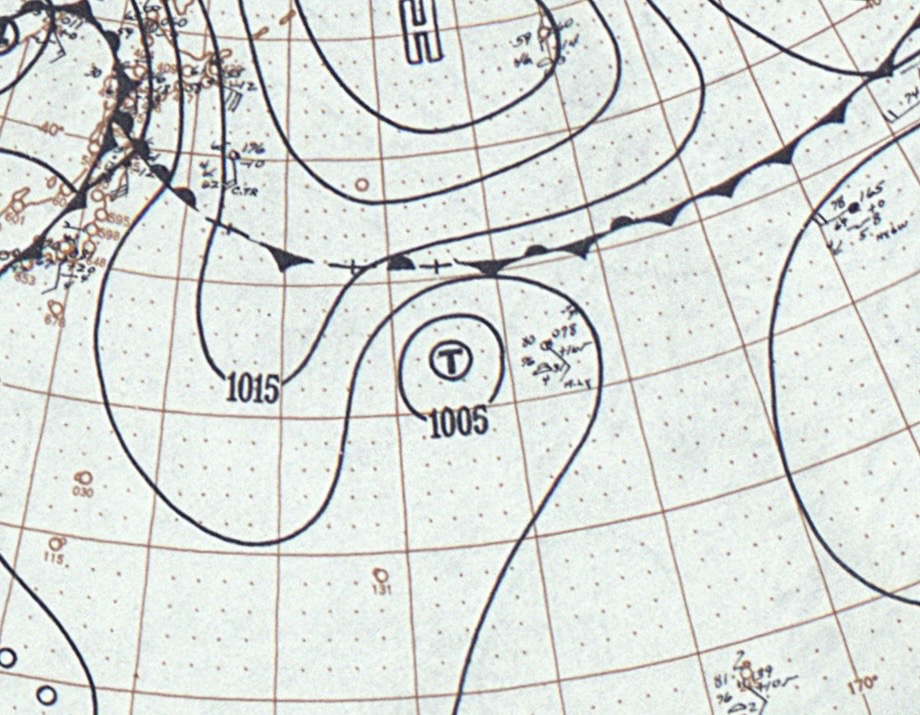
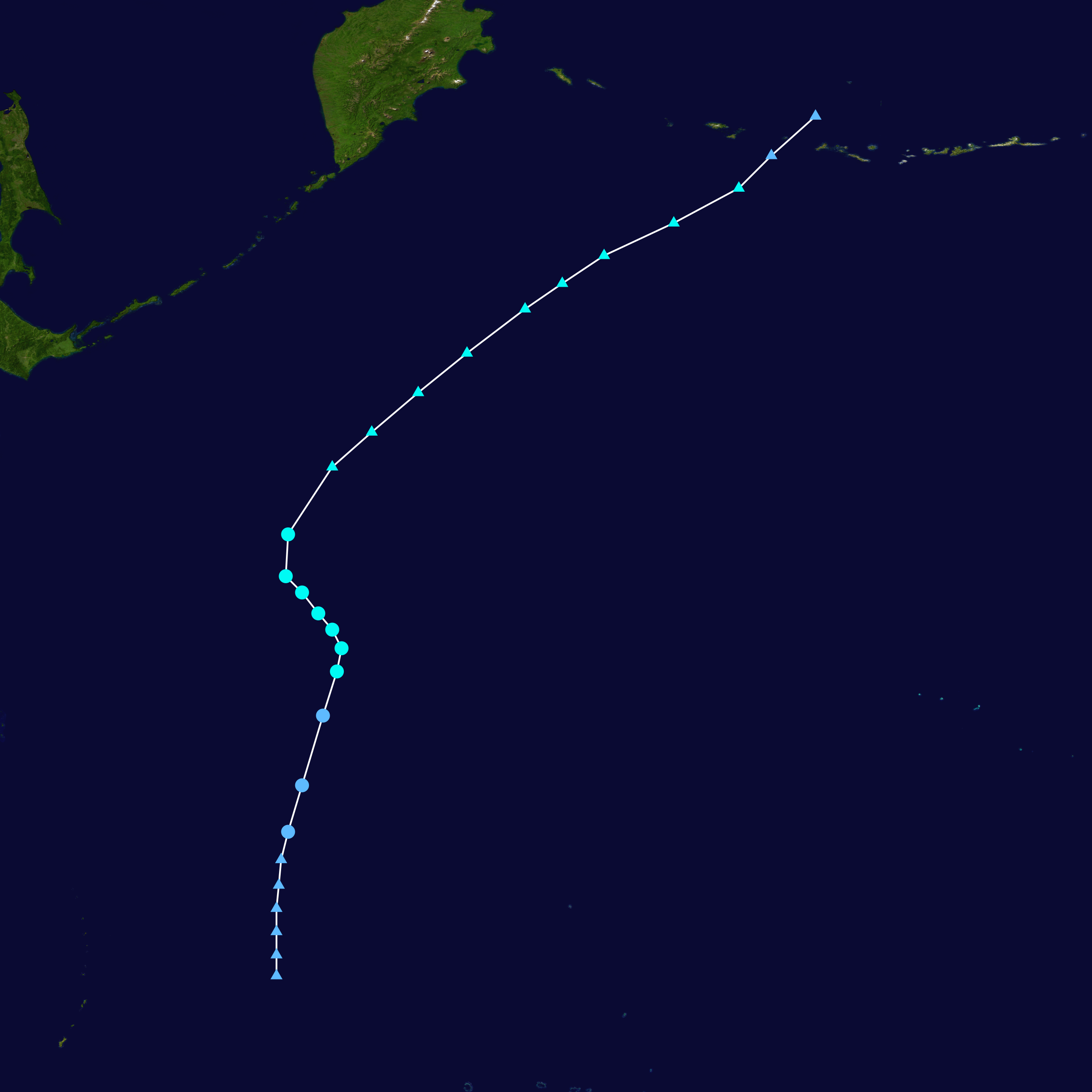
- Duration: September 22 – September 25
- Peak intensity: 75 km/h (45 mph) (1-min); 993 hPa (mbar)

Tropical Storm 15W developed northeast of the Mariana Islands on September 22. Moving northwards as a tropical storm, 15W became extratropical on September 25.

=== Typhoon Omelia ===
- Typhoon (JMA)
- Category 1 typhoon (SSHWS)
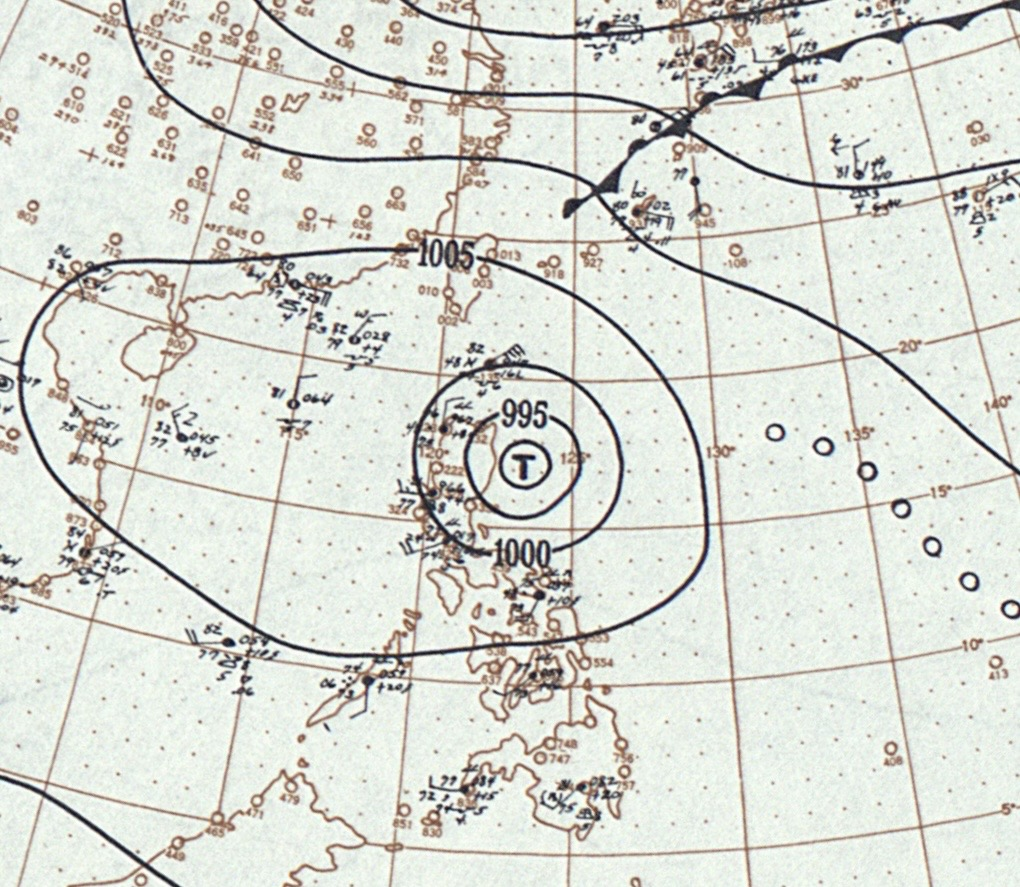
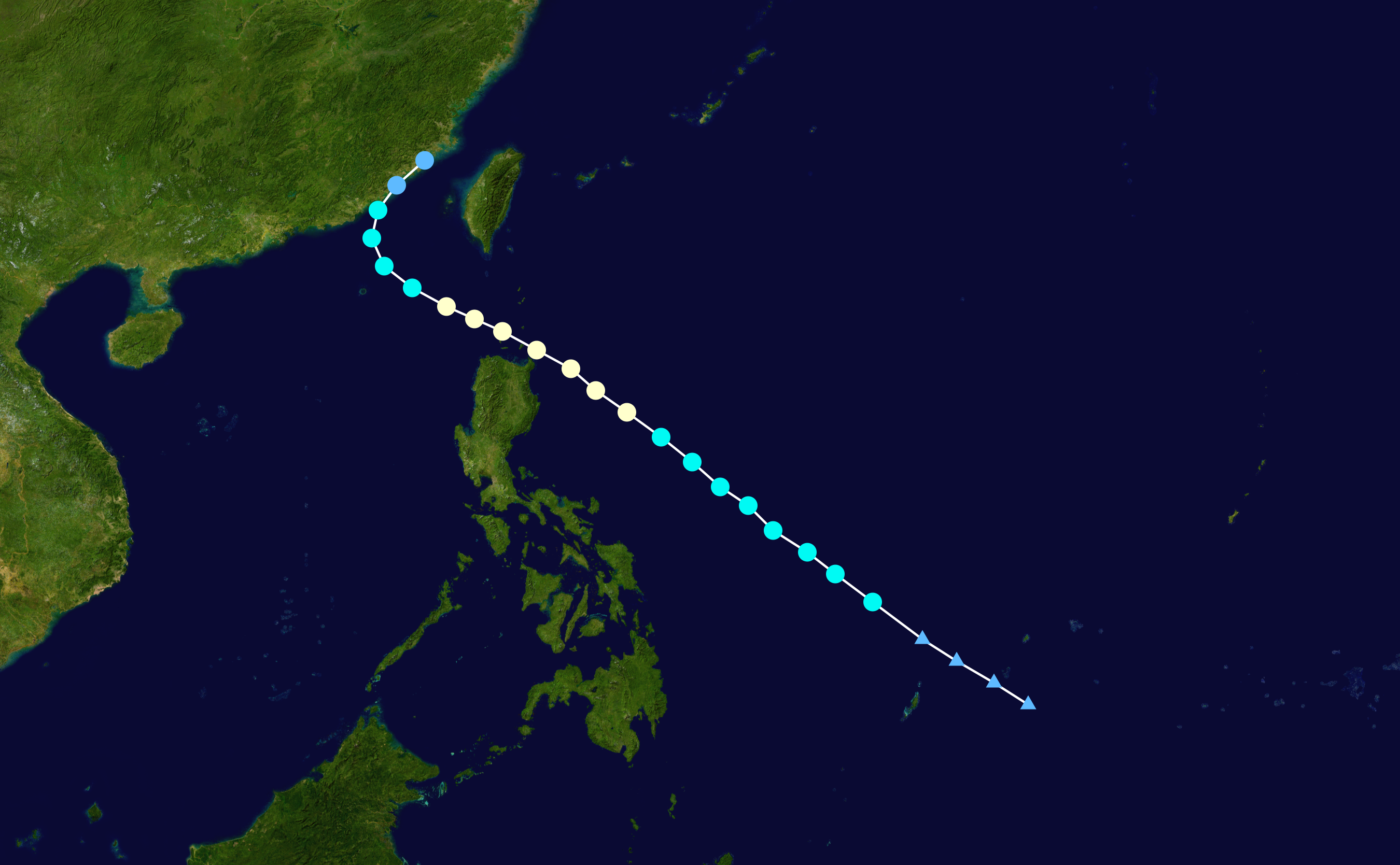
- Duration: September 30 – October 4
- Peak intensity: 140 km/h (85 mph) (1-min); 972 hPa (mbar)

Omelia was first noticed in the latter days September in the Yap-Palau area. This storm can be traced to Kwajalein, nine days prior to its intensification to a tropical storm. Data is insufficient to determine the cause of intensification, and reconnaissance fixes failed to reveal its intensity. Moving northwest-ward, Omelia passed between Luzon and Taiwan striking the China coast on 4 October 180 miles northeast of Hong Kong. Omelia's distinguishing feature was the reported fact that no closed circulation could be found near the center by reconnaissance.

=== Typhoon Patricia ===
- Typhoon (JMA)
- Category 4 typhoon (SSHWS)
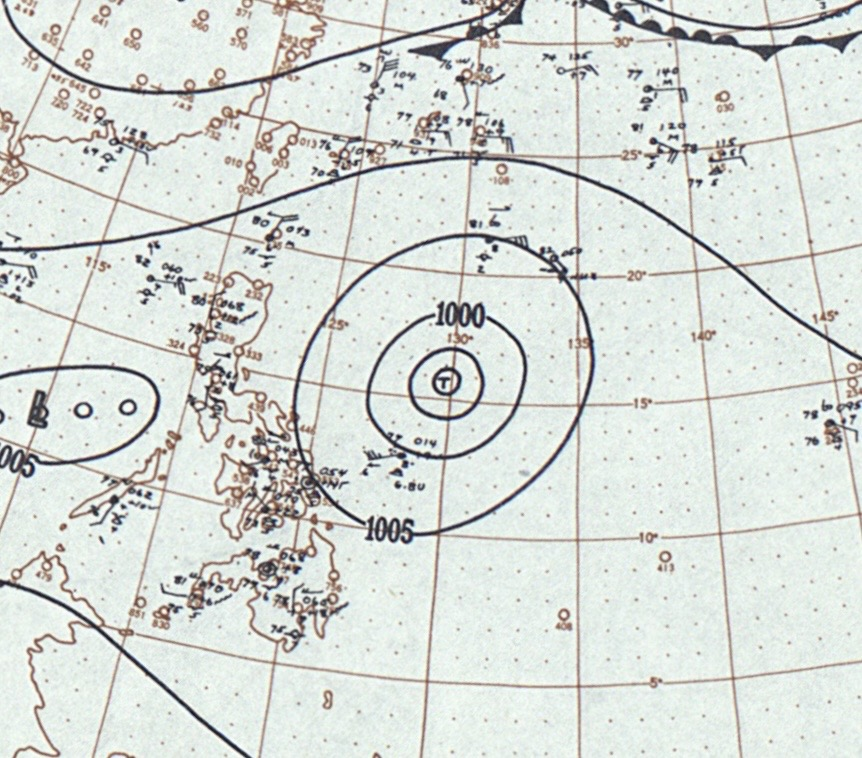
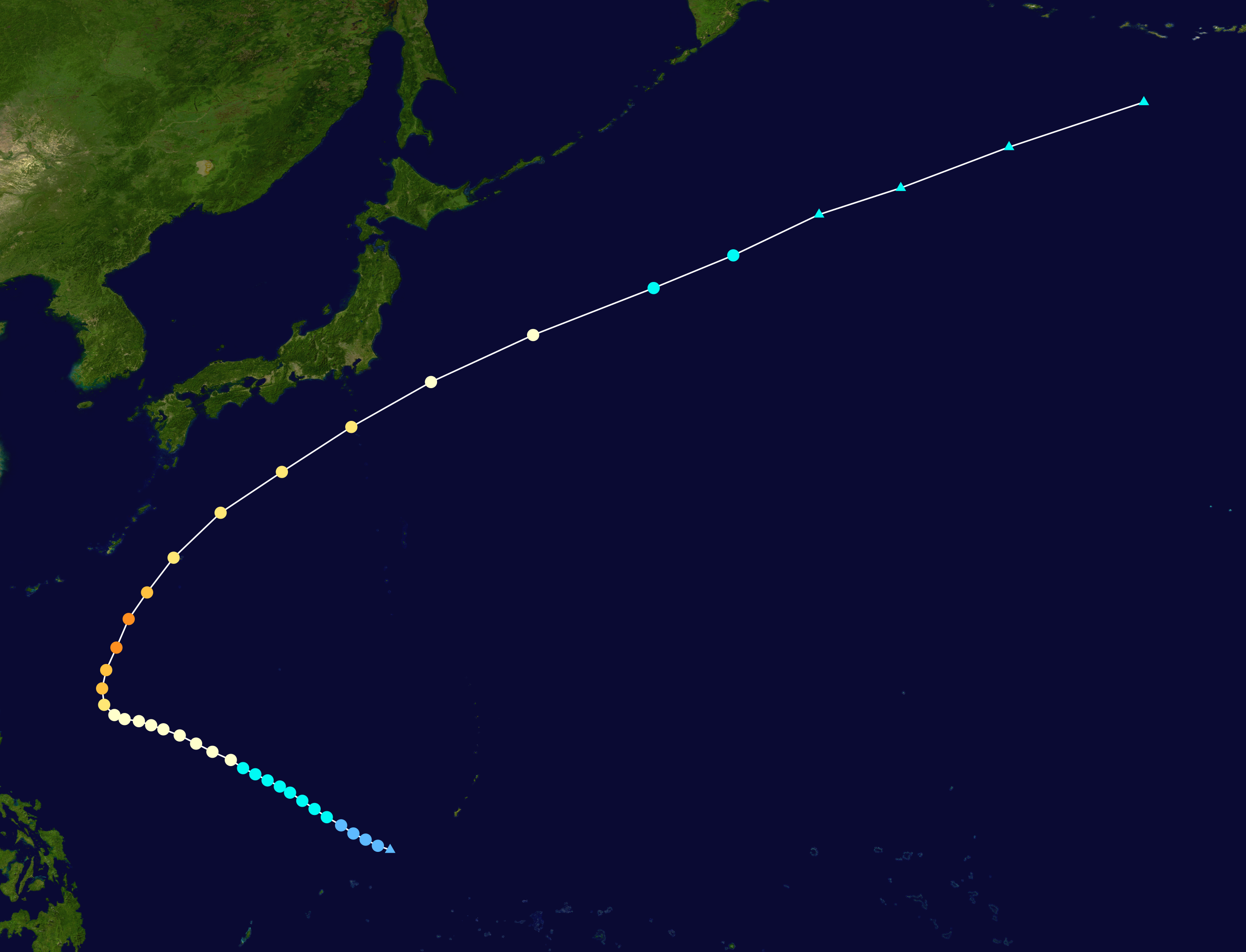
- Duration: October 20 – October 28
- Peak intensity: 220 km/h (140 mph) (1-min); 942 hPa (mbar)

On 17 October, surface ship reports from the Truk area gave the first indication of the tropical disturbance later named Patricia. As it moved slowly northwestward it began to intensify such that a definite closed circulation was apparent with the passage-southwest of Guam on 20 October. At this time, the storm was in the process, of recurvature and continued thereafter on a northeasterly track which skirted all U.S. Military installations. Patricia traversed over 3,000 miles in the eleven days it was under surveillance.

=== Tropical Storm 18W ===
- Tropical storm (SSHWS)
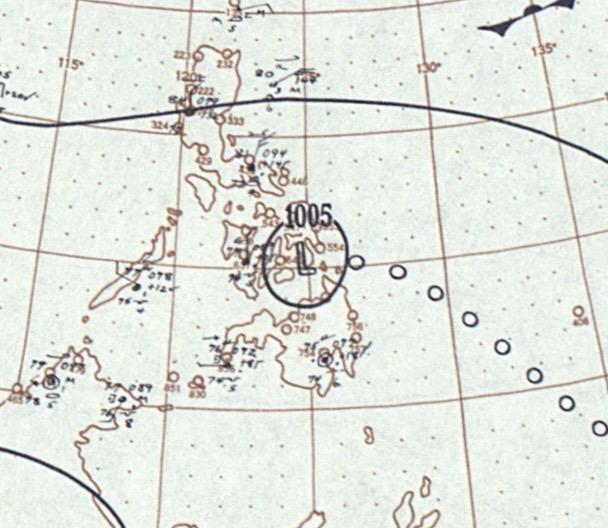
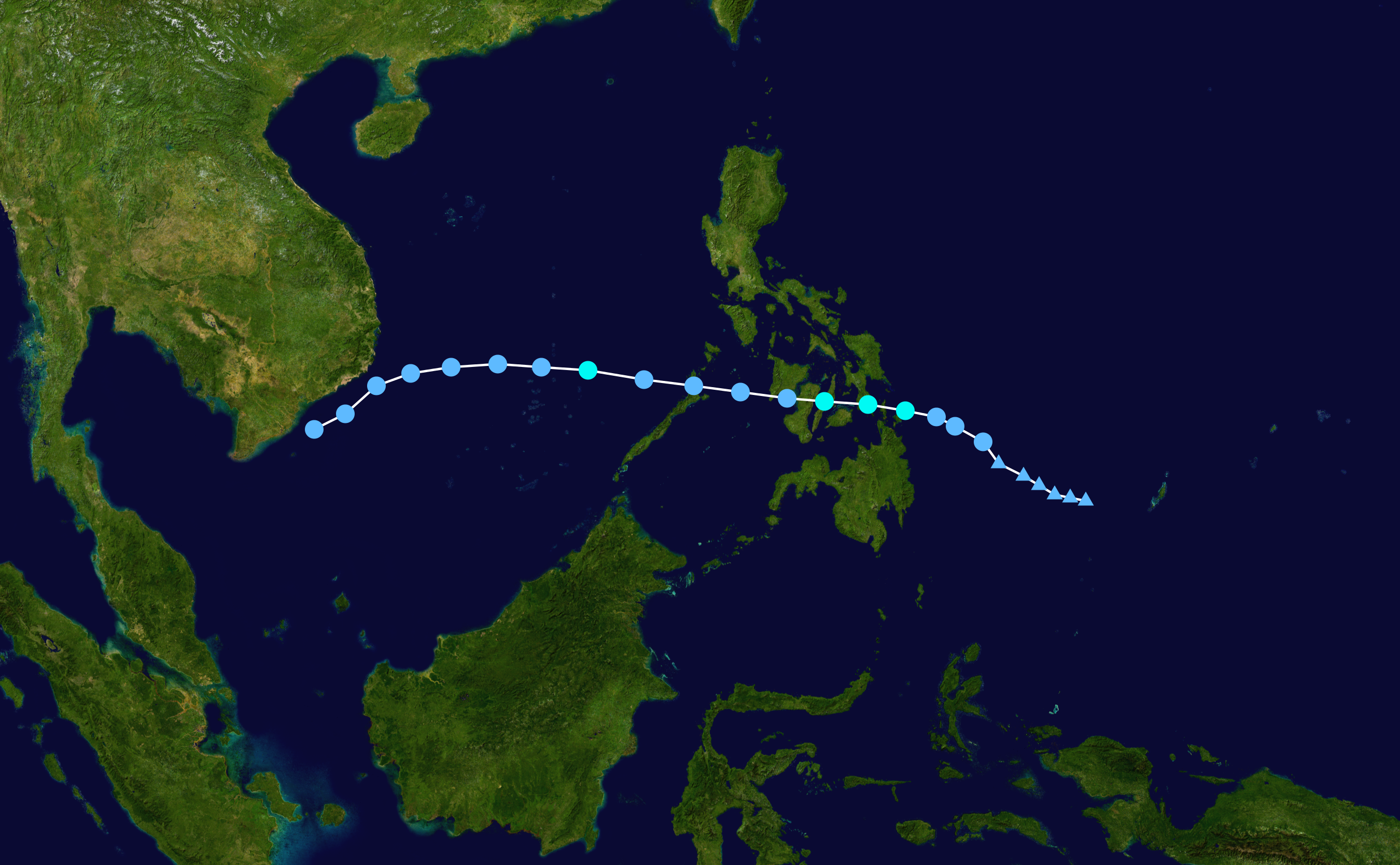
- Duration: November 1 – November 4
- Peak intensity: 75 km/h (45 mph) (1-min); 997 hPa (mbar)

Tropical Storm 18W affected Visayas, Philippines as a tropical storm during early November.

=== Tropical Storm Rena ===
- Typhoon (JMA)
- Tropical storm (SSHWS)
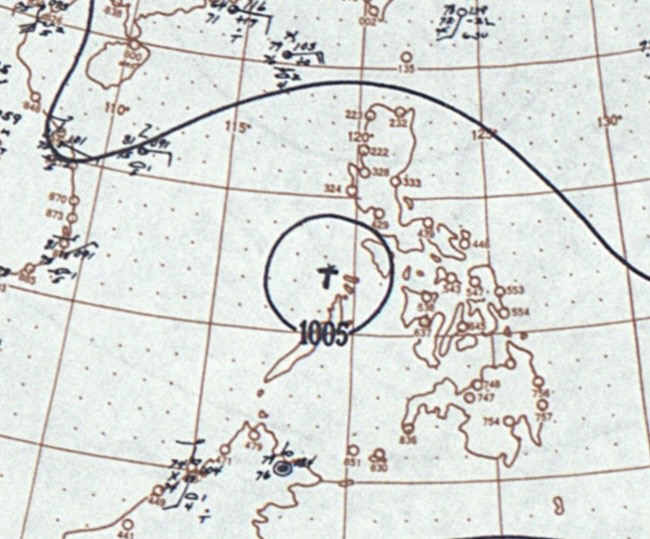
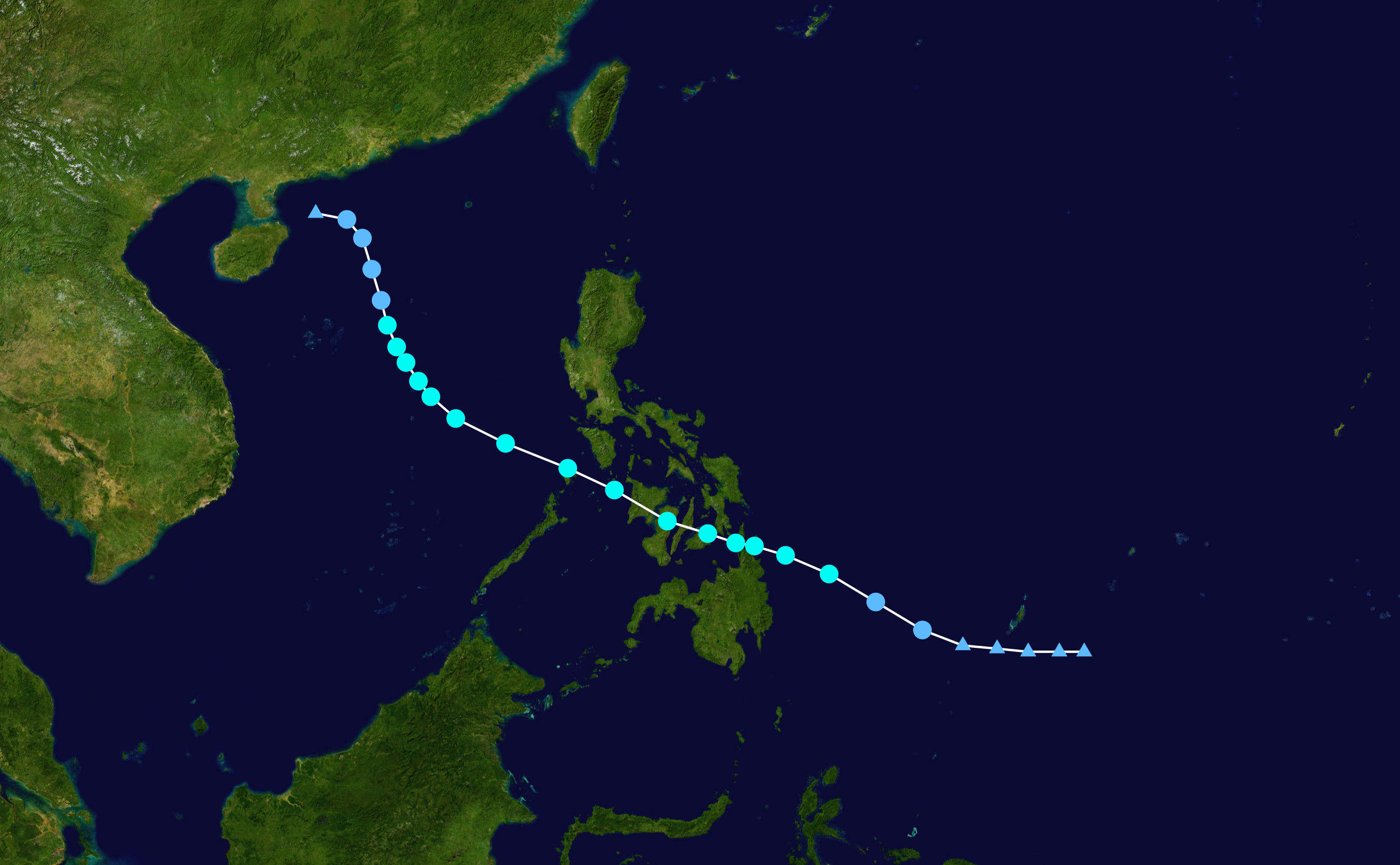
- Duration: November 9 – November 15
- Peak intensity: 110 km/h (70 mph) (1-min); 993 hPa (mbar)

Tropical Storm Rena was an example of the early winter storms which form and intensify in the Palau area, then move across the Southern Philippines to die in the south China Sea. Rena passed through the islands bringing heavy rains but not excessive winds. It is thought that damage was slight since the maximum winds reported by a land station was 45 knots. Rena took up a course for Hong Kong, but dissipation had already begun, and in crossing the China Sea the storm lost its identity.

=== Typhoon Allyn ===
- Typhoon (JMA)
- Category 4 typhoon (SSHWS)
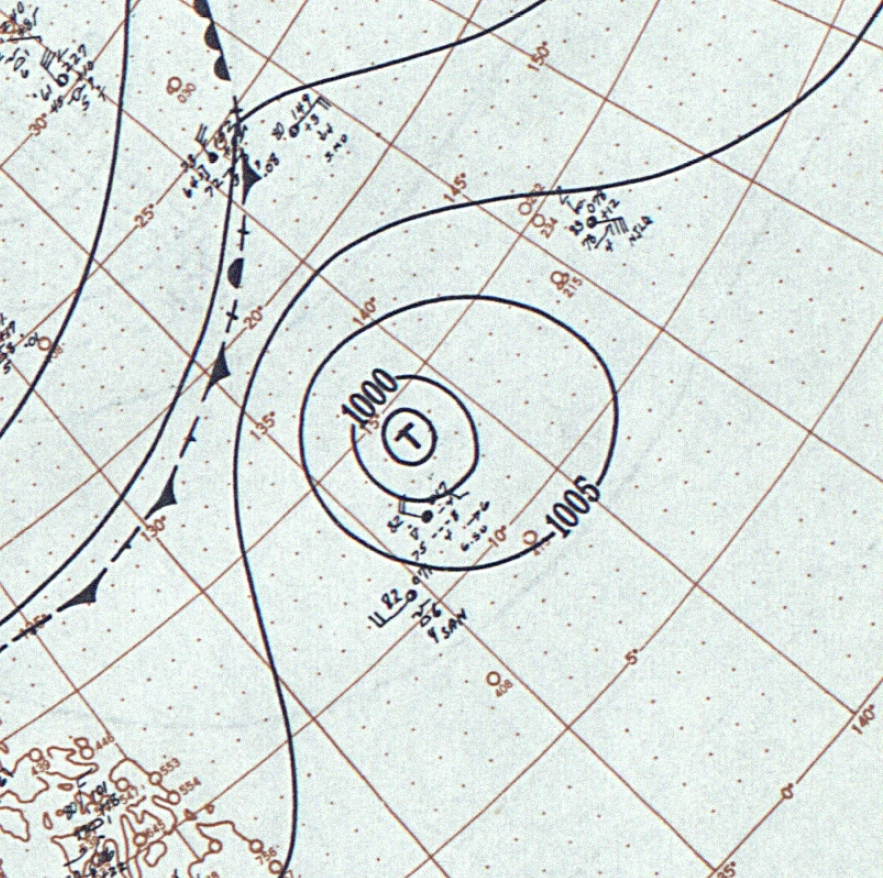
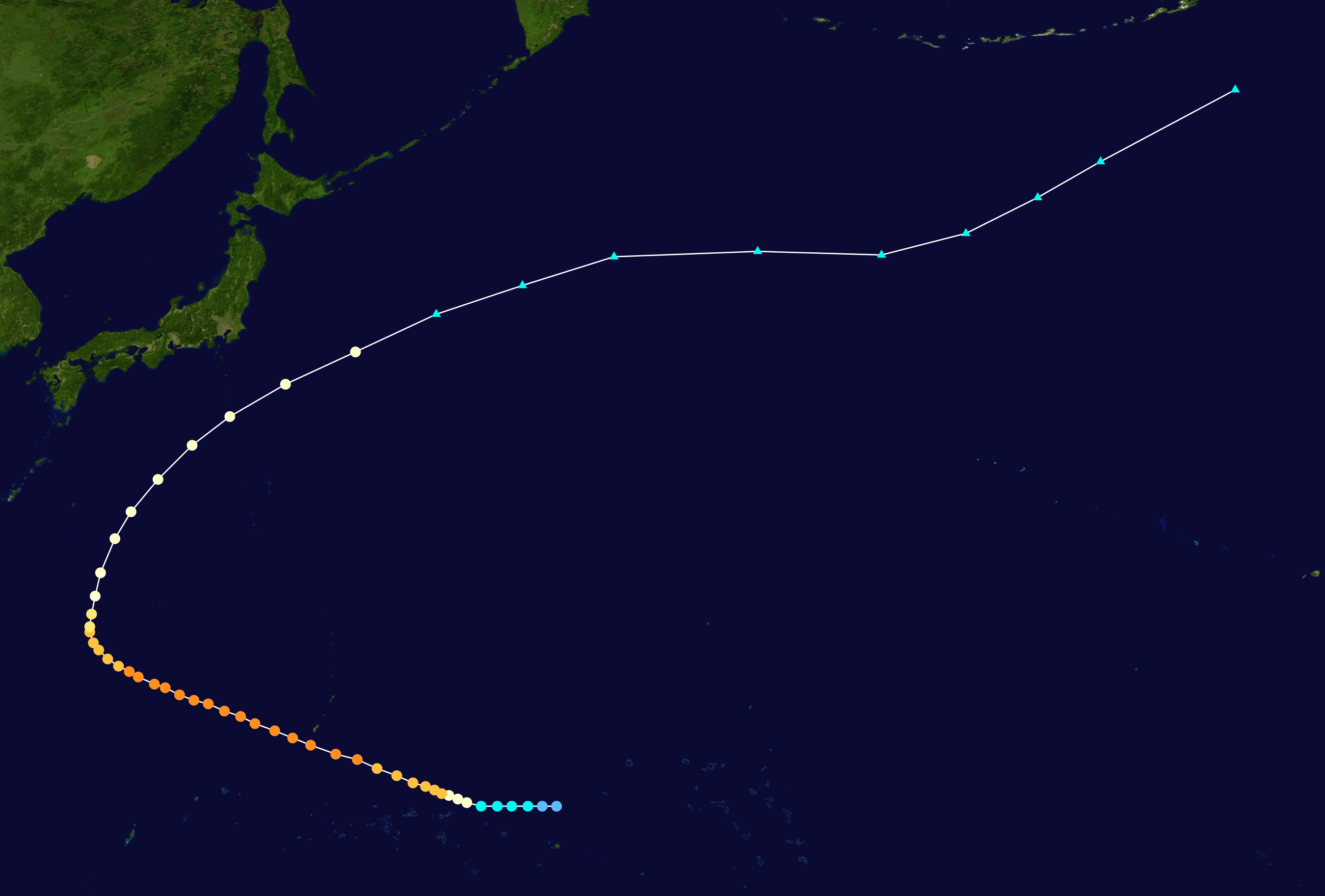
- Duration: November 13 – November 24
- Peak intensity: 230 km/h (145 mph) (1-min); 884 hPa (mbar)

On 10 November, Kwajalein experienced the first effects of a storm which later developed into Typhoon Allyn. The torrential rains and a wind shift indicative of a vortex induced the Kwajalein forecaster to release a tropical advisory (TROPAD) alerting the Typhoon Warning Network. As the storm continued to move westward it rapidly intensified. The first reconnaissance flight established the center of the storm, then north of Truk reported maximum winds of 60 knots. Three days later when the storm approached Guam, the winds had increased to 120 knots. On 17 November, Typhoon Allyn struck Guam with a ferocity unequaled since 1900. Passing within 35 miles of the southern end of the island, the storm created havoc on a grand scale. There were no deaths, even among the natives who were lacking typhoon shelters and endured the storm in their houses, hundreds of which were completely destroyed. By early morning on the 18th, the populace was able to leave their shelter to survey the destruction which amounted to millions of dollars. Allyn continued along a west northwesterly track apparently headed for Okinawa; however, recurvature occurred, and the typhoon passed south of Japan, lashing Torishima with 80 knot winds before extratropical transition and setting course for the Aleutian low.

=== Tropical Storm Betty ===
- Typhoon (JMA)
- Tropical storm (SSHWS)
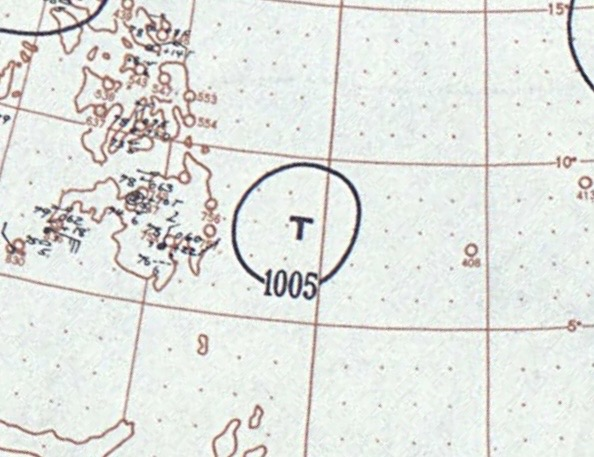
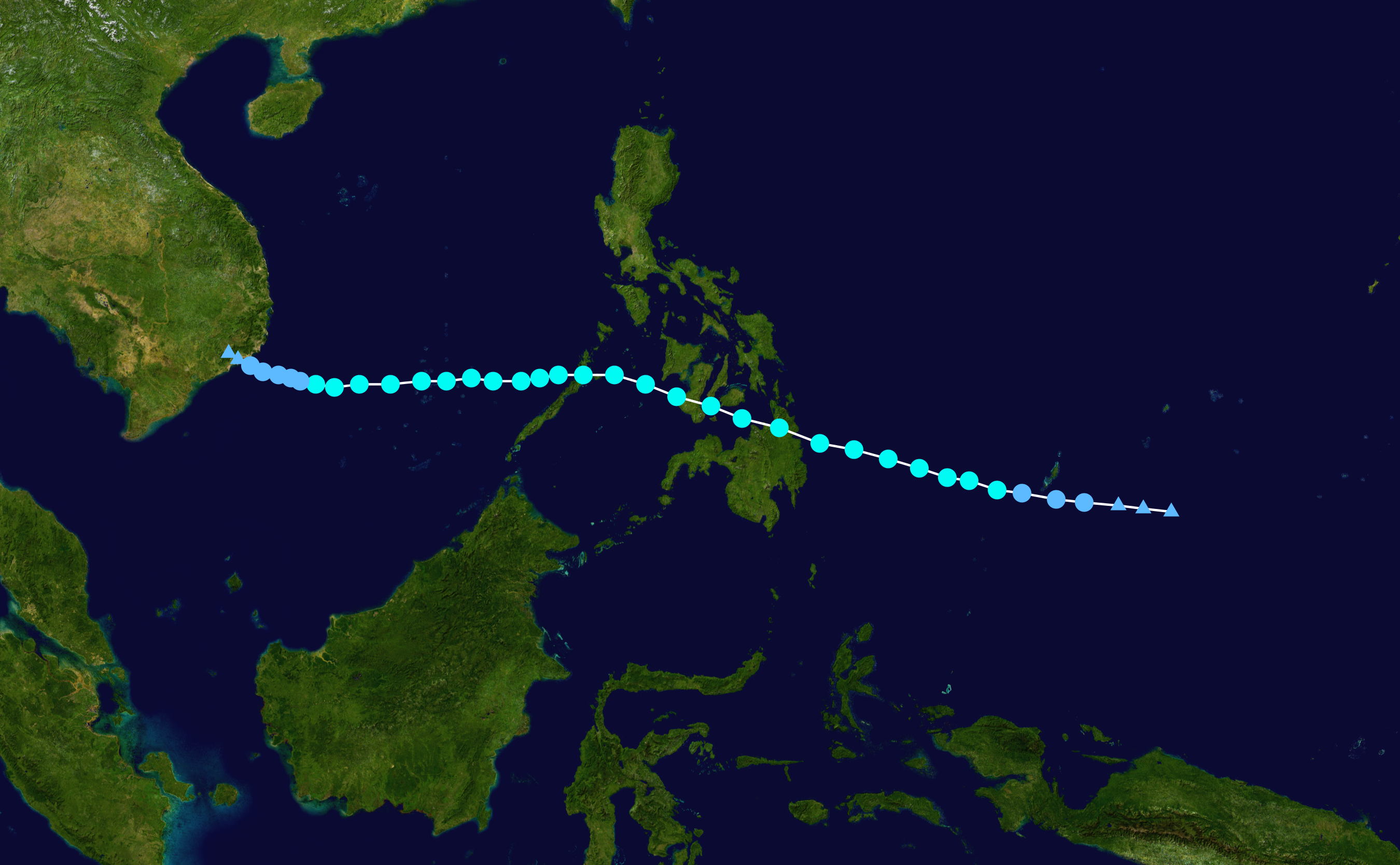
- Duration: December 1 – December 9
- Peak intensity: 110 km/h (70 mph) (1-min); 976 hPa (mbar)

Tropical Cyclone Betty, a small but reportedly intense storm developed in the Yap-Palau area December 2 and 3 then moved west northwestward through the South Central Philippine Islands at an average speed of 12 knots. Although the first reconnaissance fix on 3 December estimated the winds at 80 knots, the light surface winds which were reported as the storm moved through the Philippines indicate that Betty probably never exceeded 50 knots intensity. Thus ended one of the weaker and more obscure storms of the season.

=== Typhoon Camilla ===
- Typhoon (JMA)
- Category 2 typhoon (SSHWS)
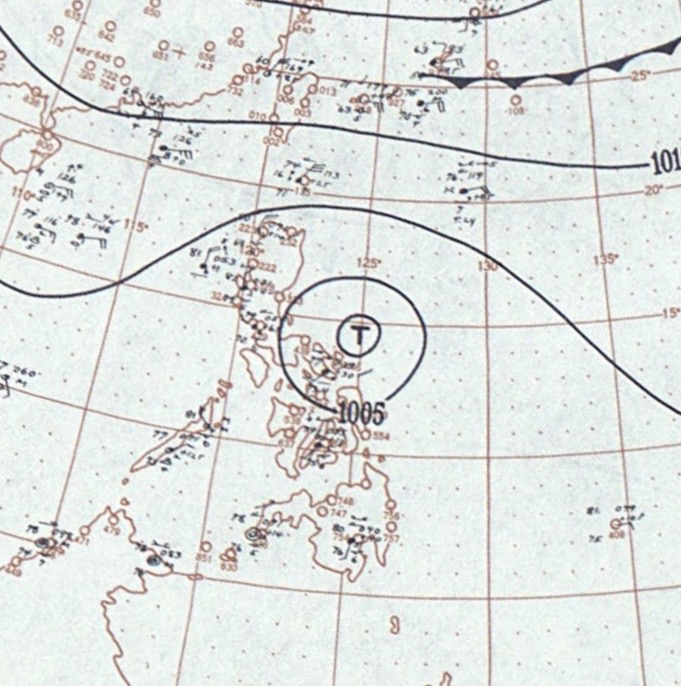
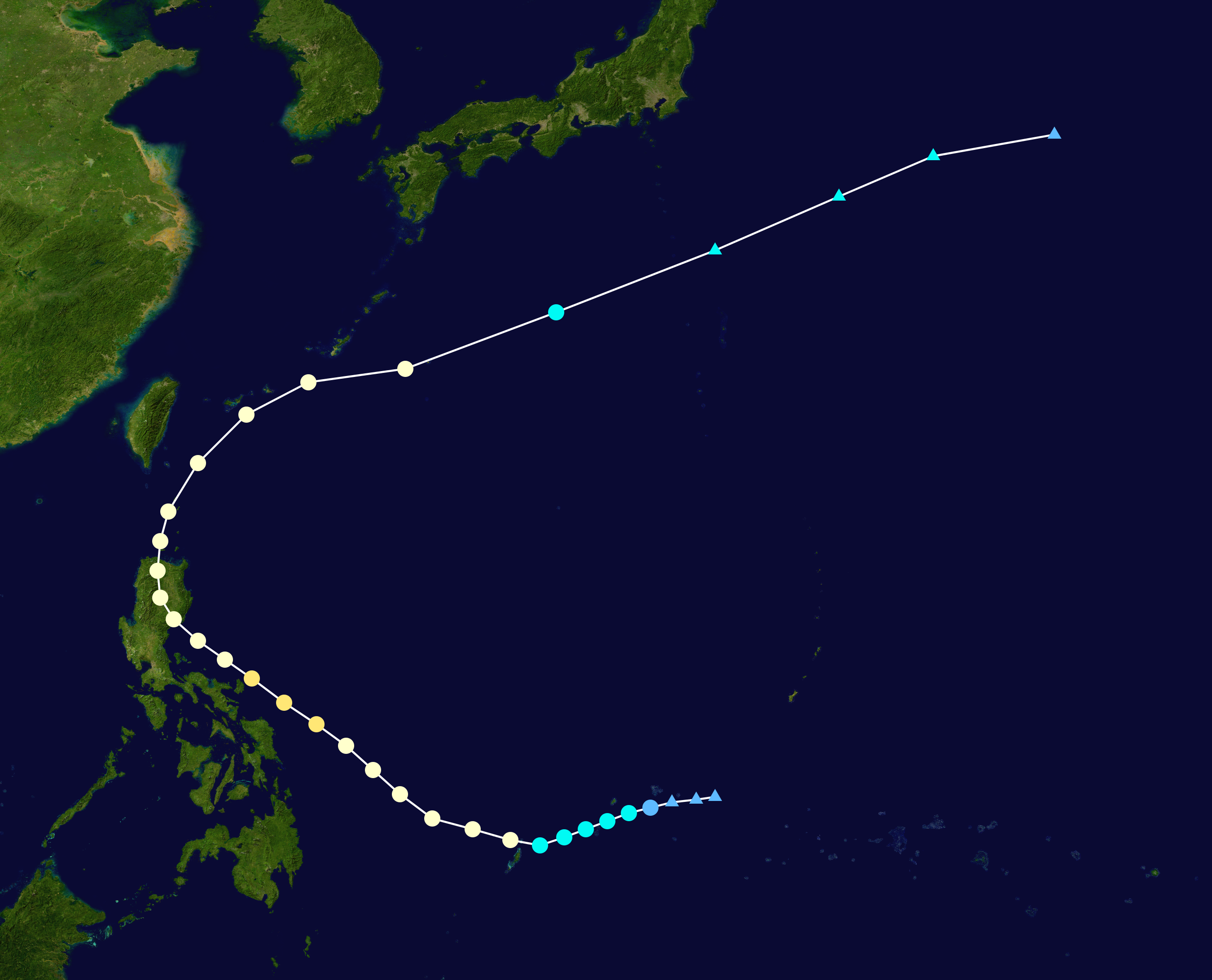
- Duration: December 7 – December 14
- Peak intensity: 155 km/h (100 mph) (1-min); 973 hPa (mbar)

Camilla, the final significant storm of the 1949 typhoon season was the ninth tropical cyclone to intensify in the Yap-Palau area. Similar to other late season storms; Camilla moved west northwestward across the Philippines at an average speed of 12 knots. Here, Camilla departed from the climatological tracks curving northward across northern Luzon, weakening while crossing the mountainous area. Camilla then continued to move northeastward along the polar though, accelerating rapidly and becoming extratropical just east of Okinawa.

== Storm names ==
Tropical storm names were assigned by the Joint Typhoon Warning Center since 1945.

Carmen	Della	Elaine	Faye	Gloria	Hester	Irma	Judith	Kitty
Lise	Madeline	Nelly	Omelia	Patricia	Rena	Allyn	Betty	Camilla

After the season the names Judith, Kitty, Lise, Madeline, Nelly, Omelia, Patricia, Rena, Allyn and Camilla were retired. They were replaced by Judy, Kit, Lola, Mamie, Nina, Ophelia, Phyllis, Rita, Alice and Cora and were next used during the 1953 season.

== See also ==
- List of Pacific typhoon seasons
- 1949 Atlantic hurricane season
- 1900–1950 South-West Indian Ocean cyclone seasons
- 1940s Australian region cyclone seasons
- 1940s South Pacific cyclone seasons
