= Henna (disambiguation) =

Henna is a dye made from the plant Lawsonia inermis.

Henna may also refer to:

- Henna (name), including a list of people with given name or surname
- Henna, Iran, a village
- Enna, or Henna, a city in Sicily, Italy
- Henna (film), a 1991 Indian musical romantic drama
- "Henna" (song), by Cameron Cartio featuring Khaled, 2005
- Henna (ship), a cruise ship, earlier MS Jubilee

== See also ==
- Hanna (disambiguation)
- Hannah (disambiguation)
- Heena (disambiguation)
- Hennah, a surname
- Hina (disambiguation)
- Hinna, a borough of the city of Stavanger, Norway
- Abu Hena (disambiguation)
- Henna ceremony, an Arabic wedding ritual
