= Hannah =

Hannah may refer to:

== People, biblical figures, and fictional characters ==
- Hannah (name), including a list of people and fictional characters with the name
- Hannah (biblical figure), mother of Samuel

== Places ==
=== United States ===
- Hannah, Georgia, an unincorporated community
- Hannah, Michigan, a community
- Hannah, North Dakota, a city
- Hannah, South Carolina, an unincorporated community
- Hannah Run, a stream in Ohio

=== Elsewhere ===
- Hannah, a small village in Hannah cum Hagnaby, a civil parish in Lincolnshire, England
- Hannah Island (Greenland)

== Ships ==
- USS Hannah, an American naval vessel of the American Revolution
- Hannah (ship), various ships

== Film and television ==
- Hannah (2017 film), an Italian film
- Hannah (1997 film), an Austrian film

== Music ==
- Hannah (oratorio), by Christopher Smart with a score composed by John Worgan
- Hannah (Australian singer) (born 1978), Australian pop singer, songwriter and musician
- Hannah (Austrian singer), 21st century Austrian singer Hannah Hofer
- Hannah Ild (born 1981), Estonian singer known by the mononym Hannah
- "Hannah", a song from the album Twice Removed from Yesterday by Robin Trower
- "Hannah", a song from the album Trouble by Ray LaMontagne

== Other uses ==
- Hannah (horse), a racehorse
- Hanna-Barbera, an American animation studio
- List of storms named Hannah, various tropical cyclones

== See also ==
- Anna (disambiguation)
- Hana (disambiguation)
- Hanna (disambiguation)
- Red Hannah, alternate name for a pillory
- Han-na, a Korean given name
