= Hanna =

Hanna may refer to:

== People ==
- Hanna (Arabic name), a family and a male given name of Christian Arab origin
- Hanna (given name), a given name
- Hanna (surname), a family name of Irish origin

== Places ==
=== United States ===
- Hanna City, Illinois, a village
- Hanna, Indiana, an unincorporated community and census-designated place
- Hanna Township, LaPorte County, Indiana
- Hanna, Louisiana, an unincorporated community
- Hanna, Missouri, a ghost town
- Hanna, Oklahoma, a town
- Hanna, South Dakota, an unincorporated community
- Hanna, Utah, an unincorporated community
- Hanna, West Virginia, an unincorporated community
- Hanna, Wyoming, a town

=== Elsewhere ===
- Hanna, Alberta, a town in Canada
- Haná (German: Hanna), an ethnic region in the Czech Republic
- Hanna, Lublin Voivodeship, a village in Poland
- Hanna Lake, a lake in Pakistan

== Ships ==
- USS Hanna, a destroyer escort acquired by the U.S. Navy during World War II

== Film and television ==
- Hanna (film), a 2011 European-American film
  - Hanna (soundtrack), the soundtrack of the 2011 film
- Hanna (TV series), a 2019 TV series based on the 2011 film

== Other uses ==
- List of storms named Hanna, various tropical cyclones
- Hanna-Barbera, American animation studio

== See also ==
- Hana (disambiguation)
- Han-na
- Hannah (disambiguation)
