= Hana =

Hana or HANA may refer to:

== Places ==
=== Europe ===
- Haná, an ethnographic region in the Czech Republic
- Haná (river), a river in the Czech Republic
- Traianoupoli, Greece, called Hana during the Ottoman period
- Hana, Norway, a borough in the city of Sandnes, Norway

=== West Asia ===
- Hana, Iran, a city in Isfahan Province, Iran
- Hana, Fars, a village in Fars Province, Iran
- Hana, Kerman, a village in Kerman Province, Iran
- Hana Rural District (disambiguation), in Iran
- Kingdom of Ḫana, a Bronze Age Kingdom in the middle Euphrates region

=== Pacific ===
- Hana, Hawaii, a census-designated place in the United States
  - Hana Highway, a road in Hawaii

=== Africa ===
- Hana, Ethiopia, a town in the woredas of Selamago in Ethiopia

== People ==
- Hana (given name), a given name and list of people with the name
- Anders Hana (born 1982), Norwegian musician and marine biologist
- Ben Hana (1957–2012), Wellington, New Zealand vagrant
- Hajime Hana (1930–1993), Japanese actor
- Rabbah bar bar Hana, Jewish Talmudist who lived in Babylonia
- Sonya Hana (1927–2007), British ballerina and actress

== Music ==
=== Musicians ===
- Hana (American musician), stage name of American singer-songwriter and producer Hana Pestle
- Hana, an American duo consisting of Jeff Greinke and former Sky Cries Mary vocalist Anisa Romero
- Hana (South Korean singer), South Korean singer, songwriter and actress
- Hana Kuk, a Chinese singer-songwriter known mononymously as HANA
- Hana (group), a Japanese girl group formed in 2025

=== Albums ===
- Hana (Sophie Ellis-Bextor album), 2023
- Hana (Hana album), 2026
- Hana, a 2009 K-pop album by Supernova
- Hana, a 2003 album by Sonim

=== Songs ===
- "Hana" (Fujii Kaze song) (花), a song by Fujii Kaze
- "Hana" (Orange Range song) (花), a song by Orange Range
- "Hana (Mémento Mori)", a 1996 song by Mr. Children
- "Hana" (jealkb song) (花), Japanese song by jealkb
- "Hana" (Kousuke Atari song) (花), Japanese song by Kousuke Atari
- "Hana" (Oyunaa song) (花), Japanese song by Oyunaa
- "Hana" (Mariko Kouda song) (花), Japanese song by Mariko Kouda
- "Hana", a 2007 song by Joni Mitchell from Shine
- "Hana" (花), a song by Rentarō Taki

== Acronyms ==
- High-Definition Audio-Video Network Alliance, a disbanded organization supporting IEEE 1394 applications
- SAP HANA, a column-oriented, in-memory database appliance from SAP SE

== Other uses ==
- Hana or Hëna (Albanian paganism), the Moon in Albanian ethnic religion
- Hana (insect), a genus of fossil insects in the order Palaeodictyoptera
- Hana (film), a 2006 Japanese black comedy by Hirokazu Koreeda
- Hana Financial Group, a South Korean holding company
- Hana, a character in Kamen Rider Den-O
- The transliterated Korean name for the number "1"
- Hana, a flexible office space subsidiary of CBRE
- Hana, a brand name of desogestrel

== See also ==
- Hannah (disambiguation)
