= Hurricane Hannah (disambiguation) =

Hurricane Hannah was a 1959 Category 3 Atlantic hurricane.

Hurricane Hannah may also refer to:

- List of storms named Hannah, an erroneous reference to any of the mentioned cyclones
- Bob Hannah (born 1956), American motocross racer nicknamed Hurricane Hannah
- "Hurricane Hannah", the 51st episode in the English Vitello Productions dub of the Japanese manga series Crayon Shin-chan
- "Hurricane Hannah", an episode of Walt Disney's Wonderful World of Color
- Hurricane Hannah, a fictional hurricane unleashed by Kosmo the Inscrutable in the American video game Voodoo Vince

== See also ==
- Hurricane Hannah's Waterpark, the name of Hurricane Harbor from 2004 to 2006 at Geauga Lake & Wildwater Kingdom Amusement Park, Ohio, United States
- Hannah Storm (born 1962), American journalist
- Hannah (disambiguation)
