= Hena =

Hena may refer to:

- Hēna, a Sinhalese caste of washers
- Hena, Iran, a village in Fars Province, Iran
- Hëna (Albanian paganism), the Moon in Albanian ethnic religion
- Henna (Lawsonia inermis), a flowering plant, or the dye made from it
- Erhu, a traditional Chinese musical instrument known as hena in Taiwan

== See also ==
- Heena (disambiguation)
