= Hina =

Hina may refer to:

== People and deities ==
- Hina (given name), including a list of people and fictional characters with the name
- Hina (goddess), the name assigned to a number of Polynesian deities.
- Hina (wrestler), Japanese professional wrestler
- Hina, member of South Korean group Lightsum
- Hina, member of South Korean band QWER

== Other uses ==
- Hina, Cameroon, a town
- Hina language, a Chadic language spoken in northern Cameroon
- HINA (Hrvatska izvještajna novinska agencija), the Croatian news agency
- Hina, a synonym of Gasparia, a genus of spiders
- List of storms named Hina, several tropical cyclones

== See also ==
- Henna, a dye, and the temporary body art resulting from the staining of the skin from the dyes
- Hinamatsuri, or Girls' Day, is a religious holiday in Japan
- Heena (disambiguation)
