= Galu =

Galu may refer to:

- Galu, Iran (disambiguation)
- Galu, Kenya
- Galu, Romania
