= Hina (given name) =

Hina is a feminine given name. In South Asia (Urdu: حنا), it is derived from Henna. In Japan, it is derived from light or sun. In the Pacific Islands, it is derived from a goddess of various Polynesian cultures. Notable people with the name include:

== Given name ==
- Hina (wrestler) (born 2006), Japanese professional wrestler
- Hina Afridi (born 2001), Pakistani actress
- Hina Akechi (born 2005), Japanese badminton player
- Hina Altaf (born 1992), Pakistani television actress, presenter, and video jockey
- Hina Aoyama (born 1970), Japanese paper-cutting artist and illustrator
- Hina Bano (born 2004), Indian field hockey player
- Hina Khawaja Bayat (born 1964), Pakistani actress
- Hina Bokhari (born 1975), British politician and educator
- Hina Pervaiz Butt (born 1982), Pakistani politician
- Hina Dastagir, Pakistani politician
- Hina Dilpazeer (born 1969), Pakistani actress, model, TV host and singer
- Hina Hayata (早田 ひな; born 2000), Japanese table tennis player
- Hina Ikahehegi (born 2003), French rugby union player
- Hina Inoue (born 2003), American tennis player
- Hina Iwasaki (born 1993), Japanese politician
- Hina Jamelle, American architect
- Hina Javed (born 1989), Pakistani actress
- Hina Jilani (born 1953), Pakistani lawyer and activist
- Hina Kamimura (神村 ひな), Japanese voice actress
- Hina Kaware (born 1982), Indian politician and a member of the INC
- Hina Khan (born 1987), Indian actress
- Hina Rabbani Khar (born 1977), Pakistani stateswoman and economist
- Hina Kino (木野 日菜; born 1997), Japanese voice actress
- Hina Rizvi (born 1981), Pakistani actress
- Hina Saleem (1985–2006), a Pakistani woman killed in an honour killing in Italy
- Hina Shah, Indian entrepreneur
- Hina Shaheen (born 1971), Pakistani TV, film stage actress and stage dancer
- Hina Spani (1890–1969), Argentine soprano
- Hina Sugita (杉田 妃和; born 1997), Japanese women's footballer
- Hina Suguta (直田 姫奈; born 1995), Japanese voice actress
- Hina Tachibana (立花 日菜), Japanese voice actress
- Hina Tasleem, German actress
- Hina Arshad Warraich, Pakistani politician
- Hina Yōmiya (羊宮 妃那; born 2000), Japanese voice actress
- Hina-au-kekele, a Hawaiian lady and the wife of the chief Pilikaʻaie
- Hineuki, a Hawaiian lady whose full name was Hina–keʻuki

== Fictional characters ==
- Aoi "Hina" Asahina (朝日奈 葵), a character from the Danganronpa franchise
- Hina Hikawa (氷川 日菜), a character in the media franchise BanG Dream!
- Hina Kagiyama, a character from the Touhou Project franchise
- Hina Sorasaki, a character from Blue Archive
- Hina Kudo, a character from the TV drama series Mr. Sunshine
- Hina, an animated character appearing in Girls Band Cry
- Hina Chōno (蝶野 雛), a character from the Blue Box manga and anime series
- Hina Amano (天野 陽菜), a character from the 2019 animated film Weathering with You

== See also ==
- Hina (goddess)
