= Galu, Iran =

Galu or Galv (Persian: گلو) in Iran may refer to:

- Galu, East Azerbaijan
- Galv, East Azerbaijan
- Galu, Anbarabad, Kerman Province
- Galu, Jiroft, Kerman Province
- Galu, West Azerbaijan
