= Hannah (ship) =

Several ships have been named Hannah:

- Hannah (HBC ship), Hudson's Bay Company sailor Christopher Middleton (navigator)'s first command, in 1725
- Hannah (1786 ship) was built at Liverpool. She made six complete voyages as a slave ship. French frigates captured her in 1794 as she was sailing to West Africa outward bound on her seventh slave trading voyage.
- Hannah (1793 ship) was launched at Whitby. Her owner in 1796 transferred her registry from Whitby to London. She traded with the Baltic, between London and Liverpool, and then the Baltic again. A Spanish privateer captured her in 1805.
- Hannah (1795 ship) was launched at Liverpool. She was a slave ship that wrecked in 1802 on her way back to England from Jamaica after her fourth slave trading voyage.
- Hannah (1797 ship) was built at Liverpool. She made three voyages as a slave ship, and then one as a whaler. Next, she became a West Indiaman and was wrecked in 1811.
- Hannah (1811 ship) was launched at Bombay Dockyard. Shortly after she was launched, she sailed to England on a voyage for the British East India Company (EIC), where her owners sold her to British owners. She engaged in a single-ship action in 1814 in which she repelled an American privateer. She participated as a transport in a punitive expedition in 1819-1820 to Ras al-Khaimah in the Persian Gulf. She was last listed in 1833.
- Hannah (1849 ship) was a brig built at Norton, New Brunswick, Canada in 1826. She transported emigrants to Canada during the Irish Famine. She is known for the terrible circumstances of her 1849 shipwreck, in which the captain and two officers left the sinking ship aboard the only lifeboat, leaving passengers and the rest of the crew to fend for themselves.

== See also ==
- HM gunboat Hannah (1803) was a small gun vessel that the Royal Navy hired in 1803. Originally she served on the Irish Station. However, she was in the Mediterranean serving as a tender to HMS Queen when a Spanish privateer captured her in 1806 in a single-ship action.
- USS Hanna (DE-449), a destroyer escort acquired by the U.S. Navy during World War II
- USS Hannah, an American naval vessel of the American Revolution
