= Hannah (1786 ship) =

History

Great Britain
- Name: Hannah
- Owner: 1786:Benjamin Heywood; 1788:Thomas Leyland & Moses Benson; 1790:Thomas Leyland, Moses Benson, & Charles Wilson; 1792:Thomas Leyland & Charles Wilson
- Builder: Liverpool
- Launched: 1786
- Captured: 1794

General characteristics
- Tons burthen: 192, or 201 (bm)
- Length: 84 ft 3 in (25.7 m)
- Beam: 23 ft 2 in (7.1 m)
- Complement: 1793:40; 1794:20
- Armament: 1793:14 × 4-pounder guns; 1794:16 × 4-pounder guns

Hannah was built at Liverpool in 1786. She made six complete voyages as a slave ship. French frigates captured her in 1794 as she was sailing to West Africa outward bound on her seventh slave trading voyage.

== Career ==
Hannah first appeared in Lloyd's Register (LR) in 1786 with J. Smith, master, Heywood, owner, and trade Liverpool–Africa.

1st slave trading voyage (1786–1787): Captain Bryan Smith sailed from Liverpool on 4 August 1786. Hannah started gathering slaves on 5 October at Calabar. She embarked 420 slaves and delivered them to St Vincent on 31 January 1787. There she landed 390 slaves, for a 7% loss rate in the Middle Passage, which had taken 51 days.

2nd slave trading voyage (1787–1789): Captain Charles Wilson sailed from Liverpool on 5 May 1788. Hannah gathered slaves at New Calabar. She arrived at Grenada in January 1789 and landed 351 slaves there. She left Grenada on 12 February and arrived back Liverpool on 5 April. She had left Liverpool with 34 crew members and had two crew deaths on the voyage.

3rd slave trading voyage (1789–1790): Captain Wilson sailed from Liverpool on 3 July 1789. Hannah gathered slaves at New Calabar and at Bonny Island that she delivered to Kingston, Jamaica, on 31 December. She landed 303 slaves. On 10 April 1790 she sailed from Kingston and she arrived back at Liverpool on 27 May. She had left Liverpool with 30 crew members.

4th slave trading voyage (1790–1791): Captain William Young sailed from Liverpool on 30 October 1790. Hannah started gathering slaves at Bonny on 4 January 1791. She arrived at St Vincent on 11 July, where she landed 316 slaves. She had embarked 341 so had a mortality rate among the slaves of 7%. She sailed from St Vincent on 1 August and arrived back at Liverpool on 25 September. She had left with 30 crew members and had lost seven crew members on her voyage.

5th slave trading voyage (1792): Captain Young sailed from Liverpool on 9 January 1792. Hannah gathered slaves at the Congo River and delivered them to Grenada in August. There she landed 331. She arrived back at Liverpool on 5 October, having left with 29 crew members and having suffered one crew member death on the voyage.

6th slave trading voyage (1793–1794): Hannah sailed from Liverpool on 1 January 1793 on her sixth voyage. Shortly after she left War with France broke out. Captain Young acquired a letter of marque on 28 February 1793. Hannah arrived at Ambriz on 31 March and commenced gathering slaves. She embarked 338 slaves and delivered them to Kingston on 27 July, where she landed 304, for a 9% mortality rate. She left Jamaica on 12 October and arrived back at Liverpool on 14 January 1794. She had left Liverpool with 30 crew members and had three crew deaths on the voyage.

7th slave trading voyage (1794–loss): Captain William Stringer acquired a letter of marque on 11 March 1794. He sailed from Liverpool on 17 March, bound for West Africa.

== Fate ==
In July 1794 Lloyd's List reported that two French frigates had captured at least four British vessels off Madeira. Two, Tom, Galt, master, and Hannah, Stringen, master, were on their way to Africa. Forty-six people, part of the crews of the four vessels, were landed at Madeira.

Captain William Stringer later was captain on another Hannah on her first slave trading voyage in 1797.
