= Abimelech (oratorio) =

Christopher Smart oratorio

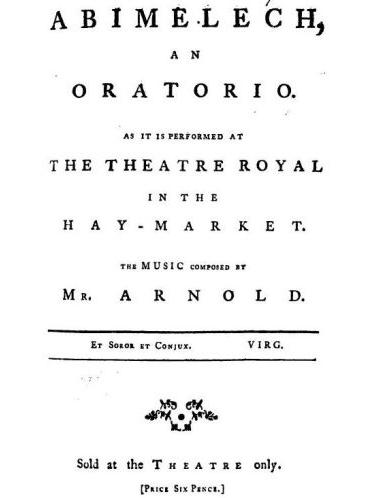
Title page of Abimelech libretto

Abimelech is an oratorio in three acts written by Christopher Smart and put to music by Samuel Arnold. It was first performed in the Haymarket Theatre in 1768. A heavily revised version of the oratorio ran at Covent Garden in 1772. Abimelech was the second of two oratorio librettos written by Smart, the first being Hannah written in 1764. Just like Hannah, Abimelech ran for only one night, each time. It was to be Smart's last work dedicated to an adult audience.

Abimelech retells the biblical story of Abraham and Sarah when they met the King of Gerar, Abimelech, and he tries to take Sarah as his wife. After God intervenes in a dream, Sarah, who was previously barren, is restored to Abraham and made fertile. The oratorio emphasizes the sexual jealousy and the sexual fidelity of spouses.

== Background ==
Years before, Smart wrote a libretto for an oratorio called Hannah. Like Hannah, Smart most likely wrote the work out of a need to earn money. However, his previous oratorio only lasted a few nights, and Smart hoped that his second could succeed where the other failed. This would be the last work in Smart's final years that was written completely for adults.

An advertisement for Abimelech ran in the "Musical Intelligencer" section of the Public Advertiser on 16 March, which said:

"YOUNG Abimilech will be exercised on Foote's Theatrical Heath on Wednesday next, when he will run three Trial-heats. He was bred by the celebrated Kit Crazy, who rode flying Pegasus the great Match round the Hop-Garden and who is universally allowed to be a SMART Fellow, and a tolerable Psalmodist. Abimilech is half Brothers to Saul, which beat Sampson on Friday 19th of February, tho' the Odds in the upper half of the Scaffold were Three and a Half to One. Abimilech has been a long while in Training under little Arnold, a Man of sound-Knowledge, who tho' of a diminutive Size, hath such amazing Strength in his Composition, that, when he gets with his Airs, he will seize on any Man alive, and take him by the Ears."

— Mounsey p. 270

Abimelech was performed once at the Theatre Royal on 18 March 1768 and once, after Smart's death, at Covent Garden on 25 March 1772. There are no surviving scores for Abimelech, but the libretto was sold during its run at the Theatre Royal, Haymarket, in 1768 and the run of the revised version of the oratorio at Covent Garden in 1772. These works were published anonymously but Charles Burney, Smart's friend, attributes the libretto to Smart and pasticcios from Handel in his General History of Music. The "pasticcios" were musical selections from Handel used by the composer Samuel Arnold.

== Abimelech ==
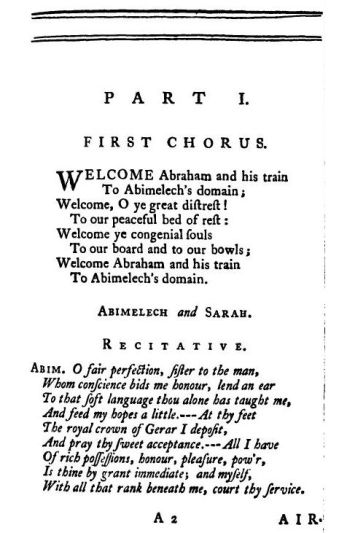
First page of Abimelech libretto

Abimelech tells the story of Abraham and Sarah at Gerar (Genesis 20) in three acts. Although there are multiple versions of the story with different characters, Smart relies on the version in which Abraham pretends that Sarah is his sister, and the king of Gerar, Abimilech, wishes to marry her. God intervenes by telling Abimelech that Sarah is married and should be returned to Abraham; Abimelech returns Sarah to Abraham but criticizes Abraham for lying. The oratorio leaves out the final portion of Abimelech's biblical story in which Sarah is made fertile by God along with Abimelech's women.

There is an emphasis on the sexual jealousy of Abraham over Abimelech's treatment of Sarah. This was partly done for "theatrical effect". However, there is also an emphasis on the impious actions of the Gentiles of Gerar and of their inability to love properly, especially when Hagar sings:

Lo, her ears
Have suffer'd profanation from the lips
Of an enamour'd Gentile - Couldst think,
That men remoter from the truth of God,
And more of brutal nature, should controul
Their appetite from such a form as Sarah's?

(Abimelech 94-99)

As the oratorio continues, there is emphasis that only those who follow the true God are capable of understanding the proper ways to act.

=== Roles ===
- Abraham
- King Abimelech
- Phichol Chief Captain
- Sarah
- Hagar
- Queen of Gerar
- Officers, soldiers, and other attendants

== Critical response ==
After the second version of Abimelech ran at the Covent Garden, a reviewer in The Theatrical Review claimed that the oratorio was changed "greatly for the better". Another review in The Theatrical Review claimed that Abimelech was "a very pleasing Oratorio, though there is great sameness in the songs, but the chorusses are masterly and grand". Later, Thomas Busby claimed that "the applause obtained by this his second oratorical production [Abimelech], established the reputation of its composer [Arnold]".

The Monthly Review and Critical Review ignored Abimelech, which prompted Arthur Sherbo, a later critic, to claim that they "were kind to Smart and Arnold" for their silence. Another later critic, Moira Dearnley, said, "devotion and human relationships is uneasy, not to say ridiculous." Another critic, Frances Anderson, said: "it was not reprinted and seemed of mediocre quality". However, this turned out to be untrue.
