= Hurricane Hanna (2008) =

Category 1 Atlantic hurricane in 2008

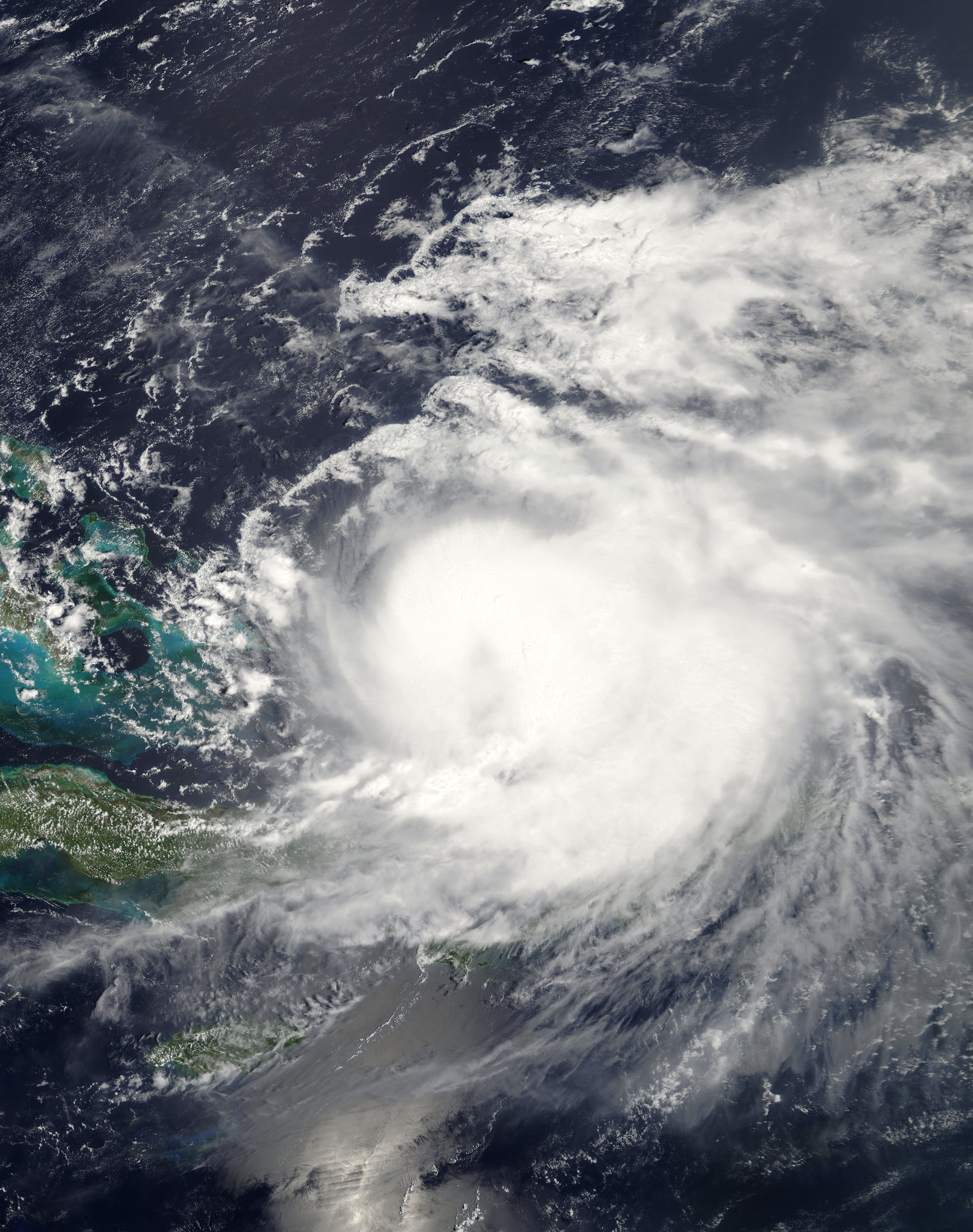
- Hanna at peak intensity over the Turks and Caicos Islands on September 1

Meteorological history
- Formed: August 28, 2008
- Extratropical: September 7, 2008
- Dissipated: September 12, 2008

Category 1 hurricane
- 1-minute sustained (SSHWS/NWS)
- Highest winds: 85 mph (140 km/h)
- Lowest pressure: 977 mbar (hPa); 28.85 inHg

Overall effects
- Fatalities: ~537 total
- Damage: $160 million (2008 USD)
- Areas affected: Puerto Rico, Turks and Caicos Islands, Bahamas, Hispaniola, Eastern Seaboard, Atlantic Canada, South Carolina North Carolina
- IBTrACS
- Part of the 2008 Atlantic hurricane season

Hurricane Hanna was a moderately powerful but deadly tropical cyclone that caused extensive damage across the Western Atlantic, mostly in the Turks and Caicos Islands and the East Coast of the United States. The eighth named storm and fourth hurricane of the 2008 Atlantic hurricane season. It formed east-northeast of the northern Leeward Islands on August 28. Initially, the storm struggled to intensify due to moderate wind shear as it moved westwards towards the Bahamas. By August 31, Hanna had drifted southwards and began intensifying while over the Bahamas; it attained its peak intensity as a Category 1 hurricane while over the Turks and Caicos Islands. Due to the outflow of the nearby Hurricane Gustav, Hanna weakened back into a tropical storm the next day as it began to drift northwestwards towards the Southeastern United States. The storm struck Myrtle Beach, South Carolina, before moving up the Eastern Seaboard to become an extratropical cyclone as it moved by New England into Atlantic Canada early on September 7. The system raced across the North Atlantic, sweeping west of Great Britain on September 10 before turning north and becoming absorbed by a stronger extratropical cyclone between Iceland and Greenland late on September 12.

At least 537 deaths were reported (the final death toll will likely never be known), mostly due to flooding in the northern part of Haiti. Hanna also caused $160 million in damages to the U.S., but the exact damage in Haiti is unknown.

== Meteorological history ==
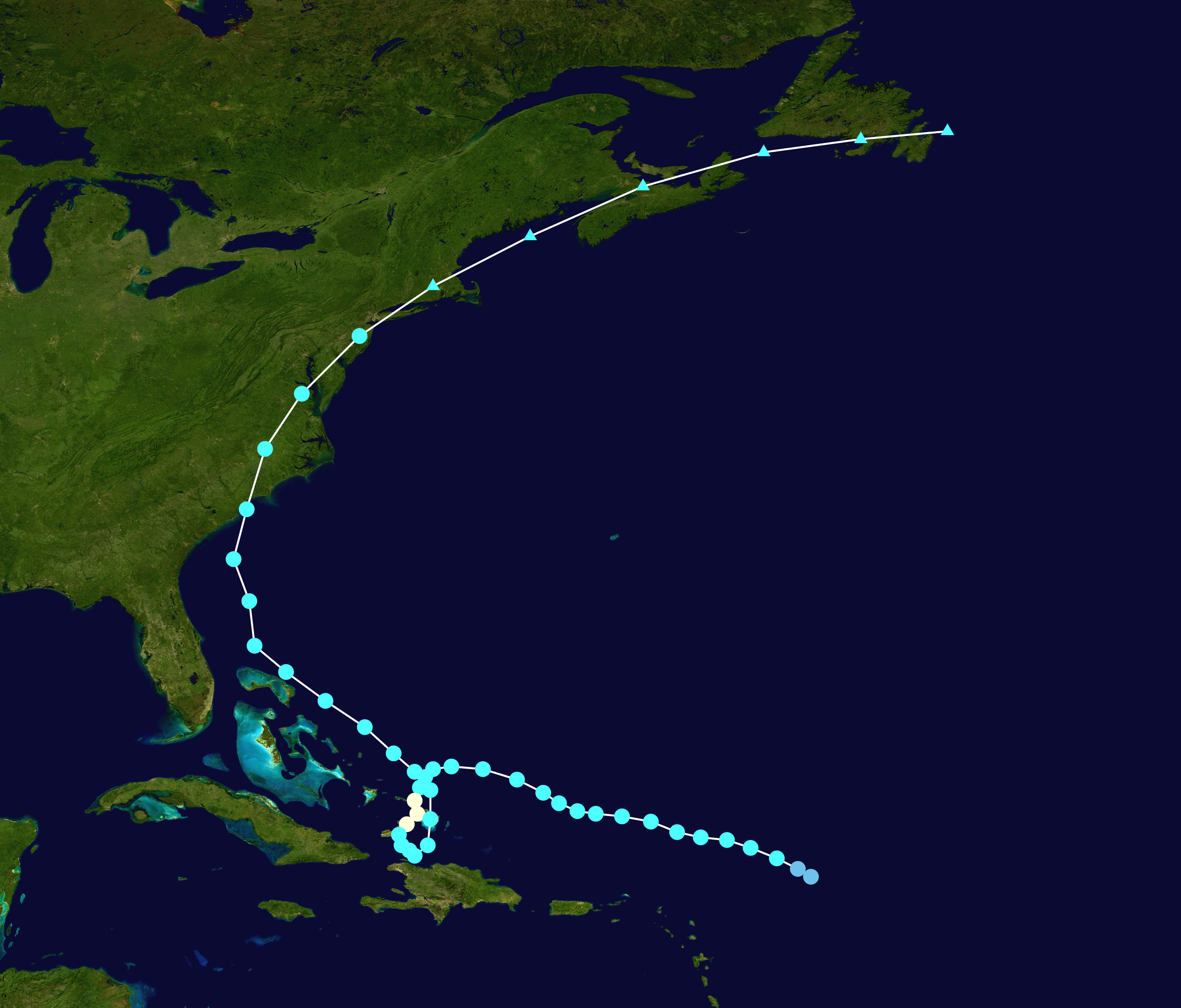
Map plotting the storm's track and intensity, according to the Saffir–Simpson scale Map key Saffir–Simpson scale Tropical depression (≤38 mph, ≤62 km/h) Tropical storm (39–73 mph, 63–118 km/h) Category 1 (74–95 mph, 119–153 km/h) Category 2 (96–110 mph, 154–177 km/h) Category 3 (111–129 mph, 178–208 km/h) Category 4 (130–156 mph, 209–251 km/h) Category 5 (≥157 mph, ≥252 km/h) Unknown Storm type Tropical cyclone Subtropical cyclone Extratropical cyclone, remnant low, tropical disturbance, or monsoon depression

On August 19, a tropical wave emerged off the coast of Africa and tracked westward across the Atlantic Ocean. After several days, an associated area of low pressure gained deep convection and organization. On August 28, while to the east-northeast of the northern Leeward Islands, the low formed into Tropical Depression Eight. Later that day, it attained tropical storm status, and as such was named Hanna by the National Hurricane Center. At the time, the low-level center of circulation was partially exposed on the western edge of the mass of convection, indicating westerly wind shear.

Tracking westward primarily under the steering current of a large ridge to the north, the convective pattern began to redevelop late on August 28. Since forecast, models predicted the storm would weaken and move southwestward due to outflow associated with nearby Hurricane Gustav. Despite this, the storm began entering a favorable environment, and was forecast to intensify. An upper-level low that had been producing wind shear moved away from the system, though light shear continued. At the same time, the low-level center once again became separated from the convection, which was primarily confined to a cyclonic banding feature in the eastern half of the circulation. It remained weak as it moved erratically westward while east of the Bahamas on August 30. Due to the influence of Hurricane Gustav's large circulation, Hanna suddenly took a sharp southerly turn and slowed down to drift while located to the north of the Turks and Caicos Islands. On September 1, as Hanna drifted to the south-southwest, convection increased and the storm began to intensify. Later that day around 1:30 pm EDT, an Air Force Reconnaissance Aircraft found winds within Hanna supportive of hurricane strength, and the National Hurricane Center upgraded Hanna to a hurricane. Early on September 2, strong wind shear in association with Hurricane Gustav began to affect Hanna and the storm was downgraded to a tropical storm on September 3. Hanna then sharply turned back northward, causing additional damage in Haiti. Over the course of the next three days, Hanna slighted northwestward towards the Bahamas, before turning abruptly north. By September 5, Hanna turned westward towards the Carolinas. Early on September 6, 2008, Hanna made landfall near the South Carolina-North Carolina border. The system became an extratropical cyclone as it moved into Atlantic Canada early on September 7 and raced across the North Atlantic, sweeping west of Great Britain on September 10 before turning north and becoming absorbed by a stronger extratropical cyclone between Iceland and Greenland late on September 12.

== Preparations ==
=== Greater Antilles ===
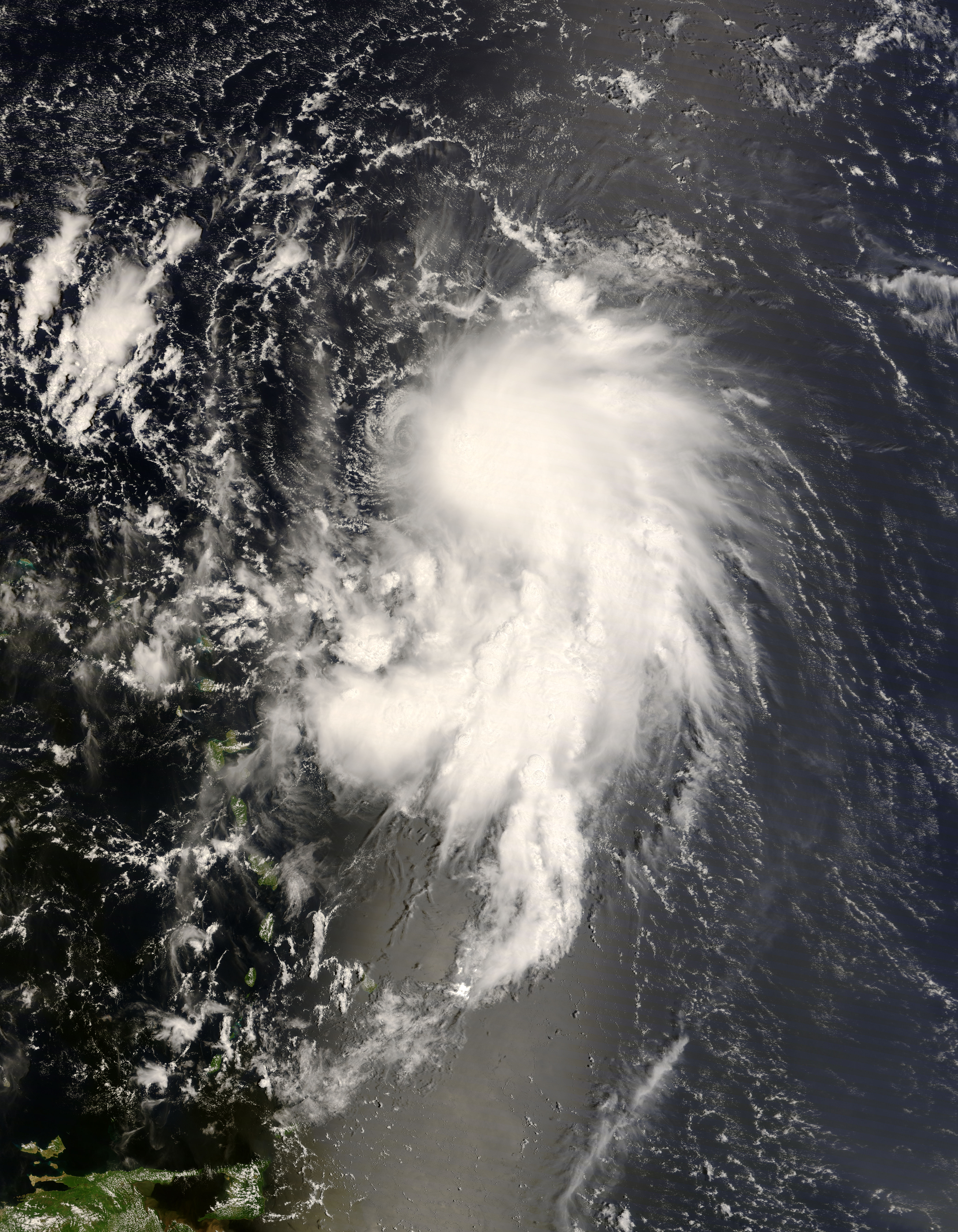
Hanna just north of the Lesser Antilles with its surface circulation displaced to the west of its convection.

The National Hurricane Center and various governments issued multiple tropical cyclone warnings and watches due to the threat of Hanna. In southeastern Bahamas and the Turks and Caicos Islands, a tropical storm watch was posted at 15:00 UTC on August 30. Around 09:00 UTC the next day, the tropical storm watch was upgraded to a tropical storm warning in the Turks and Caicos Islands; six hours later, the watch was also increased in the southeastern Bahamas. Another tropical storm watch was issued for the central Bahamas at 15:00 UTC on August 31 and was upgraded to a tropical storm warning about six hours later. A hurricane watch was put into effect for the central Bahamas on September 1 at 15:00 UTC. Three hours later, all tropical storm warnings were upgraded to hurricane warnings, while the hurricane watch in the central Bahamas was discontinued.

Early on September 3, a hurricane watch was issued for the northwestern Bahamas and switched to a hurricane warning several hours later. That same day, the hurricane warning in effect for the central and southeastern Bahamas, as well as the Turks and Caicos Islands, was downgraded to a tropical storm warning. At 03:00 UTC on September 4, the hurricane warning for the northwestern Bahamas was also decreased to a tropical storm warning. About nine hours later, the tropical storm warning was cancelled for the southeastern Bahamas and the Turks and Caicos Islands. The remaining portion of the tropical storm warning, for the central and northwestern Bahamas, was discontinued late on September 5.

=== The Bahamas ===
In Turks and Caicos Islands, streets were cleared, while schools and airports were closed as Hanna approached. On Providenciales, 800 people stayed in shelters. The storm was predicted to bring up to 12 inches (300 mm) of precipitation to the Turks and Caicos and southeastern Bahamas. In the Bahamas, National Emergency Operations Centre was used to provide advice to the public. All national medical facilities were inspected and equipped with necessary supplies and equipment. About 139 people and 20 others stayed in shelters on Acklins and Long Cay, respectively.

=== Hispaniola ===
Along the northern coast of Haiti, a tropical storm warning was issued from Môle-Saint-Nicolas to the border with Dominican Republic at 15:00 UTC on September 2. Six hours later, the warning area was extended to Port-au-Prince. Simultaneously, another tropical storm warning was issued along the north coast of Dominican Republic from Puerto Plata westward to Bahia de Manzanillo. By 03:00 UTC on September 4, the tropical storm warnings in both countries were discontinued.

=== United States and Canada ===
Tropical Storm Hanna approaching South Carolina on September 5

At 09:00 UTC on September 4, a tropical storm watch was issued from the mouth of the Altamaha River in Georgia to Edisto Beach, South Carolina. Simultaneously, a hurricane watch was posted from Edisto Beach to Surf City in North Carolina. The hurricane watch was extended further north to Ocracoke Inlet, North Carolina, at 15:00 UTC on September 4. Three hours later, a tropical storm warning became in effect from the mouth of the Savannah River in Georgia to the North Carolina–Virginia state line, which included Albemarle and Pamlico sounds; the hurricane watch was extended to the Currituck Beach Light in North Carolina. Also at 21:00 UTC on September 4, a tropical storm watch was issued from the North Carolina–Virginia state line to the Great Egg Harbor Bay in New Jersey and included the tidal portions of the Potomac River as well as Chesapeake Bay, Washington, D.C., and Delaware Bay. On September 5 at 09:00 UTC, the tropical storm warning in effect from the mouth of the Altamaha River to the Currituck Beach Light was extended northward to Chincoteague, Virginia and included a portion of Chesapeake Bay.

The tropical storm watch from the North Carolina–Virginia state line to Great Egg Harbor was northward extended to Sandy Hook, New Jersey, while the portion south of Chincoteague was discontinued at 0:900 UTC on September 5. That tropical storm watch was upgraded to a tropical storm warning at 15:00 UTC on September 5. Simultaneously, the tropical storm watch issued at 09:00 UTC was extended further north to Watch Hill, Rhode Island. Around 21:00 UTC on September 5, the tropical storm watch, which stretched from Sandy Hook to Watch Hill, was again expanded to the mouth of the Merrimack River in Massachusetts. Early the next day, the tropical storm warning south of Edisto Beach was discontinued, while the hurricane watch south of the mouth of the Santee River in South Carolina was also canceled. At 03:00 UTC on September 6, a portion of the tropical storm watch from Sandy Hook to Watch Hill was upgraded to a tropical storm warning and further to the Merrimack River about six hours later. Thereafter, the tropical cyclone warnings and watches were gradually discontinued, until none remained at 09:00 UTC on September 7.

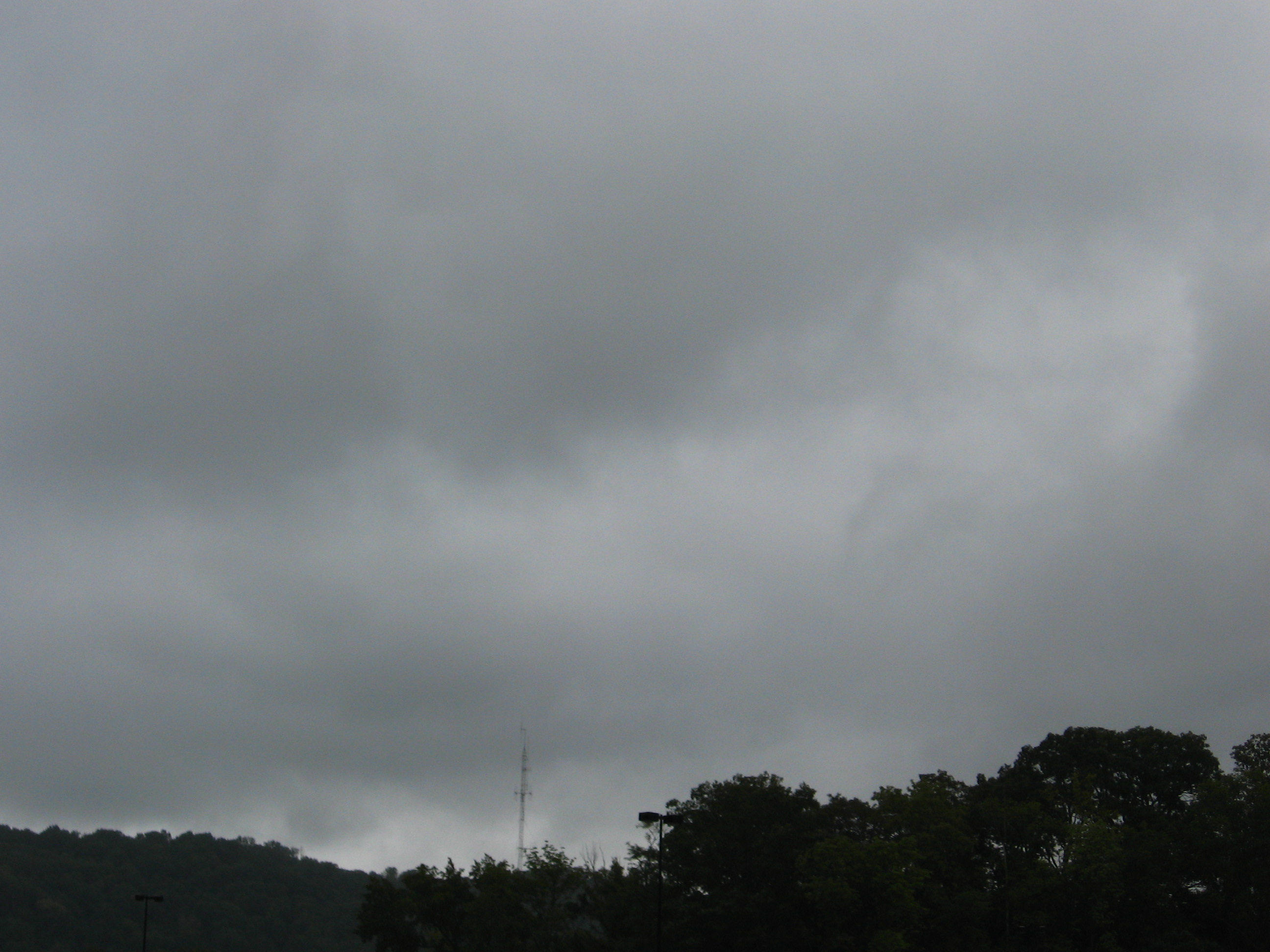
Hanna caused rainfall as far inland as Huntington, West Virginia

From Florida to New York, Amtrak canceled some train routes that run through the southeast United States. In Florida, Governor Charlie Crist declared a state of emergency as Hanna initially appeared to be a threat. Governor Crist declined to attend the Republican National Convention in Saint Paul, Minnesota and remarked that, "We've got a lot coming at us, and I think it's important to be here ... I haven't been in communication with anyone at the RNC ... Our focus needs to stay on these storms." The National Aeronautics and Space Administration (NASA) also announced that the movement of the Space Shuttle Atlantis to the launchpad for Flight STS-125 from the Kennedy Space Center would be pushed up a day due to the threat of Hanna.

On September 5, rural water associations in the Carolinas and neighboring states prepared staff and equipment to respond to emergencies. Associations activated their mutual aid networks, preparing for the landfall of Hanna and Hurricane Ike while still providing assistance to areas impacted by Hurricane Gustav. In Wilmington, North Carolina, the University of North Carolina at Wilmington canceled all classes and activities for Friday, September 5, and Saturday, September 6, in preparation for the storm, and issued an advised voluntary evacuation. UNCW officially closed at noon on Friday, and reopened at noon on Saturday, after the storm had passed. Specifically Wagoner Dining Hall, Randall Library, and the Student Recreation Center were reopened to students. Classes resumed regular schedules on Monday, September 8.

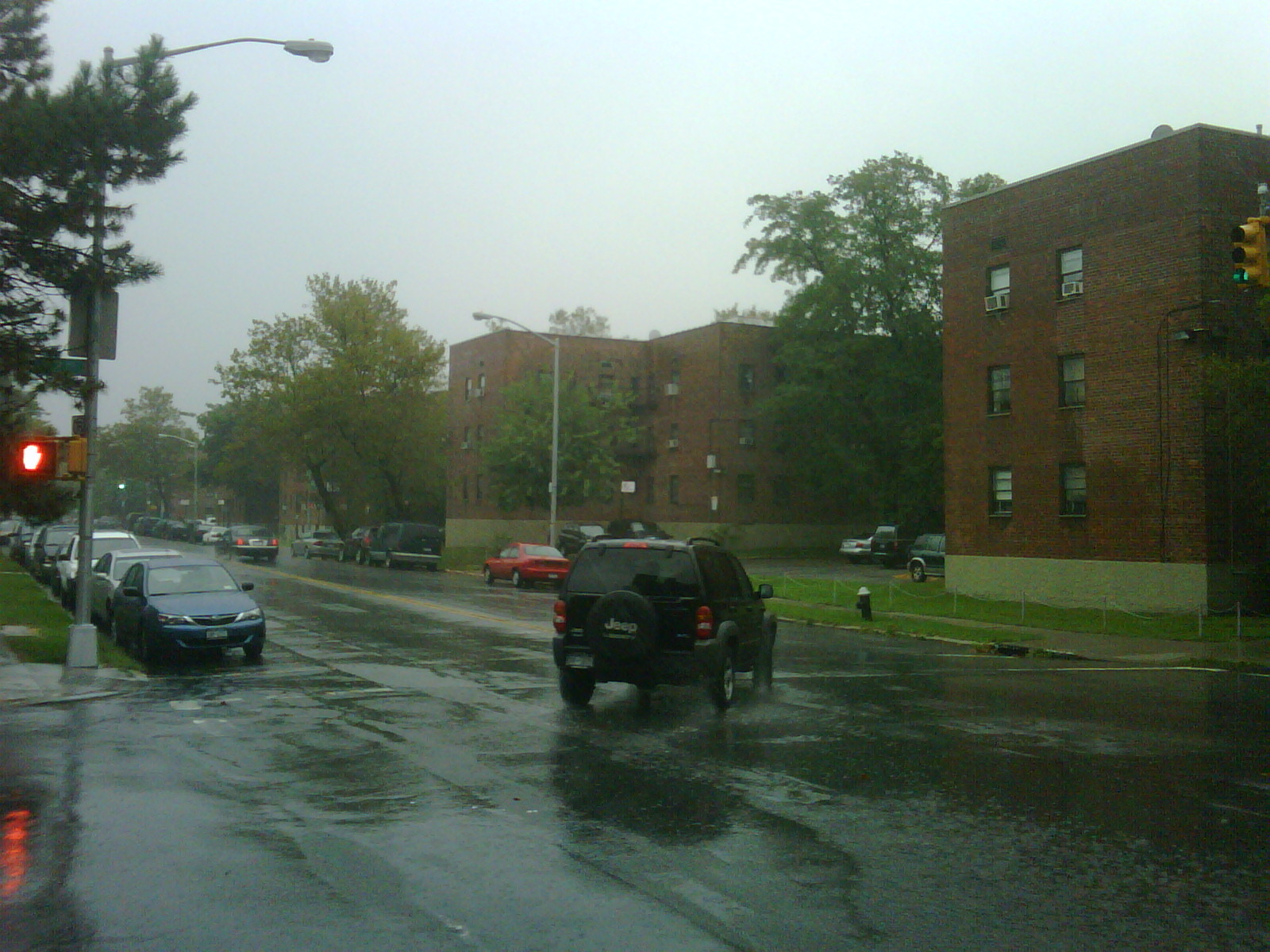
Hanna's effects in New York City

Christopher Newport University in Newport News, Virginia, canceled all class and activities on Friday and Saturday and issued a mandatory evacuation due to fears of a power outage. The College of William & Mary and Old Dominion University nearby had not made any similar plans. Old Dominion University and nearby neighboring school Norfolk State University did cancel classes for both Friday afternoon, and Saturday, due to the possibilities of heavy rain and wind. Two other Hampton Roads schools, Regent University and Virginia Wesleyan College, did not close on Friday, but Regent closed completely on Saturday, while Virginia Wesleyan canceled classes on Saturday but otherwise remained open.

On Friday, September 5, NASCAR announced that they would postpone the NASCAR Nationwide Series Emerson Radio 250 (scheduled to be run that evening) and the next day's NASCAR Sprint Cup Series Chevy Rock and Roll 400 until Sunday afternoon after Hanna had moved north of Virginia. Both races were held at the Richmond International Raceway in Henrico County, Virginia. With a delay in the storm during the day on September 6, the US Open tennis tournament went on, but was eventually canceled as the rains came. Nearby at Shea Stadium, the baseball game between the New York Mets and Philadelphia Phillies was cancelled in advance of the storm, rescheduled as a day-night doubleheader on September 7. The game between the Baltimore Orioles and Oakland Athletics was cancelled due to the storm.

Power companies on Long Island were preparing for a minimal hurricane and the first real test of New York's readiness for a strong storm impacting the region. In Nassau County, phone calls were attempted to volunteer fire departments, but simultaneously calls were being made to 193,000 residences about the West Nile virus, slowing down phone connections. Over 800 workers were on standby in case anything were to happen due to the storm.

In Canada, the Emergency Measures Organization of the Canadian province of New Brunswick issued a warning on September 5 to expect "significant rainfall" and "localized flooding" on September 7 and September 8.

== Impact ==
Deaths by country
Haiti	529
Dominican Republic	1
United States	7
Total	537

The storm brought heavy rainfall and flooding throughout its path. Particularly hard hit was Haiti, as the ground was already saturated by Tropical Storm Fay and Hurricane Gustav. A deadly flooding event ensued, with 529 fatalities confirmed, most of which were in the Gonaïves area. One person drowned in the neighboring country of Dominican Republic. Mostly minor damage occurred in the Bahamas. Along the coast of the Southeastern United States, three people drowned offshore Florida due to rip currents. Several states along the East Coast of the United States from South Carolina to Maine reported flooding. Throughout the country, there were seven deaths and approximately $160 million in damage.

=== U.S. Virgin Islands and Puerto Rico ===
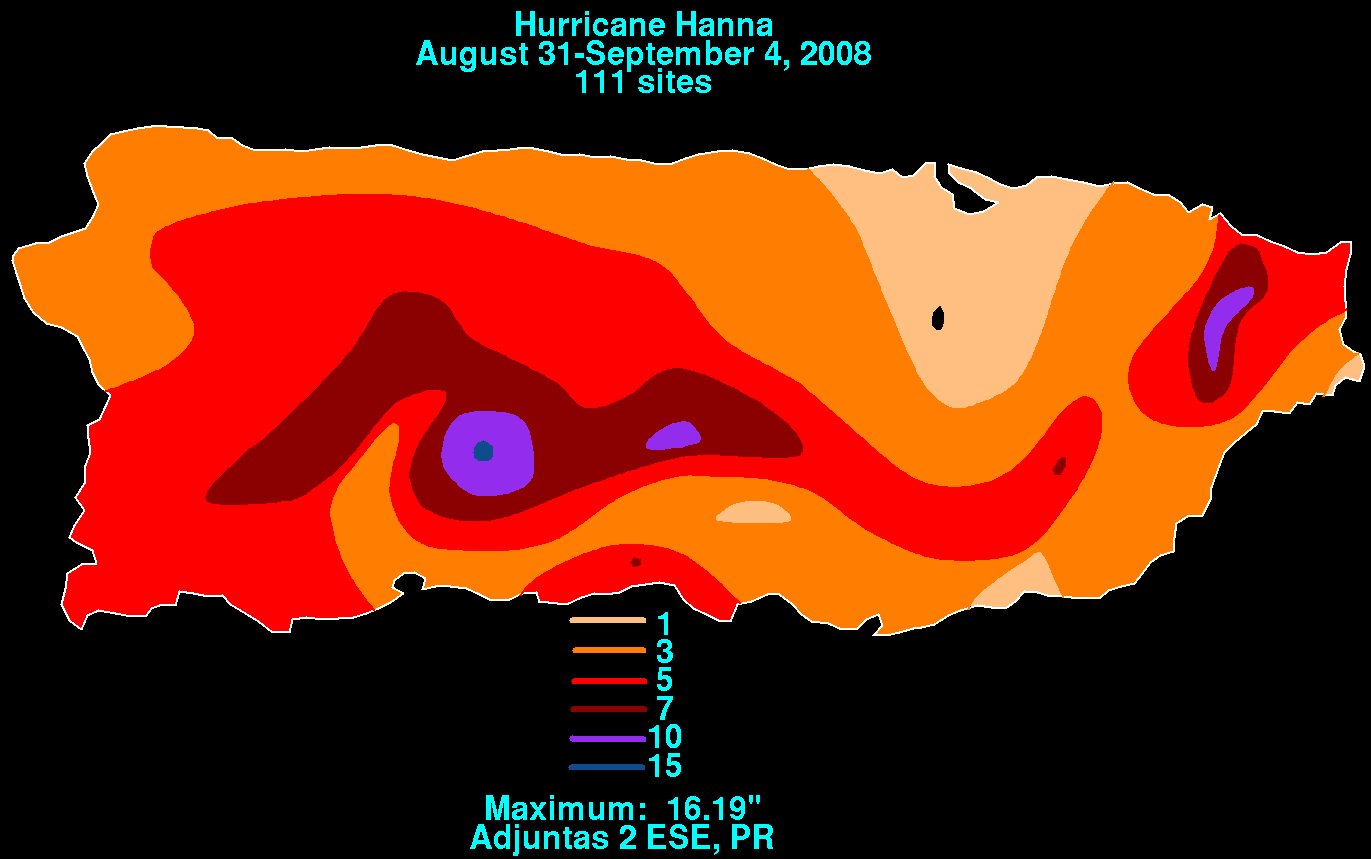
Rainfall from Hanna over Puerto Rico

In the United States Virgin Islands, the outer bands of Hanna dropped locally heavy rainfall on some islands, particularly at the Cyril E. King Airport on Saint Thomas. Additionally, a National Weather Service observed reported 1.7 inches (43 mm) of precipitation over a 24-hour period.

Some areas of northeastern Puerto Rico observed 10–12 inches (250–300 mm) of rain in only 24 hours. As a result, many rivers exceeded their banks and several mudslides were reported. A number of streets were inundated and later closed. The Westin Rio Mar Golf Club course in Río Grande was also flooded. On the western side of the island in Añasco, residents fled their homes for shelters.

=== The Bahamas ===
Widespread rain and strong winds were reported in the Bahamas and Turks and Caicos Islands as a result of Hanna. Only relatively minor damage and no fatalities were reported in either area. However, damage assessments were limited to the passage of Hurricane Ike less than a week later. Winds caused roof damage to some homes. Storm surge flooded the Providenciales and Five Cays. Many roads were inundated and suffered damage, including to a recently completed causeway linking North and Middle Caicos Islands. There were also reports of boats in and near the Caicos Islands that were washed ashore or sunk during the storm.

=== Hispaniola ===
Haiti, already rain-saturated by Fay and Gustav, was hit hard by flooding and mudslides from several days of heavy rainfall, particularly in the city of Gonaïves which also suffered catastrophic damage in 2004 from Hurricane Jeanne. Nearly the entire city was flooded with water as high as 2 meters (6.6 feet) deep, and some people had to be rescued on their roofs. In Les Cayes, a hospital had to be evacuated as it was swamped by flood water. At least 5,000 people there were moved to public shelters due to the flooding. The United Nations have ordered relief convoys to the hard-hit region, including rafts to help rescue victims. As of late on September 4, Haiti's government said the death toll from Tropical Storm Hanna had increased to at least 529, with most of the deaths coming in the flooded port city of Gonaïves, where the destruction was described as "catastrophic" and 495 bodies were discovered as of late on September 5. Haitian authorities said the tally could grow once officials are able to make their way through Gonaïves. "The assessment is only partial, because it is impossible to enter the city for the moment", Gonaïves Mayor Stephen Moise said. In the aftermath of Hanna at least 48,000 from the Gonaïves areas went to shelters. Some people slept on the roofs of their house to protect them from looters. The catastrophe left many homeless and begging for food and clothes. Others left for the mountains hoping to wait out the next storms on the horizon. Haitians became aggravated at the lack of assistance in the wake of Hanna, with very little aid coming from international organizations. Bridges north and south of Gonaïves collapsed, with roads in the vicinity of the area transformed into swamps.

Over a week after Hanna brushed the Dominican Republic, the body of a fisherman who drowned in the storm was found in the Atlantic just off the northern coast.

=== United States ===
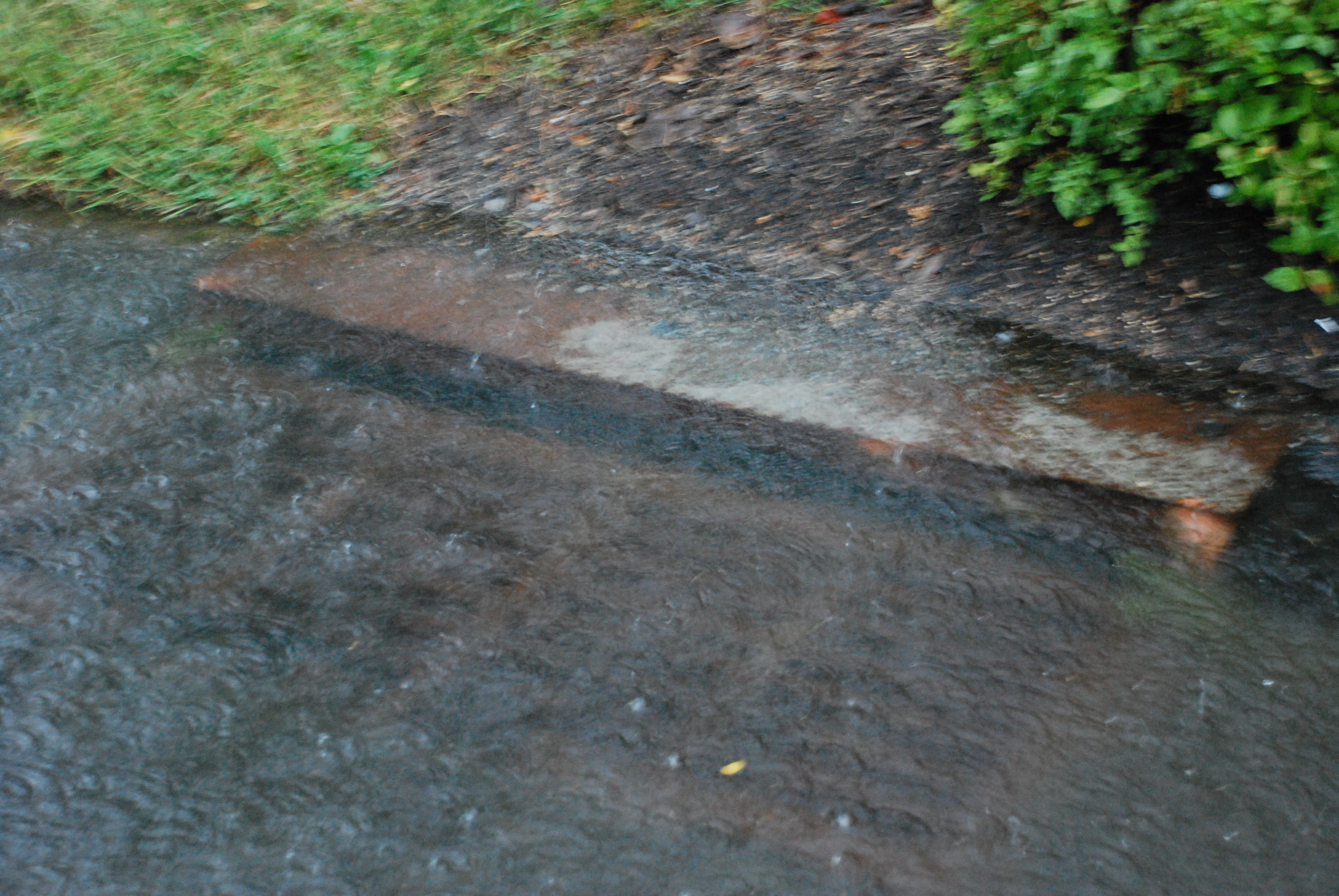
Minor street flooding in Westchester County, New York

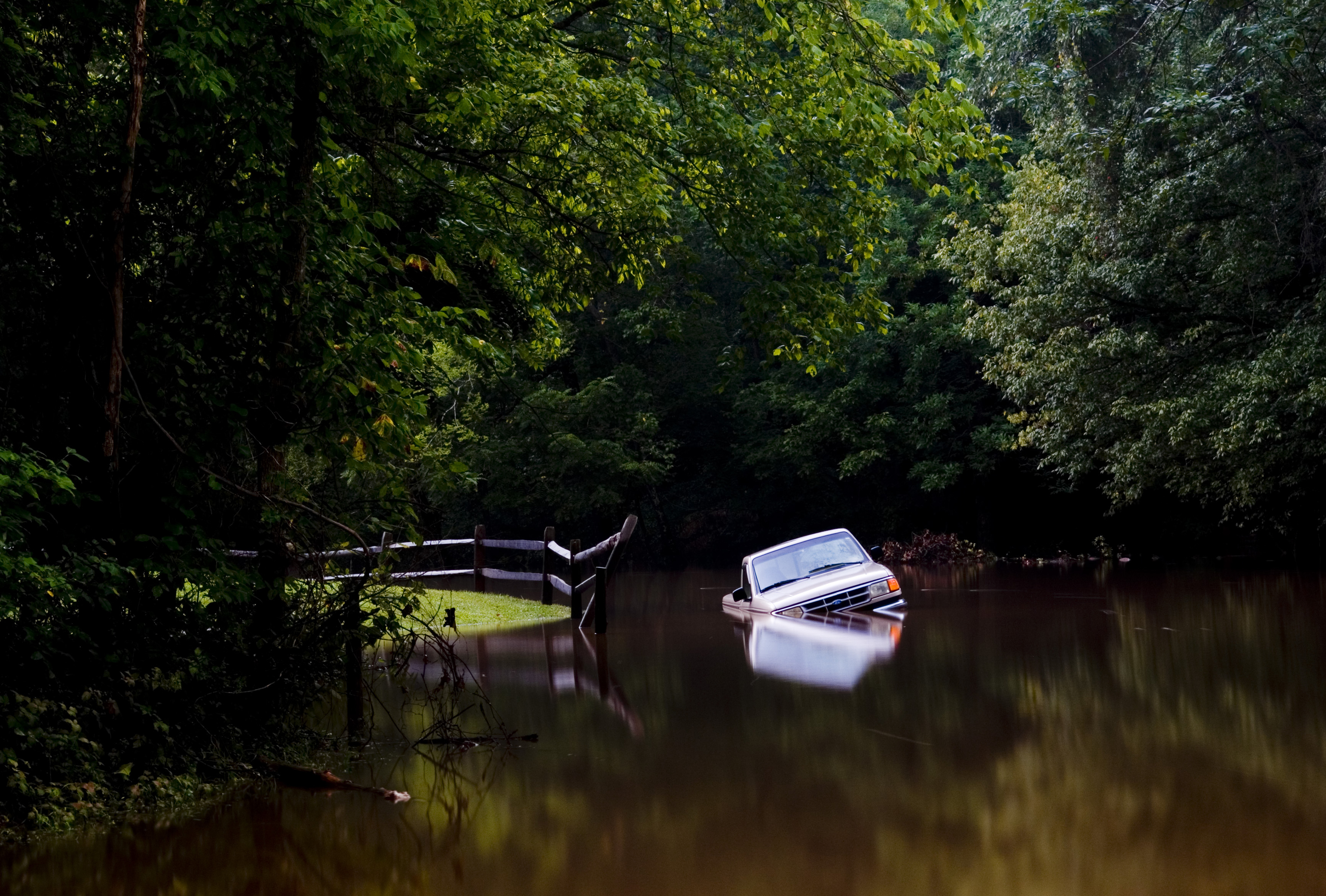
Flood damage in Eno River State Park, North Carolina

While in the Atlantic near the Bahamas, high surf and rip currents were produced by Hanna off the Southeast U.S. coast. A 14-year-old boy drowned at John U. Lloyd Beach State Park near Hollywood, Florida, as a result of the rip currents brought up by the distant Hanna. Two more deaths were reported off the coast of Fort Lauderdale, Florida, as they drowned in the high seas. Because of the threat of a medium-term impact on the state and anticipated track of the storm, the governors of Florida, Virginia, North Carolina, and Maryland declared a state of emergency for their states and commonwealth. Washington, D.C., along with numerous other state and municipalities activated their Emergency Operations Centers in preparation for the storm. Hanna may have also spawned tornado(s) near Greenville, North Carolina and Allentown, Pennsylvania. After landfall in the Carolinas, Hanna was at its strongest when its center was just south of New York City at 11 pm EDT on September 6, when 60 mph (95 km/h) winds were recorded at the center; however, because most winds past the center were more gusty than sustained, most damage in the area was related to the rain. A 38-year-old man drowned due to rip currents in New Jersey as Hanna approached. Hanna knocked out power to about 32,000 people on Long Island as it quickly passed through on September 6. Hanna dumped 3.26 inches (83 mm) of rain in Central Park and 1.86 inches (47 mm) of Boston. Most of Acadia National Park closed after the storm dropped 5.24 inches (133 mm) of rain in Mount Desert Island and 7.59 inches (193 mm) of rain in Schoodic.

== See also ==
- List of Delaware hurricanes
- List of Florida hurricanes (2000–present)
- List of New England hurricanes
- List of New Jersey hurricanes
- Other storms of the same name
- Timeline of the 2008 Atlantic hurricane season
