= Tropical Storm Hanna (2002) =

Atlantic tropical storm

- Tropical Storm Hanna near peak intensity on September 13

Meteorological history
- Formed: September 12, 2002
- Dissipated: September 15, 2002

Tropical storm
- 1-minute sustained (SSHWS/NWS)
- Highest winds: 60 mph (95 km/h)
- Lowest pressure: 1001 mbar (hPa); 29.56 inHg

Overall effects
- Fatalities: 3 direct
- Damage: $20 million (2002 USD)
- Areas affected: Florida, Louisiana, Alabama, Mississippi, Georgia, Southeast U.S., Mid-Atlantic
- IBTrACS
- Part of the 2002 Atlantic hurricane season

Tropical Storm Hanna was a moderately strong tropical storm that affected the Gulf Coast and Southeastern regions of the United States. The ninth tropical cyclone and eighth named storm of the 2002 Atlantic hurricane season, Hanna formed over the Gulf of Mexico through the complex interaction of a surface trough, a tropical wave, and an upper-level low pressure system, a disturbance in the upper atmosphere. Designated a tropical depression at 0000 UTC on September 12, the storm remained disorganized throughout its duration, though it attained tropical storm status and a peak intensity of 1,001 mbar (29.6 inHg), with winds of 60 miles per hour (100 km/h). Hanna crossed extreme southeastern Louisiana, and made a second landfall along the Alabama–Mississippi border.

Because most of the associated convective activity was east of the center of circulation, Louisiana and Mississippi received minimal damage. However, on Dauphin Island, Alabama, the storm caused coastal flooding which closed roads and forced the evacuation of residents. Florida received high wind gusts, heavy rainfall, and strong surf that resulted in the deaths of three swimmers. 20,000 homes in the state lost electricity. The heavy rainfall progressed into Georgia, where significant flooding occurred. Crop damage was extensive, and about 335 structures were damaged by the flooding. The storm caused a total of about $20 million in damage (equivalent to $36 million in 2025).

== Meteorological history ==
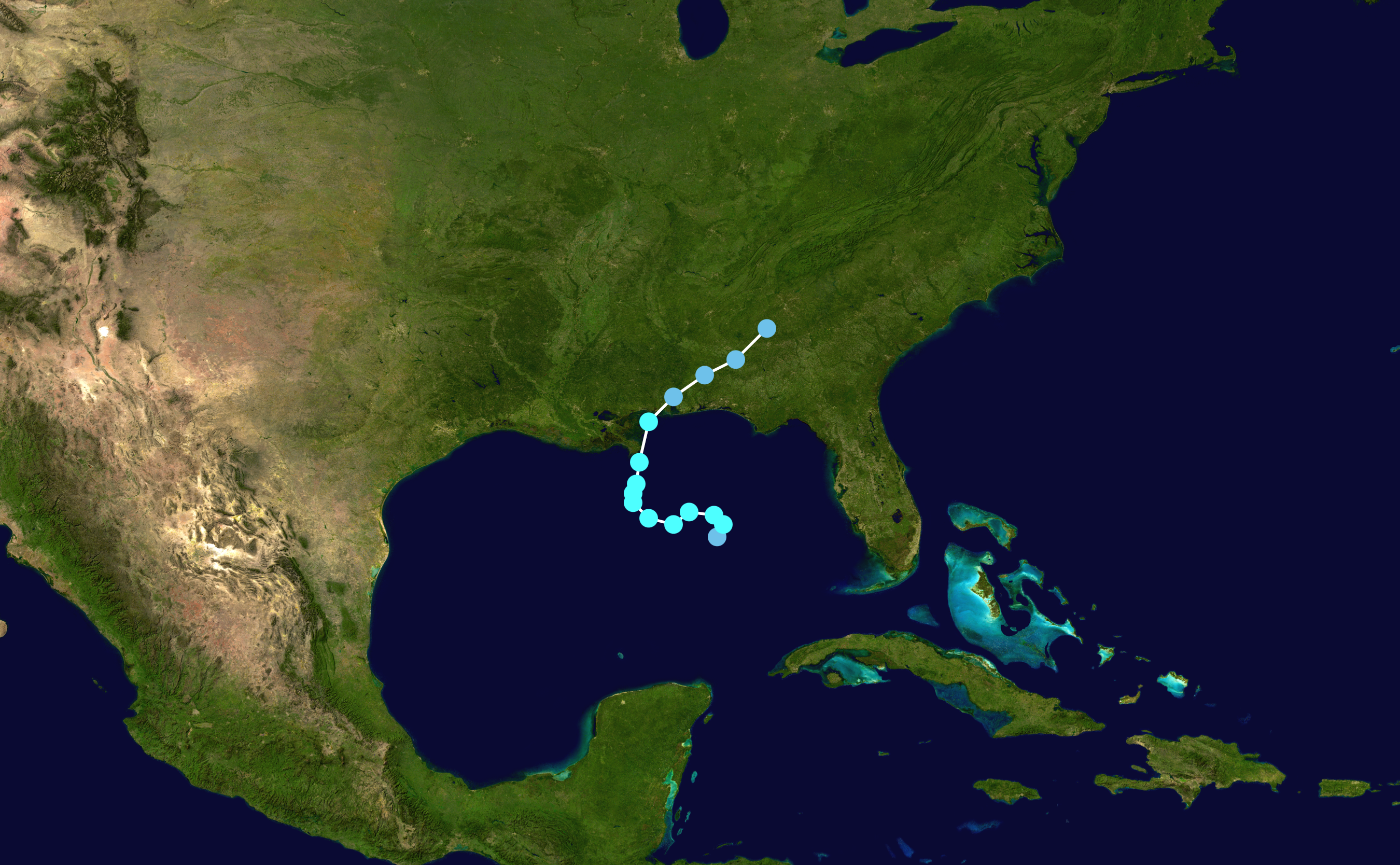
Map plotting the storm's track and intensity, according to the Saffir–Simpson scale Map key Saffir–Simpson scale Tropical depression (≤38 mph, ≤62 km/h) Tropical storm (39–73 mph, 63–118 km/h) Category 1 (74–95 mph, 119–153 km/h) Category 2 (96–110 mph, 154–177 km/h) Category 3 (111–129 mph, 178–208 km/h) Category 4 (130–156 mph, 209–251 km/h) Category 5 (≥157 mph, ≥252 km/h) Unknown Storm type Tropical cyclone Subtropical cyclone Extratropical cyclone, remnant low, tropical disturbance, or monsoon depression

A broad surface trough extended from the western Atlantic Ocean into the Gulf of Mexico in early September 2002. At the same time, a westward-moving tropical wave entered the gulf on September 10 and spawned a weak low along the trough, with little associated thunderstorm activity. On September 11, an upper-level low over the United States moved into the Gulf and became cut off from the flow, allowing atmospheric convection to develop to the east of the tropical wave. The surface low organized, and convection formed closer to the center of the low. At 0000 UTC on September 12, a Hurricane Hunters aircraft was able to find a well-defined center of circulation; the National Hurricane Center (NHC) thus designated it a tropical depression while it was about 280 miles (450 km) south of Pensacola, Florida.

After being designated, the cyclone became disorganized, and contained little deep and persistent convection; with dry air infringing on the western edge of the storm, substantial intensification was deemed unlikely. Despite being sheared, the cyclone neared tropical storm status later that day, though it remained a depression due to a partially non-tropical appearance. Initially, the depression meandered towards the northeast due to weak steering currents, and it intensified into a tropical storm at 0600 UTC. As such, it was named Hanna by the National Hurricane Center. Over the next 24 hours, the low-level center rotated around the mid- and upper-level centers, and the entire tropical storm turned southwestward by late September 12. After a jog to the northwest, the low-level center became separated from the convection. Meandering, the storm started to turn northward under the steering currents of a southwesterly flow associated with an approaching mid-level trough. Hanna then strengthened sharply to reach to its peak intensity of 60 miles per hour (100 km/h) at 0000 UTC on September 14.

Convection shifted towards the eastern semicircle of the circulation, while the still-exposed center became malformed and elongated. On September 14, the poorly organized cyclone crossed southeastern Louisiana, turned towards the north-northeast and made a second landfall close to the Alabama–Mississippi border at 1500 UTC that day, still at its peak strength. The storm dissipated rapidly as it proceeded inland, and the remnant low pressure area moved into Georgia and South Carolina.

== Preparations ==
The precursor to Tropical Storm Hanna on September 11

Shortly after the formation of the storm, the National Hurricane Center issued a tropical storm watch for the coastal area between Pascagoula, Mississippi and the Suwannee River in Florida. A tropical storm warning for the region between Grand Isle, Louisiana and Apalachicola, Florida replaced the watch, though it was discontinued east of Apalachicola. All tropical cyclone warnings and watches were discontinued by 1800 UTC on September 14, as there was no longer a need for the advisories. After the landfall, officials issued flood watches for inland parts of Mississippi and Alabama as well as for western portions of Georgia and the Carolinas. On Dauphin Island in Alabama, some residents boarded up windows and filled sandbags provided by local fire departments to prepare for Hanna. The Red Cross opened 10 shelters throughout the Gulf Coast region.

== Impact ==
The total damage caused by Tropical Storm Hanna amounted to about $20 million—equivalent to $36 million in 2025.

=== U.S. Gulf Coast ===
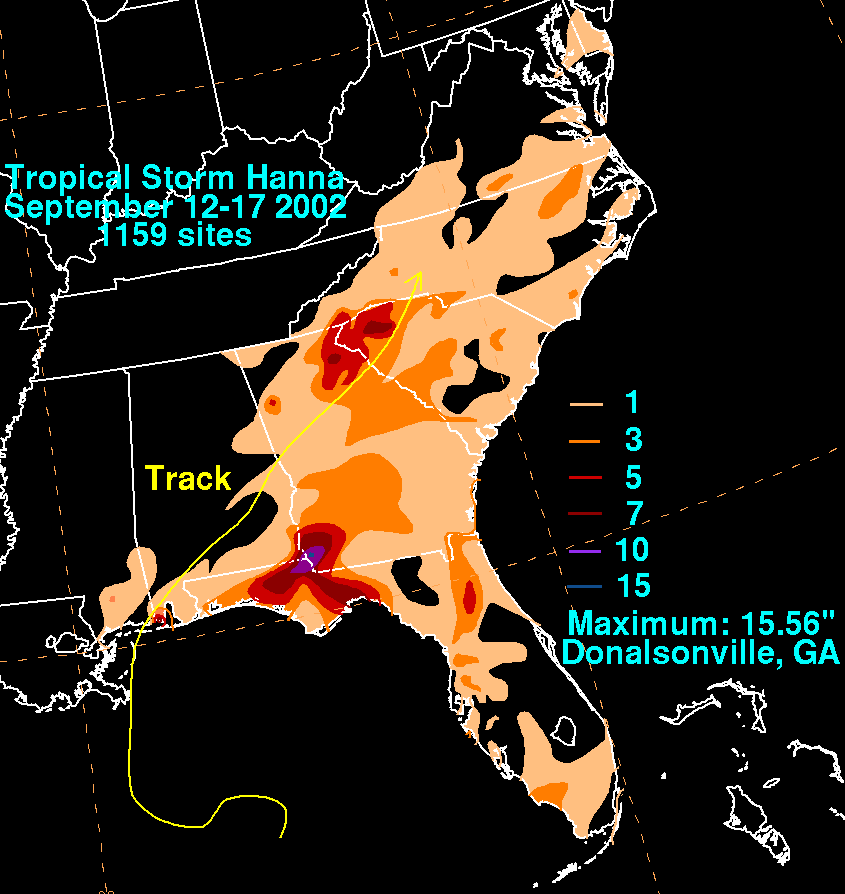
Rainfall totals

In Louisiana, damage was light, as the majority of Hanna's convective activity was to the east. Rainfall was mostly less than 1 inches (25 mm), and little rise in tide was reported. Little or no damage occurred in neighboring Mississippi, where similar effects were reported.

Damage was greater in Alabama, where rain reached 7.55 inches (192 mm) at Coden and 5.75 inches (146 mm) at Belle Fontaine. Sustained winds of 40 miles per hour (64 km/h) were reported at Dauphin Island, with gusts up to 51 mph (82 km/h). The lowest barometric pressure was also at Dauphin Island; it reportedly fell to 1005 mb. Storm tides of 3.7 feet (1.1 m) caused minor coastal flooding and beach erosion in some areas, including along the causeway that crosses the Mobile Bay. One tornado, an F0 on the Fujita Scale, touched down in south Mobile County, knocking down trees. Some residents were left without electric power, and there was flooding on both ends of Dauphin Island, leading to road closures. The storm forced the evacuation of some residents on the western end of the island. In addition to the heavy rains, trees were downed in parts of Baldwin County.

In Florida, peak gusts were recorded at 68 miles per hour (109 km/h) near Pensacola Beach. The winds, combined with associated thunderstorms, caused minor damage, and brought down small trees and power lines. Throughout Walton County, Hanna left approximately 15,000 customers without power, forming a statewide total of 20,000 power outages. Due to high winds, bridges to offshore islands were closed. Minor beach erosion was reported along the coast of Walton, Bay and Gulf counties. Three people drowned in high surf; one near Pensacola Beach, one at Seagrove Beach and another at Panama City Beach. The fatalities prompted a local Police Major to comment, "People are getting into the water and not paying attention to the warning flags." Heavy rain fell throughout the central and western Panhandle; the highest reported total was 9.68 inches (246 mm), at Chipley. As a result, rivers topped their banks, while county roads and homes in Perry, as well as streets in the Tallahassee region, were flooded. The total damage in Florida is estimated at $400,000 (equivalent to $700,000 in 2025).

=== Eastern United States ===
Hanna dropped heavy rainfall across much of Georgia, peaking at 15.56 inches (395 mm) at Donalsonville, 12.47 inches (317 mm) at Carrollton, and 11.23 in (285 mm) at Embry. Although the heaviest rainfall was mostly confined to southwestern parts of the state, precipitation was widespread within a northwest–northeast feeder band over central and northern Georgia. Associated with the band was up to 2 inches (51 mm) of rainfall in a matter of hours, as well as gusty thunderstorms. The highest rainfall totals from this individual band were limited to an area north of a line from Atlanta to Athens. The heavy rainfall helped to relieve a persistent drought, bringing vegetation back to life. However, climatologists determined that the rainfall did not fully alleviate the dry conditions. The band of thunderstorms produced gusts of 40 to 50 mph (64 to 80 km/h), downing trees and power lines. In the Atlanta metropolitan area, 48,000 customers received power outages. The winds tore a roof off a house and damaged a number of mobile homes. The heavy rainfall caused severe flooding; in Donalsonville, 250 houses and 50 businesses suffered water damage, while another 35 were damaged in nearby Miller County. Roads were flooded, including parts of U.S. Route 27. Crop damage was significant in the state. According to the Georgia Farm Services Agency, $19 million in damage (equivalent to $34 million in 2025) to cotton and peanut crops were reported. Due to the flooding and damage, Governor Roy Barnes declared Seminole, Miller and Decatur counties federal disaster areas.

Moderate to heavy rain extended as far north as the Carolinas, and light showers reached the Delmarva Peninsula. Locations in western South Carolina picked up around 3 inches (75 mm) of rainfall, causing flooding on some roads and highways. Various streams and ponds topped their banks, and flood waters on some roads reached an estimated 4 to 6 inches (100 to 150 mm) deep. On South Carolina Highway 20, a motorist became stranded in high waters, and nearby houses were damaged. The rainfall delayed a football game at Williams-Brice Stadium for about 50 minutes. Farther northward, the remnants of Tropical Storm Hanna contributed to around 1 inch (25 mm) of rainfall in New England, particularly in Vermont.

== See also ==
- List of storms named Hanna
- Tropical Storm Debby (2012)
- Tropical cyclone
- List of Florida hurricanes
