= Hennah =

Hennah is a surname. Notable people with the surname include:

- Dan Hennah, New Zealand production designer
- Walter Hennah (1880–1946), Australian cricketer
- William Hennah (1768–1832), British naval officer

== See also ==
- Hannah (name)
- Henna (name)
