= Tom (1792 ship) =

History

Great Britain
- Name: Tom
- Launched: 1780, America
- Acquired: 1792
- Captured: 1794

General characteristics
- Tons burthen: 143 (bm)
- Complement: 1793: 35; 1794: 18
- Armament: 1793: 10 × 4-pounder guns + 2 swivel guns; 1794: 12 × 4-pounder guns

Tom (or Toms) was launched in 1780 in America, possibly under another name. She first appeared in British records in 1792. From 1792, Tom participated as a slave ship in the triangular trade in enslaved people. She made two complete voyages from Liverpool. French frigates captured her in 1794, while she was on her third voyage, but before she could acquire any captives.

== Career ==
Toms first appeared in Lloyd's Register (LR) in the volume for 1792.

Year	Master	Owner	Trade	Source & notes
1792	Jn.Brine	T.Lyland	Liverpool–Africa	LR; new deck, raised and large repair 1792

1st voyage transporting enslaved people (1792): Captain Brine sailed from Liverpool on 13 April 1792. Tom started acquiring captives at the Congo River on 9 August, and sailed from there on 10 September. Toms arrived at Grenada on 6 November, with Maxwell, master. Tom had embarked 239 captives and she arrived with 233, for a 3% mortality rate. She arrived back at Liverpool on 25 December. She had left Liverpool with 26 crew members and suffered one crew death on her voyage.

After the passage of Dolben's Act in 1788, masters received a bonus of £100 for a mortality rate of under 2%; the ship's surgeon received £50. For a mortality rate between two and three per cent, the bonus was halved. There was no bonus if mortality exceeded 3%. (Note: At the time the monthly wage for a captain of a slave ship out of Bristol was £5 per month.)

2nd voyage transporting enslaved people (1793–1794): Captain Brine sailed from Liverpool on 23 January 1793. War with France began just after Tom left on her second slave trading voyage. Captain John Brine was issued a letter of marque on 28 February 1793. Lloyd's List reported in March that Tom, Brine, master, had been sailing from Liverpool to Africa when she was driven on shore at Hoylake. She was got off and returned into dock to repair some damage.

Tom began acquiring captives at the Congo River 28 June. She left Africa on 3 September and arrived at St Croix on 23 November. She had embarked 236 captives and she arrived with 216 for an 8% mortality rate. She sailed for Liverpool on 10 January 1794, and arrived there on 22 February. She had left Liverpool with 31 crew members and she had suffered 16 crew deaths on her voyage.

At the time Saint Croix was a Danish colony. In 1792, the Danish government passed a law that would outlaw Danish participation in the trans-Atlantic enslaving trade, from early 1803 on. This led the government in the Danish West Indies to encourage the importation of captives prior to the ban taking effect. One measure that it took was to open the trade to foreign vessels. Records for the period 1796 to 1799 show that 24 British enslaving ships, most of them from Liverpool, arrived at St Croix and imported 6,781 captives.

Third voyage transporting enslaved people (1794-Loss): Captain James Galt acquired a letter of marque on 10 March 1794. He sailed from Liverpool on 26 March 1794.

== Fate ==
In July 1794 Lloyd's List reported that two French frigates had captured at least four British vessels off Madeira. Two, Tom, Galt, master, and Hannah, Stringen, master, were on their way to Africa. Forty-six people, part of the crews of the four vessels, were landed at Madeira.

In 1794, 25 British vessels in the triangular trade were lost, 25 of them on their way to Africa. During the period 1793 to 1807, war, not maritime hazards nor slave resistance, was the greatest cause of vessel losses among British slave vessels.
