= List of storms named Hortense =

The name Hortense has been used for five tropical cyclones worldwide: three in the Atlantic Ocean and one each in the South Pacific Ocean and the South-West Indian Ocean.

- Hurricane Hortense (1984) - meandered over Bermuda as a tropical storm, causing no reported damage.
- Tropical Storm Hortense (1990) - disrupted by interaction with Hurricane Gustav.
- Hurricane Hortense (1996) - damaging and deadly cyclone that passed over Guadeloupe and Puerto Rico, and grazed the eastern Dominican Republic and the Turks and Caicos Islands.

The name Hortense was retired in the Atlantic Basin after the 1996 season, and was replaced by Hanna in the 2002 season.

In the South Pacific Ocean:

- Cyclone Hortense (1969) – tropical cyclone that passed through and affected Fiji and Vanuatu.

In the South-West Indian Ocean:

- Tropical Storm Hortense (1973) – a powerful tropical storm passed south of Reunion, bringing rain to the island after hitting Madagascar.
