= No Relief =

Single by Hannah
- Released: April 2002
- Recorded: Sydney
- Genre: Pop

Hannah singles chronology
"No Relief" (2002)	"Stop n Think" (2002)

"No Relief" is song and the debut single by Australian singer, Hannah. The song was released in April 2002 and peaked at number 18 on the ARIA charts.

The single was launched in April at M Restaurant.

== Track listings ==
CD single (Vibe Music Australia – VMA-H01)

1. "No Relief"
2. "No Relief" (Dance Mix)
3. "No Relief" (R & B Mix)
4. "Love Make the World Go Round"

== Charts ==
Chart (2002)	Peak position
Australia (ARIA Charts)	18
