= Abu Hena =

Abu Hena (Bengali: আবু হেনা) is a Bengali Muslim given name and alias of Arabic origin. It may refer to:

- Abu Hena Bagmari (1939–2020), member of the Bangladesh Parliament
- Abu Hena Mohammad Mustafa Lotus Kamal (born 1947), former Finance Minister of Bangladesh
- Abu Hena (Indian politician) (1950–2025), Cabinet Minister of West Bengal
- Abu Hena Md. Rahmatul Muneem (born 1961), chairman of the National Board of Revenue, Bangladesh
- Abu Hena Saiful Islam (born 1963), Bangladeshi-American naval officer
- Abu Hena Morshed Zaman, Bangladeshi civil servant and former director of Central Medical Store Depot
- Abu Hena Mohammad Razee Hassan, head of Bangladesh Financial Intelligence Unit
- Mohammad Abu Hena (born 1937), commissioner of the Bangladesh Scouts and chairman of Asia-Pacific Scouts
- Abu Hena Rony (born 1987), Bangladeshi standup comedian
- Abu Hena Bablu, Bangladeshi cinematographer
