= Stop n Think =

Single by Hannah
- Released: November 2002
- Recorded: Sydney
- Genre: Pop

Hannah singles chronology
"No Relief" (2002)	"Stop n Think" (2002)

"Stop n Think" is a pop song by Australian singer Hannah. The song was released in November 2002 as Hannah's second and final single. It peaked at number 18 on the ARIA charts.

== Track listings ==
CD single (Vibe Music Australia – VMA-H02)

1. "Stop n Think"
2. "Stop n Think" (KCB Klubbmix)
3. "Stop n Think" (KCB Klubbmix Extended Version)
4. "Stop n Think" (Karaoke Mix)
5. "No Relief

== Charts ==
Chart (2002)	Peak position
Australia (ARIA Charts)	18
