= List of storms named Hina =

The name Hina has been used to name two tropical cyclones in the South Pacific Ocean and one in the South-West Indian Ocean.

In the South Pacific:

- Cyclone Hina (1985) – became a Category 5 severe tropical cyclone
- Cyclone Hina (1997) – considered the worst tropical cyclone to affect Tonga in 15 years

After the 1996–97 season, the name Hina was retired from future usage in the South Pacific.

In the South-West Indian Ocean:

- Tropical Storm Hina (2009) – did not affect land

== See also ==
- Cyclone Hikaa (2019) – a North Indian Ocean tropical cyclone with a similar name
- Typhoon Hinnamnor (2022) – a West Pacific tropical cyclone with a similar name
- Cyclone Mahina (1899) – an Australian region tropical cyclone with a similar name
- List of storms named Fina – a similar name that has also been used in the Australian region
- List of storms named Gina – a similar name that has been used in three tropical cyclone basins
