= Han-na =

- Hangul: 한나
- RR: Hanna
- MR: Hanna

Han-na is a Korean given name.

== List ==
- Han-na Chang (born 1982), South Korean conductor and cellist
- Gwon Han-na (born 1989), South Korean handball player
- Kang Han-na (born 1989), South Korean actress

== See also ==
- Hanna (disambiguation)
- Hannah (name)
