= Hana Rural District =

Hana Rural District (Persian: دهستان حنا) may refer to:

- Hana Rural District (Fars Province)
- Hana Rural District (Isfahan Province)
