= Abu Hena Mohammad Razee Hassan =

Abu Hena Mohammad Razee Hassan is a Bangladeshi bureaucrat and head of the Bangladesh Financial Intelligence Unit since 2012. He is a former deputy governor of Bangladesh Bank.

== Early life ==
Hasan completed his master's degree in economics from the University of Dhaka. He has a second master's in economics from Vanderbilt University.

== Career ==
Hassan joined Bangladesh Bank as an assistant director in 1981.

In 2012, Hasan was appointed the head of the Bangladesh Financial Intelligence Unit. He also served as the deputy governor of Bangladesh Bank till his term ended in September 2018.

Hassan was appointed the head of the Bangladesh Financial Intelligence Unit again in October 2018. He was made chief executive of the unit.

From July 2018 to July 2020, Hassan served as the co-chairperson of the Asia/Pacific Group on Money Laundering. Hassan was the chief guest at the conference of Branch Anti Money Laundering Compliance Officers of Social Islami Bank Limited in 2019. In September 2019, he opened a workshop on money laundering in collaboration with the ambassador of the United States to Bangladesh, Earl R. Miller. On 28 November 2019, he met with the secretary of the Asian Bankers Association, Ernest Lin, at Bangladesh Bank.

Hassan participated in a webinar titled E-commerce: Current Situation and Possibilities on 5 September along with Mustafa Jabbar. On 7 September 2021, the Ministry of Finance created a five-member team to look for a replacement for Hassan, who is set to retire as the head of the Bangladesh Financial Intelligence Unit on 9 September.
