= Hannah (Austrian singer) =

Austrian singer

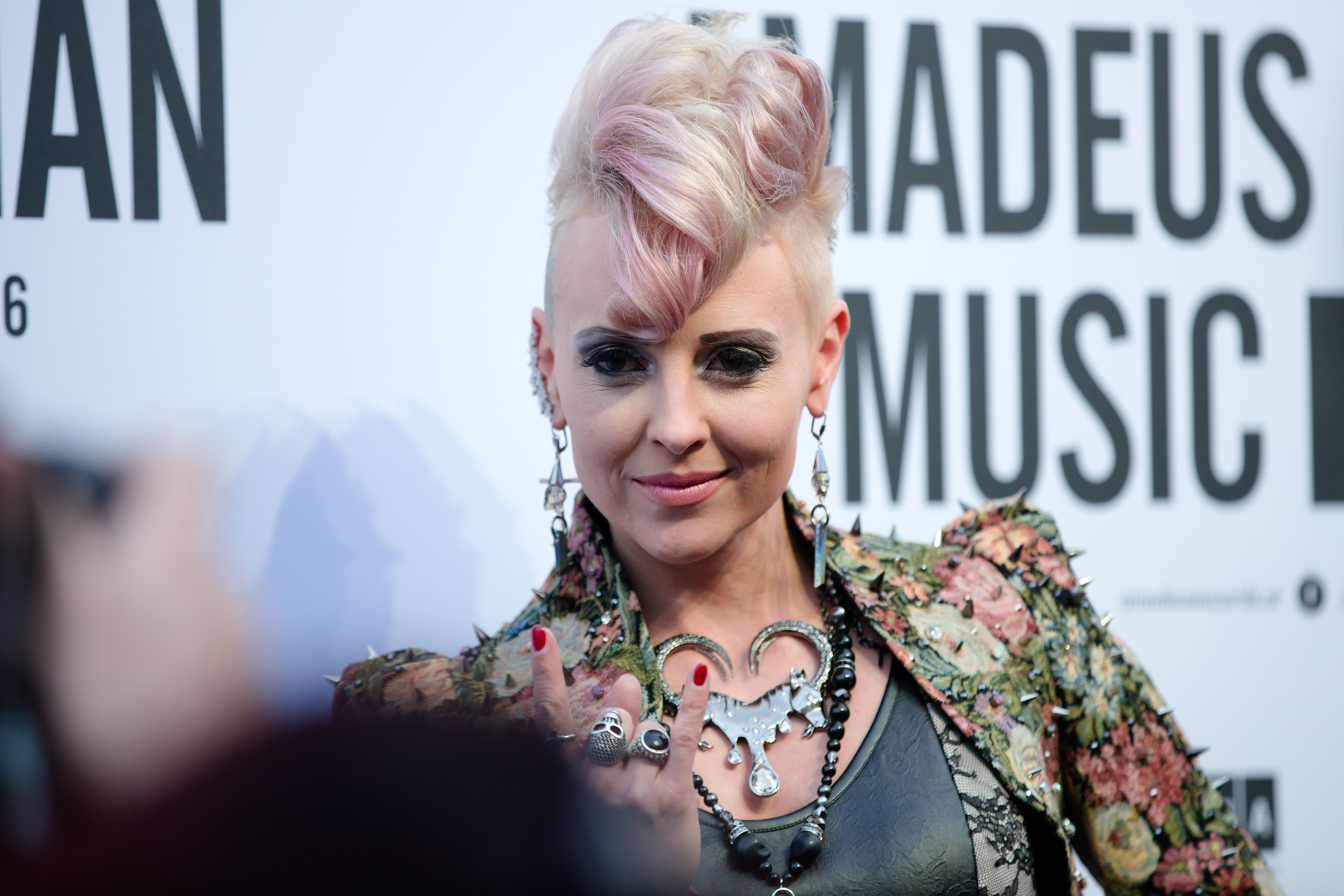
Hannah (2016)

Hannah Hofer better known by the mononym Hannah is an Austrian schlager singer. She is signed to Sony Music.

Hannah made a vocal training in rock / pop music at the Powervoice Academy in Hannover and later worked as a vocal coach and a professional singer. In 2011 she released her solo album Es muss aussa in 2011 with some chart success. The follow-up album Weiber, es ist Zeit! in 2013 made it to number 3 in the Austrian Albums chart.

Hannah married in July 2014. She has two children from a previous relationship.

== Discography ==
=== Albums ===
| Year | Album | Peak positions |
| Year | Album | AUT |
|---|---|---|
| 2011 | Es muss aussa | 29 |
| 2013 | Weiber, es isch Zeit! | 3 |
| 2016 | Aufstieg | 3 |
| 2019 | Kinder vom Land | 1 |
