= List of storms named Hanna =

The names Hanna, Hana, and Hannah have been used for fifteen tropical cyclones: six in the Atlantic Ocean, one in the Central Pacific Ocean, seven in the West Pacific Ocean (including five in the Philippine Area of Responsibility), and one in the Australian region. Hannah has also been used for one European windstorm. Hanna replaced Hortense on the Atlantic naming lists after the latter's retirement following the 1996 season.

In the Atlantic:

- Hurricane Hannah (1959) – a Category 3 hurricane that did not affect land.
- Tropical Storm Hanna (2002) – made landfall in Louisiana and the border between Alabama and Mississippi.
- Hurricane Hanna (2008) – a Category 1 hurricane that caused over 500 fatalities in Haiti before making landfall in South Carolina.
- Tropical Storm Hanna (2014) – made landfall in Nicaragua.
- Hurricane Hanna (2020) – a Category 1 hurricane that made landfall in Texas; also the earliest-forming eighth named storm of an Atlantic hurricane season
- Tropical Storm Hanna (2026) – a weak and short-lived tropical storm that did not affect land.

In the Central Pacific:

- Tropical Storm Hana (1982)

In the West Pacific:

- Typhoon Hannah (1947) – a Category 3 typhoon.
- Tropical Depression Hannah (1997) (01W, Atring) – affected the Caroline Islands.
- Tropical Storm Lekima (2007) (T0714, 16W, Hanna) – a severe tropical storm that caused over 100 fatalities across China, the Philippines, and Vietnam.
- Tropical Storm Tokage (2011) (T1107, 09W, Hanna) – did not affect land.
- Typhoon Soudelor (2015) (T1513, 13W, Hanna) – a Category 5-equivalent super typhoon that made landfall in Saipan, Taiwan, and China, causing severe damage.
- Typhoon Lekima (2019) (T1910, 10W, Hanna) – a Category 4-equivalent super typhoon that made landfall in China, becoming one of the country's costliest tropical cyclones.
- Typhoon Haikui (2023) (T2311, 10W, Hanna) – a Category 3-equivalent typhoon that made landfall in Taiwan and near Hong Kong, becoming the wettest tropical cyclone to affect the latter.

Hanna replaced Harurot on the Philippine naming lists after the latter's retirement following the 2003 season.

In the Australian region:

- Cyclone Hannah (1972) – a Category 3 severe tropical cyclone.

In Europe:

- Storm Hannah (2019) – affected Ireland and the United Kingdom, causing over 30,000 power outages in the former.

== See also ==
- Storm Hannelore (2023) – a European windstorm and medicane with a similar name.
- Hurricane Hannah (disambiguation), for non-meteorological uses of the term, including
  - Hurricane Hannah, a fictional hurricane unleashed by Kosmo the Inscrutable in the American video game Voodoo Vince to destroy the eponymous voodoo doll Vince

| Preceded by Gavino | Pacific typhoon season names Hanna | Succeeded by Ineng |
