= Hina Iwasaki =

Japanese politician (born 1993)

- 岩崎 比菜
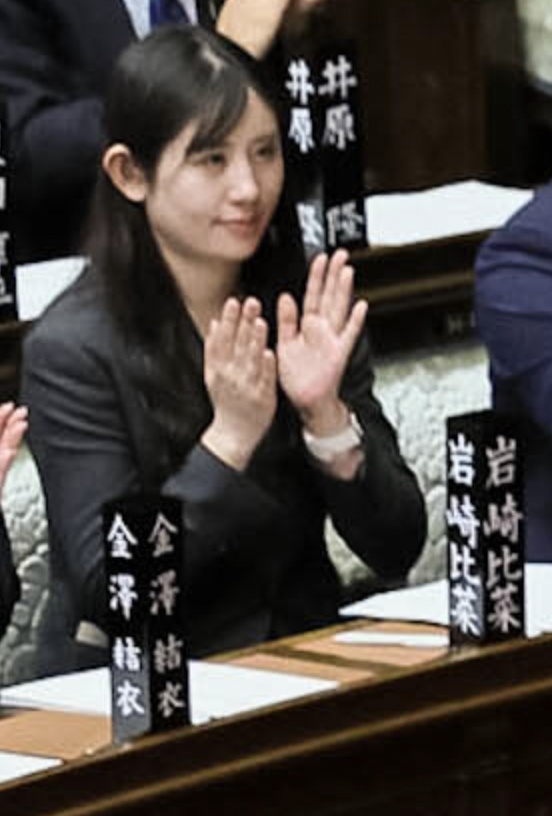
- Iwasaki in 2026

Member of the House of Representatives
- Incumbent
- Assumed office 9 February 2026
- Constituency: Southern Kanto PR

Personal details
- Born: 27 March 1993 (age 33) Ichikawa, Chiba, Japan
- Party: Liberal Democratic
- Education: Keio University

Hina Iwasaki (岩崎比菜, Iwasaki Hina; born 27 March 1993) is a Japanese politician serving as a member of the House of Representatives since 2026. She previously served as CEO of a management consulting firm.
