= Galu, West Azerbaijan =

Galu گلو
- Village
- Location within Iran
- Coordinates: 36°13′21″N 45°27′19″E
- Country: Iran
- Province: West Azerbaijan
- County: Sardasht
- Bakhsh: Vazineh
- Rural District: Melkari

Population (2006)
  - Total: 89
- Time zone: UTC+3:30 (IRST)
  - Summer (DST): UTC+4:30 (IRDT)

Galu (Persian: گلو, also Romanized as Galū) is a village in Melkari Rural District, Vazineh District, Sardasht County, West Azerbaijan Province, Iran. At the 2006 census, its population was 89, in 16 families.
