= Hannah (Australian singer) =

Australian singer

Hannah Reid
- Genre: Pop
- Label: Vibe Music Australia

Hannah Reid, known mononymously as Hannah, is an Australian pop singer, songwriter and musician.

== Biography ==
Her debut single, "No Relief" was released in April 2002 and entered the ARIA Singles Chart at #40. But it was reported her mother helped buy her into the Australian top 40 after her mother encouraged friends and family to buy multiple copies in a bid to push her to the charts. After this was discovered, many sales were removed by ARIA's chart compilers.

Her follow-up single was "Stop n Think" in November 2002. Both singles peaked at #18 on the singles chart.

== Discography ==
=== Singles ===
Year	Single	Peak positions
Year	Single	AUS
2002	"No Relief"	18
2002	"Stop n Think"	18
