= Hanna, West Virginia =

Hanna
- Unincorporated community
- Location within the state of West Virginia Hanna (the United States)
- Coordinates: 39°10′6″N 81°23′42″W
- Country: United States
- State: West Virginia
- County: Wood
- Elevation: 584 ft (178 m)
- Time zone: UTC-5 (Eastern (EST))
  - Summer (DST): UTC-4 (EDT)
- GNIS ID: 1549726

Hanna is an unincorporated community in Wood County, West Virginia, United States.
