= Hannah Run =

Stream in Adams County, Ohio, U.S.

Coordinates: 38°47′3″N 83°36′10″W

Hannah Run is a stream in Adams County, Ohio.

Hannah Run was named for William Hannah, a pioneer settler. It flows through rural areas, contributing to the local ecosystem and providing water for wildlife.

== See also ==
- List of rivers of Ohio
