= Hina Jamelle =

American architect

Hina Jamelle is an architect living in the United States.

== Biography ==
Jamelle is a director at Contemporary Architecture Practice (CAP) in New York City, which she joined in 2003, as well as a lecturer at the University of Pennsylvania School of Design and the Pratt Institute. At PennDesign, she directs the urban housing studio curriculum for the second year Master of Architecture design studio, and the final semester of the visual studies curriculum.

Her work has focused on the use of digital design techniques to create elegant aesthetics and integration of form and systems in design.

Before Joining CAP, Jamelle was a Client Partner at Razorfish in New York. Her work with CAP has been exhibited at MOMA, the Serpentine Gallery in London, amongst others. Her work has been published in news and scholarly organizations from The New York Times, to Architectural Design and Spa-De in Japan.

== Professional Work ==
=== Projects ===
- 2010 IWI Orthodontics, IWI. Tokyo, Japan.
- 2008 Wall of The Future. Museum of Modern Art. Home Delivery
- 2005 Light Fixture Design for Ivalo Lighting Inc. Subsidiary of Lutron. Philadelphia. PA.
- 2004 Commercial Office Tower. Dubai, U.A.E.
- 2004 Residential Tower. Dubai, U.A.E.
- 2004 Reebok Flagship Store. Shanghai, China.

=== Publications ===
Hina Jamelle edited a volume of Architectural Design with Ali Rahim:

- Elegance. Beyond Digital Techniques in Architecture. Architectural Design. Academy Editions/John Wiley and Sons Inc., London. January 2007.

=== Awards and honors ===
- “Record Interiors 2010.” One of eight winning projects. Architectural Record, McGraw-Hill. New York. September 2010.
- Product of the Month for Ivalo Light fixture in collaboration with Corian. Architectural Record, McGraw-Hill. New York. June 2007.
- Finalist. Museum of Modern Art / PS1. New York, NY. 2006.
- “100 of the World's most Exceptional Emerging Architects selected by 10 critics” 10 x 10_2 . Phaidon Press, New York, Spring 2006.
- “Design Vanguard 2004”. Architectural Record, McGraw-Hill. New York. December 2004.

=== Exhibitions ===
- 2008 “Home Delivery: Fabricating the Modern Dwelling”. Museum of Modern Art, New York.
- Co-Editor with Ali Rahim. Elegance: Beyond Digital Techniques in Architecture. Architectural Design. Academy Editions/John Wiley and Sons Inc., London. January 2007.
- Nicolai Oroussof. “:)Instant Houses, Then and Now,” New York Times, July 18, 2008.
- “IWI Orthodontics.” Spa-De. Tokyo, Japan. May 2010.
- Hannes Mayer. “IWI Orthodontics”. Archithese. Zurich, Switzerland. May 2011
- IWI Orthodontics, Tokyo.” Shotenkenchiku, Vol.56, No.02, Tokyo, Japan. February 2011.
- Naomi Pollock. “Record Interiors 2010. IWI Orthodontics, Tokyo.” Architectural Record. September 2010.
- “Focus: IWI Orthodontics _ Contemporary Architecture Practice.” Space Magazine No. 514. Seoul, Korea. August 2010.
- Kanae Hasigawa “White Stripes: IWI Orthodontics.” Frame Magazine. Netherlands. June 2010.
- “IWI Orthodontics.” Monitor Unlimited, London, Moscow. April 2010.
- “Louis Vuitton in IWI Orthodontics.” Casa Brutus. Tokyo, Japan. February 10, 2010
- “From Tokyo: IWI Orthodontics.” Elle Deco. Tokyo, Japan. January 6, 2010.
- “Neil Spiller. Architecture Now. Thames and Hudson. London. January 2009.
- http://www.moma.org/interactives/exhibitions/yap/archive_year.html
- 10x10_2 100 Architects 10 Critics. London. Phaidon. 2006.
- Mark C. Taylor. “Design Vanguard 2004”. Architectural Record, McGraw-Hill. New York. December 2004.
