= Hanna, Missouri =

Former community in the U.S. state of Missouri

Coordinates: 37°44′06″N 92°14′49″W

Hanna is a former community in southwestern Pulaski County, in the U.S. state of Missouri.

The location is on the west bank of Roubidoux Creek at the terminus of Missouri Route NN. The location is approximately three miles southeast of Laquey and Missouri Route 17 and 1.5 miles west of the west boundary of Fort Leonard Wood.

A post office called Hanna was established in 1901, and remained in operation until 1943. The community has the name of Mark Hanna, a United States Senator from Ohio.
