= Henna (name) =

Henna (حنّا) is an Arabic name for John. It is a common given name as well as a surname, particularly among Arab Christians. The Arabic / Hebrew female name Hannah (حَنَّة meaning "blessed") is rarely also anglicized as Henna. The Hebrew female name Hannah is also used in Yiddish as Henna, Henny or Chienna, and anglicized to Henna. Henna is also a Finnish female given name (different root; shares the root with Henry).

== Given name ==
- Henna Johansson (born 1991), Swedish wrestler
- Henna Lindholm (born 1989), Finnish ice dancer
- Henna Raita (born 1975), Finnish skier
- Henna Vänninen (born 1983), Finnish actress
- Henna Virkkunen (born 1972), Finnish politician

== Surname ==
- Bonnie Henna, South African actress
- Christian Henna (born 1972), French soccer player
- Julio J. Henna (1848–1924), Puerto Rican physician
- Sisanda Henna (born 1982), South African actor
