= Henna Vänninen =

Finnish actress

- Born: 17 September 1983 (age 41); Helsinki, Finland

Henna Vänninen (born 17 September 1983 in Helsinki) is a Finnish actress. She is known for her role as Aamu Korhonen in the popular Finnish soap opera Salatut elämät.

== Filmography ==
- television series Zulu
- television series Salatut elämät – as Aamu Korhonen (2001–2004)
- Drama Ja ilta oli rauhaisa – as Galja (director Matti Salo) 1999
- Drama Hilman päivät, Seinäjoki summer theater (director Kari Mattila) 2003
