= Voodoo Vince =

2003 video game

- North American Xbox cover art
- Developer: Beep Industries
- Publishers: Microsoft Game Studios; Beep Games (Xbox One & PC)
- Director: Clayton Kauzlaric
- Programmer: Kurt Pfeifer
- Composer: Steve Kirk
- Platforms: Xbox; Xbox One; Microsoft Windows
- Release: Xbox: NA: September 23, 2003; EU: October 17, 2003; JP: July 22, 2004; Xbox One, Microsoft Windows: WW: April 18, 2017
- Genre: Platform
- Mode: Single-player

Voodoo Vince is a 2003 platform video game developed by American developer Beep Industries and published by Microsoft Game Studios for the Xbox. Unlike other Xbox games, however, this game is not compatible with the Xbox 360. It was released in North America on September 23, 2003, in Europe on October 17, 2003, and in Japan on July 22, 2004. A remastered version for Microsoft Windows and Xbox One was released by Beep Games under license from Microsoft on April 18, 2017.

== Gameplay ==
In the game, the player controls Vince, a voodoo doll who can perform an assortment of moves to make his way through the levels. Vince can perform standard moves such as jumps, punches, and a spin attack. The game revolves around Vince's ability to use voodoo powers, which the player can get by finding special voodoo icons scattered through the game. When Vince's voodoo power meter is full, the player can use a voodoo power to destroy every enemy nearby. Each voodoo power uniquely hurts Vince, but they all have roughly the same effect on Vince's enemies.

Scattered throughout the game's levels are special items for Vince to collect: Zombie Dust Bags, which upon collecting 100 will increase Vince's health bar; Hearts, which give Vince extra lives; Beads, which are collected from fallen enemies and fill Vince's voodoo power meter; and Skull Pages, which upon collecting all in a certain level will reveal a Skull. If the player manages to find, chase, and capture the Skull, it will increase the number of voodoo powers Vince can perform at one time. Many levels also offer a trolley station, which allows the player to travel between different levels of the game.

Many of the game's levels have some sort of puzzle in which Vince must activate some sort of device to use it to inflict pain on himself to destroy a larger enemy (the bosses in particular). For instance, in one of the first levels of the game, Vince must defeat a pair of unruly gas pumps, by setting himself on fire and then throwing himself in a puddle of gasoline surrounding the gas pumps.

Several levels differ from the standard gameplay the player experiences through the rest of the game and involve piloting a vehicle or playing a minigame. Over the course of the game, the player controls Vince piloting an airplane, a swamp boat, a submarine, a bumper car, and other vehicles.

== Plot ==
=== Setting ===
The story of Voodoo Vince is told through the course of the game and the game manual, which reveals the names of some of the characters in the game and has bios of the game's main characters.

=== Characters ===
- Vince — Vince is the third-best of Madam Charmaine's voodoo dolls. As a voodoo doll, he can hurt himself to hurt his enemies. Vince is only ten inches tall and is made almost entirely of burlap. He has a rather sarcastic attitude, often pointing out and criticizing obvious video game concepts without breaking the fourth wall.
- Madam Charmaine — Madam Charmaine runs a voodoo shop in the French Quarter of New Orleans. She helps people who need it and sometimes uses Vince if necessary. She is wise and has great knowledge of magic and crafting voodoo dolls. Since Vince is her creation, she maintains a telepathic connection with Vince and guides him through the game.
- Kosmo the Inscrutable — A seventh-grade drop-out, Kosmo has plans for world domination, and has attempted many times to obtain Zombie Dust, the source of Madam Charmaine's powers. He runs the Carnival De Prave, where he slowly hatches his plan to conquer the world. He often appears as a floating disembodied head, taunting Vince and telling the voodoo doll to turn back.
- Jeb & Fingers — Kosmo's clumsy henchmen who are unable to find better jobs. According to their bio in the game manual, Fingers lost his fingers in a carnival ride accident.

=== Story ===
The game opens with Jeb and Fingers breaking into Madam Charmaine's voodoo shop to steal her Zombie Dust. In their attempt, they accidentally release the powers of the Zombie Dust, causing chaos in the shop. In the confusion, a stray bit of Zombie Dust hits Vince, bringing him to life. Madam Charmaine enters the room and attempts to stop the ruckus, but is hit by a flying object and is knocked unconscious. Jeb and Fingers then tie up Madam Charmaine and take her and her Zombie Dust to their boss, Kosmo the Inscrutable. Already, the escaped Zombie Dust starts to bend and warp reality due to Jeb and Fingers' less than careful handling.

Back in the voodoo shop, Vince is given life as a result of the zombie dust's power. After a telepathic communication from Madam Charmaine, Vince leaves to rescue her. Vince travels through the French Quarter of New Orleans, where he defeats a few enemies in his way such as a sleepy "Piggy Bank of Doom" and Reggie and Primo, two unruly gas pumps. In the square, Bones McMurty, a skeleton jazz musician, tells Vince that he can find many answers in a nearby museum, but that he will only let him in if Vince plays a song with him. After exploring some of the shops in the square and producing a trumpet, Vince does a duet with the skeleton, who lets him into the museum. Inside, the floating head of Kosmo causes a dinosaur skeleton named "The Bone Goliath" to come to life and attack Vince. Using his voodoo powers, Vince defeats the dinosaur and discovers a hidden tunnel beneath its feet.

After falling through the tunnel, Vince finds himself in the underground city of Roachfort, where he meets Professor Ethel, an egotistical turtle who is trying to make a balloon that will take them back to the surface. The professor sends Vince through Roachfort to gather supplies for the balloon, but when it is complete the balloon fails to take off due to too much weight. The professor chooses between her personal belongings and Vince and decides to throw Vince off. After defeating the "obligatory boss battle" (a two-headed cyclopean alligator named Janice), Vince finds a tank of helium, which he uses to inflate himself and rise to the surface.

Vince arrives in Crypt City, a massive cemetery full of zombies. After a second meeting with Bones McMurty, defeating some monsters, putting some of the resident zombies to rest and destroying a massive statue brought to life by Kosmo, Vince travels to Brusque Manor. The Manor is home to Dolly, a seemingly cute doll with a short temper who tells Vince that Madam Charmaine was taken to the Carnival DePrave. She offers to take Vince there but demands that Vince defeat the monsters inside the Manor. After doing so, Dolly tells Vince they will take a train. But it turns out that the train is just a large model railroad set up, at which point Vince complains of his bad luck and his dealings with crazy people. Dolly, feeling insulted and with help from Kosmo pulling the string behind her back, changes into a larger and more hideous doll and proceeds to attack Vince, destroying her toy city. Vince uses the model railroad to hurt himself, thus destroying Dolly. Afterward, he finds a passageway leading out of the Manor.

At the end of the passageway is the Bayou, home to a "colorful local character" named Crawdad Jimmy. Crawdad Jimmy also offers to take Vince to the Carnival DePrave but asks him to collect some ingredients for his gumbo (onion, sausage, crawfish). After Vince successfully collects the ingredients and wins a swamp boat race, Crawdad Jimmy reveals that he was just buying time for Kosmo, who unleashes a hurricane named Hurricane Hannah to destroy Vince. Using some fans and a windmill, Vince manages to defeat the hurricane and makes his way to the Carnival DePrave.

In the Carnival DePrave, Vince has to face down some more challenges Kosmo has set up for him, including an “obligatory evil twin” to activate the carnival's rides to reach a runway with a motorcycle that Vince can use to jump into the Big Top, where Madam Charmaine is being held. Upon entering the Big Top, Vince finds that Kosmo is piloting a massive robot, called the "Kosmobot", which he then tries to use to crush Vince. Vince manages to hurt himself, dismantling the robot's legs. He then has to climb up the robot to get to an airplane, which he uses to fly into the robot's head. Inside the head, Vince climbs to the top and attacks the brain, destroying the robot. Vince manages to get out just in time before the robot explodes.

Just as Vince is celebrating his triumph, he realizes he forgot Madam Charmaine and turns around. Fortunately, Madam Charmaine is fine, as are Kosmo and his henchmen. Kosmo attempts to use his last bit of Zombie Dust to defeat Madam Charmaine, but she easily repels the attack. Using some Zombie Dust Vince gives her, Madam Charmaine uses her magic to turn Kosmo and his henchmen into balloons. Then, Vince pops them using his powers, and with their enemy gone, at last, Vince and Madam Charmaine start the journey back home. As the credits roll, Vince questions Madam Charmaine on why, if she's so powerful, she can't provide a decent home or even a second eye.

== Developer ==
Beep Industries logo

Beep Games (formerly Beep Industries) is an American video game developer that created Voodoo Vince. Beep Games was founded in 2000 as Beep Industries by Clayton Kauzlaric. Their only console release is Voodoo Vince. Two years after the release of Voodoo Vince, the company made a series of downloadable PC games, which were released to Gamehouse, Oberon Media and RealArcade, with Realms of Gold, Word Spiral, Four Houses, Zodiac, and Flying Leo. Beep Games released an iPad version of Word Spiral in 2010. Kauzlaric partnered with a long-time associate Ron Gilbert to release The Big Big Castle in 2012 and Scurvy Scallywags in The Voyage to Discover The Ultimate Sea Shanty in 2013. Microsoft currently owns the Voodoo Vince IP.

== Remastered version ==
Kauzlaric announced in October 2016 that a remastered version of Voodoo Vince was planned for early 2017 for the Xbox One and Microsoft Windows. The remastered version improves the art assets, changes the loading screens (as well as shortens the time length), and leaves the gameplay untouched, although some of the audio in the game is either missing, cut suddenly, or replaced with different sounds. The original release was not eligible for backward compatibility on the Xbox 360 due to the use of some custom code, according to Kauzlaric. He started working with a small team in mid-2016 to bring the game to modern platforms.

== Reception ==
Reception

Aggregate scores
Aggregator	Score
GameRankings	76.87%
Metacritic	73/100

Review scores
Publication	Score
Edge	4/10
Electronic Gaming Monthly	6.5/10
Eurogamer	7/10
Famitsu	26/40
Game Informer	8.5/10
GamePro	4/5
GameRevolution	B−
GameSpot	7.8/10
GameSpy	3/5
GameZone	8/10
IGN	7.6/10
Official Xbox Magazine (US)	8.8/10
The Cincinnati Enquirer	3.5/5
The Village Voice	9/10

The game was met with positive reception upon release, as GameRankings gave it a score of 76.87%, while Metacritic gave it 73 out of 100. Dwellers Included gave Voodoo Vince: Remastered a 4.0 out of 5, saying "The game is oozing with charisma and character that fans, new and old, will be able to find both hilarious and challenging."
