= Hana, Fars =

Hana حنا
- Village
- Location within Iran
- Coordinates: 28°33′55″N 53°30′59″E
- Country: Iran
- Province: Fars
- County: Jahrom
- Bakhsh: Central
- Rural District: Jolgah

Population (2006)
  - Total: 560
- Time zone: UTC+3:30 (IRST)
  - Summer (DST): UTC+4:30 (IRDT)

Hana (Persian: حنا, also Romanized as Ḩanā and Henā'; also known as Qal‘eh-i-Hina) is a village in Jolgah Rural District, in the Central District of Jahrom County, Fars province, Iran. At the 2006 census, its population was 560, in 123 families.
