= Hannah (1797 ship) =

History

Great Britain
- Name: Hannah
- Builder: Liverpool
- Launched: 1797
- Fate: Lost 1811

General characteristics
- Tons burthen: 195, or 198 (bm)
- Complement: 1797:20; 1798:25
- Armament: 1797:12 × 4&6&12-pounder guns; 1798:16 × 4&9-pounder guns; 1799:2 × 9-pounder + 14 × 4-pounder guns

Hannah was built at Liverpool in 1797. She made three voyages as a slave ship in the triangular trade in enslaved people. She then made one voyage as a whaler in the British southern whale fishery. Next, she became a West Indiaman and was lost in 1811.

== Career ==
Hannah first appeared in Lloyd's Register (LR) in 1797 with W.Stringer, master, R.Welsh, owner, and trade Liverpool–Africa.

1st voyage transporting enslaved people (1797–1798): Captain William Stringer acquired a letter of marque on 3 October 1797. He sailed from Liverpool on 6 November. In 1797, 104 vessels sailed from British ports bound for West Africa to transport enslaved people to the West Indies; 90 of these vessels had sailed from Liverpool.

Hannah commenced acquiring captives on 11 February 1798, first at Bonny Island and then at "Bomara". She arrived at Saint Croix on 15 May. She left St Croix on 21 June, and arrived back at Liverpool on 19 July.

At the time Saint Croix was a Danish colony. In 1792, the Danish government passed a law that would outlaw Danish participation in the trans-Atlantic enslaving trade, from early 1803 on. This led the government in the Danish West Indies to encourage the importation of captives prior to the ban taking effect. One measure that it took was to open the trade to foreign vessels. Records for the period 1796 to 1799 show that 24 British enslaving ships, most of them from Liverpool, arrived at St Croix and imported 6,781 captives.

2nd voyage transporting enslaved people (1798–1799): Captain James Good acquired a letter of marque on 14 August 1798. He sailed from Liverpool on 8 September 1798. In 1798, 160 vessels sailed from British ports bound for West Africa to transport enslaved people to the West Indies; 149 of these vessels had sailed from Liverpool. These were the highest numbers for the period 1795–1804.

Hannah acquired captives and arrived at St Croix on 6 April 1799. There she landed 320 captives. She left St Croix on 3 May and arrived back at Liverpool on 24 June. She had left Liverpool with 30 crew members and suffered four crew member deaths on the voyage.

3rd voyage transporting enslaved people (1799–1800): Captain Good sailed from Liverpool on 11 August 1799. In 1799, 156 vessels sailed from British ports bound for West Africa to transport enslaved people to the West Indies; 134 of these vessels had sailed from Liverpool.

Hannah arrived at Demerara on 5 March 1800 where she landed 303 captives. In her voyage she had left Liverpool with 30 crew members and she suffered 6 crew deaths on the voyage.

Year	Master	Owner	Trade	Source
1800	J.Good; T.Morrison	Abram & Co.	Liverpool–Africa; London–Dominica	LR
1803	J.Shadforth	Capt.&Co.	London–Dominica	LR
1804	T.Hullock	Collins	London–Southern Fishery	LR

Whaling voyage (1803–1805): Hannah was valued at £5,000 in 1802. Captain Izzack Hullock (or Hullah, or Hilcock), sailed from London on 1 February 1803, bound for the Pacific. Hannah returned on 13 September 1805.

Although Lloyd's Register showed Hannah as continuing to whale, there is no supporting evidence in Lloyd's List ship arrival and departure data.

Year	Master	Owner	Trade	Source & notes
1806	Hollock	Collins	London–Southern Fishery	LR
1808	Hollock; Davidson	Collins; Hodgen	London–Southern Fishery	LR; small repairs 1808
1809	Hollock; J.Rickets	Collins; P.Rains	London–Southern Fishery; Portsmouth–Surinam	Register of Shipping
1810	Duncan; William Ellis	Clark & Co.	London–Surinam	LR; small repairs 1808
1811	W. Ellis	Clark & Co.	London–Jamaica	LR; small repairs 1808

== Fate ==
Hannah, Ellis, master, was wrecked on 29 January 1811 near the Isla of Pines, Cuba. She was sailing from Jamaica to London.
