= Heena =

Heena may refer to:

- Heena Gavit, an Indian politician
- Heena Sidhu, an Indian sport shooter
