= Galu Hanna =

Galu Hanna گلوحنا
- Village
- Location within Iran
- Coordinates: 28°19′53″N 58°08′55″E
- Country: Iran
- Province: Kerman
- County: Anbarabad
- Bakhsh: Jebalbarez-e Jonubi
- Rural District: Mardehek

Population (2006)
  - Total: 321
- Time zone: UTC+3:30 (IRST)
  - Summer (DST): UTC+4:30 (IRDT)

Galu Hanna (Persian: گلوحنا, also Romanized as Galū Ḩannā, Gelū Ḩanā, and Gelū Ḩennā’; also known as Galū, Hanā’, Ḩanā, Hana, Ḩannā’, and Ḩennā’) is a village in Mardehek Rural District, Jebalbarez-e Jonubi District, Anbarabad County, Kerman Province, Iran. At the 2006 census, its population was 321, in 61 families.
