= 1968 Pacific typhoon season =

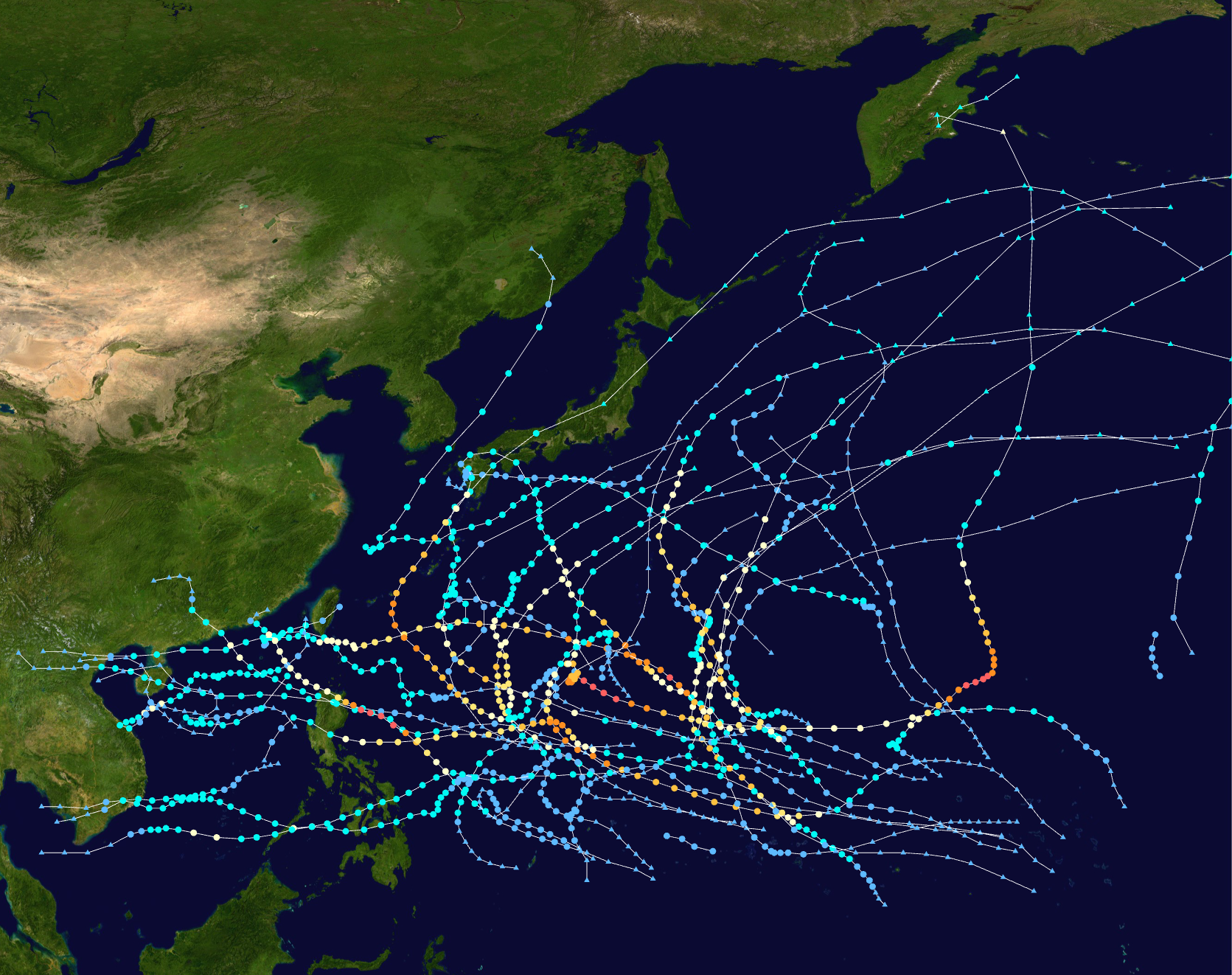
- Season summary map

Seasonal boundaries
- First system formed: January 20, 1968
- Last system dissipated: December 7, 1968

Strongest storm
- Name: Agnes
  - Maximum winds: 280 km/h (175 mph) (1-minute sustained)
  - Lowest pressure: 900 hPa (mbar)

Seasonal statistics
- Total depressions: 39
- Total storms: 28
- Typhoons: 20
- Very strong typhoons: 4 (unofficial)
- Total fatalities: 148
- Total damage: Unknown

Related articles
- 1968 Atlantic hurricane season; 1968 Pacific hurricane season; 1968 North Indian Ocean cyclone season

The 1968 Pacific typhoon season has no official bounds; it ran year-round in 1968, but most tropical cyclones tend to form in the northwestern Pacific Ocean between June and December. These dates conventionally delimit the period of each year when most tropical cyclones form in the northwestern Pacific Ocean.

The scope of this article is limited to the Pacific Ocean, north of the equator and west of the International Date Line. Storms that form east of the date line and north of the equator are called hurricanes; see 1968 Pacific hurricane season. Tropical Storms formed in the entire west pacific basin were assigned a name by the Joint Typhoon Warning Center. Tropical depressions in this basin have the "W" suffix added to their number. Tropical depressions that enter or form in the Philippine area of responsibility are assigned a name by the Philippine Weather Bureau, the predecessor of the Philippine Atmospheric, Geophysical and Astronomical Services Administration (PAGASA). This can often result in the same storm having two names.

== Systems ==
31 tropical depressions formed this year in the Western Pacific, of which 27 became tropical storms. 20 storms reached typhoon intensity, of which 4 reached super typhoon strength. No storms this season caused significant damage or deaths.

=== CMA Tropical Depression 01 ===
- Tropical depression (CMA)
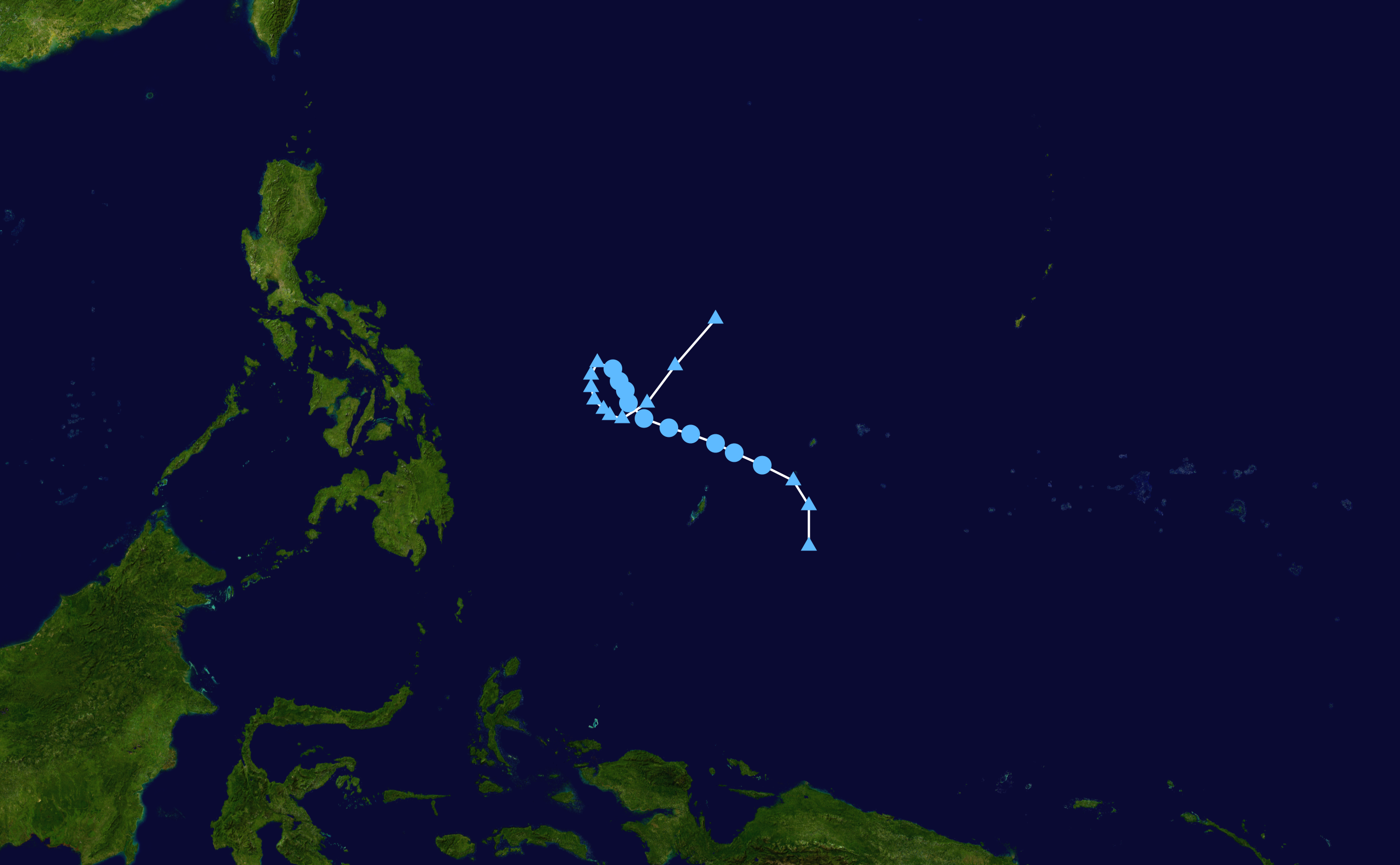
- Duration: January 21 – January 23
- Peak intensity: 55 km/h (35 mph) (10-min); 1002 hPa (mbar)

A tropical depression formed to the northwest of Palau. Moving north-northwest, the depression degenerated to a remnant low as it made a counterclockwise direction before dissipating.

This depression was not recognized by the JMA, but the CMA.

=== Tropical Storm 01W (Asiang) ===
- Tropical depression (JMA)
- Tropical storm (SSHWS)
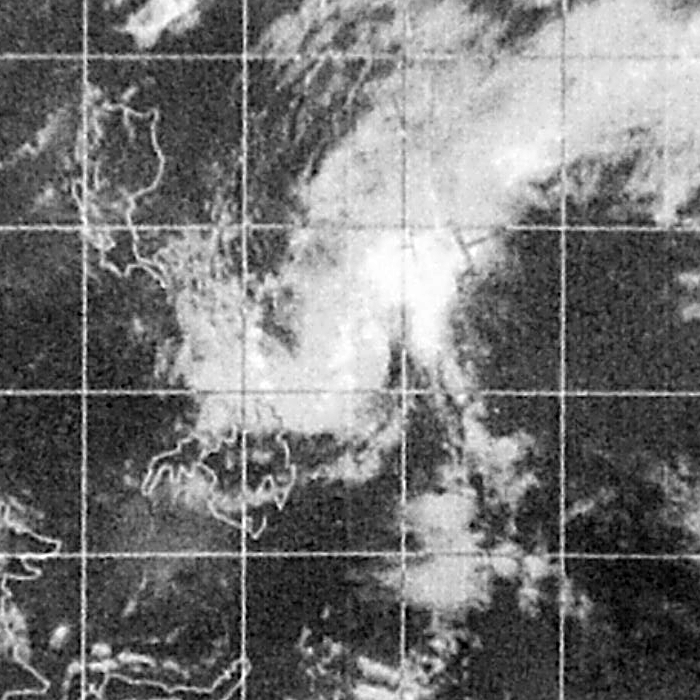
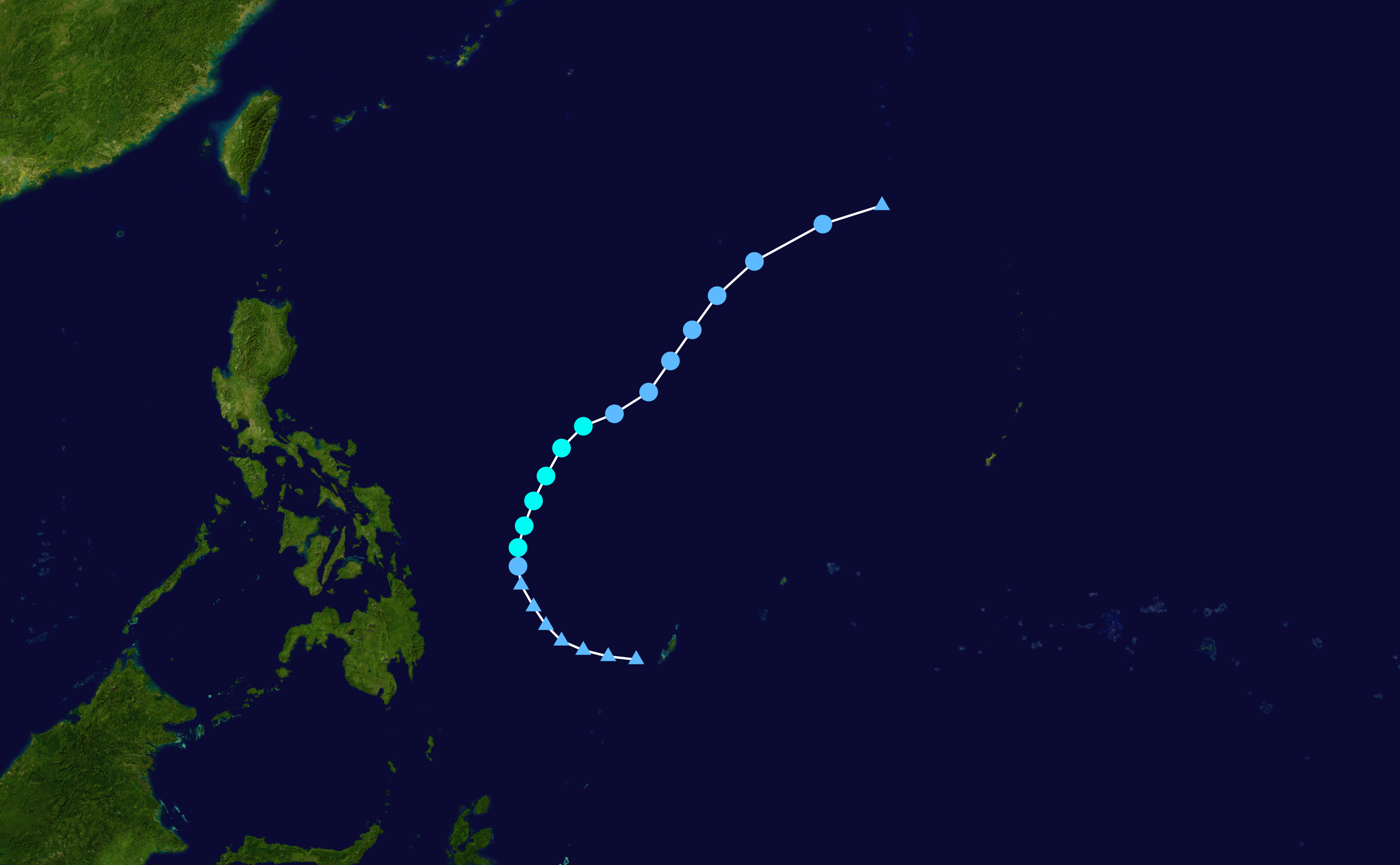
- Duration: February 28 – March 2
- Peak intensity: 65 km/h (40 mph) (1-min); 999 hPa (mbar)

01W formed east of the Philippines on February 28. It moved northwest, intensified into a tropical storm and soon dissipated on March 2.

=== Typhoon Jean ===
- Typhoon (JMA)
- Category 3-equivalent typhoon (SSHWS)
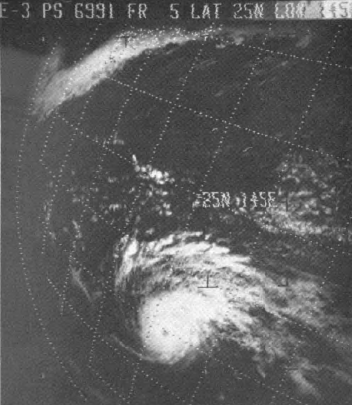
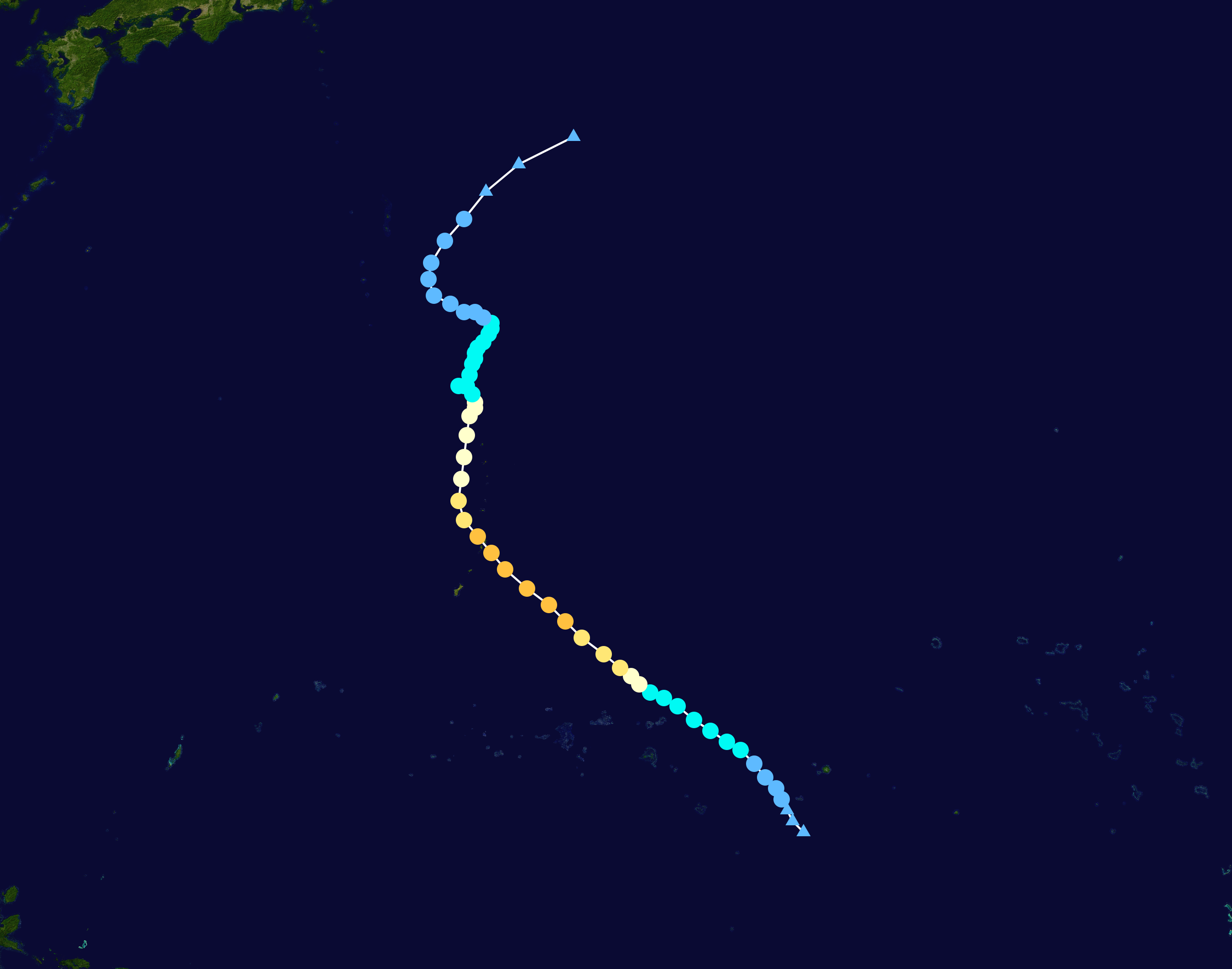
- Duration: April 5 – April 19
- Peak intensity: 205 km/h (125 mph) (1-min); 935 hPa (mbar)

Jean formed southeast of Guam on April 5. It moved northwest in the following days, strengthening to a Category 3 Typhoon with winds of 285km/h and central pressure of 935 hPa. The storm later curved northwest and dissipated on April 19.

=== Typhoon Kim (Biring) ===
- Typhoon (JMA)
- Category 3-equivalent typhoon (SSHWS)
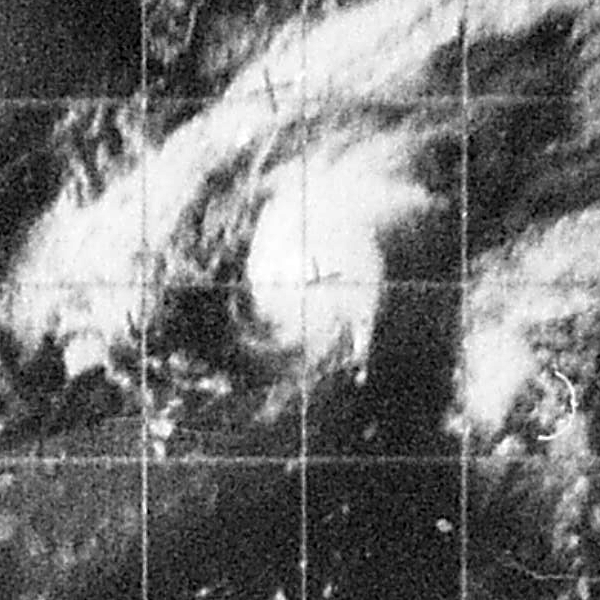
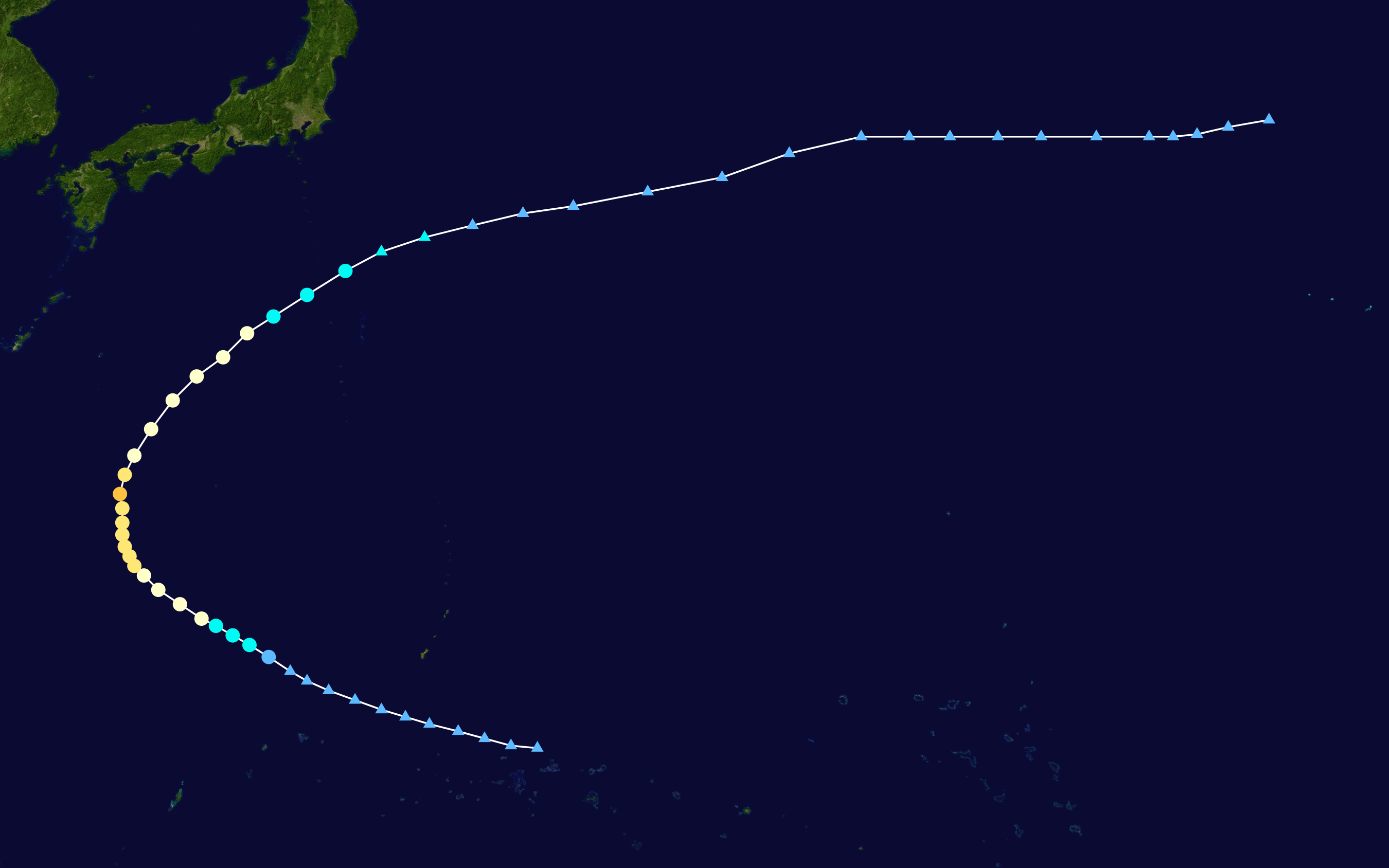
- Duration: May 28 – June 5
- Peak intensity: 185 km/h (115 mph) (1-min); 950 hPa (mbar)

Kim formed southeast of Guam on May 28. It intensified into a Category 3 typhoon while curving northeast. Kim slowly weakened as it moved north. The storm dissipated on June 5.

=== Tropical Depression 04W ===
- Tropical depression (JMA)
- Tropical depression (SSHWS)
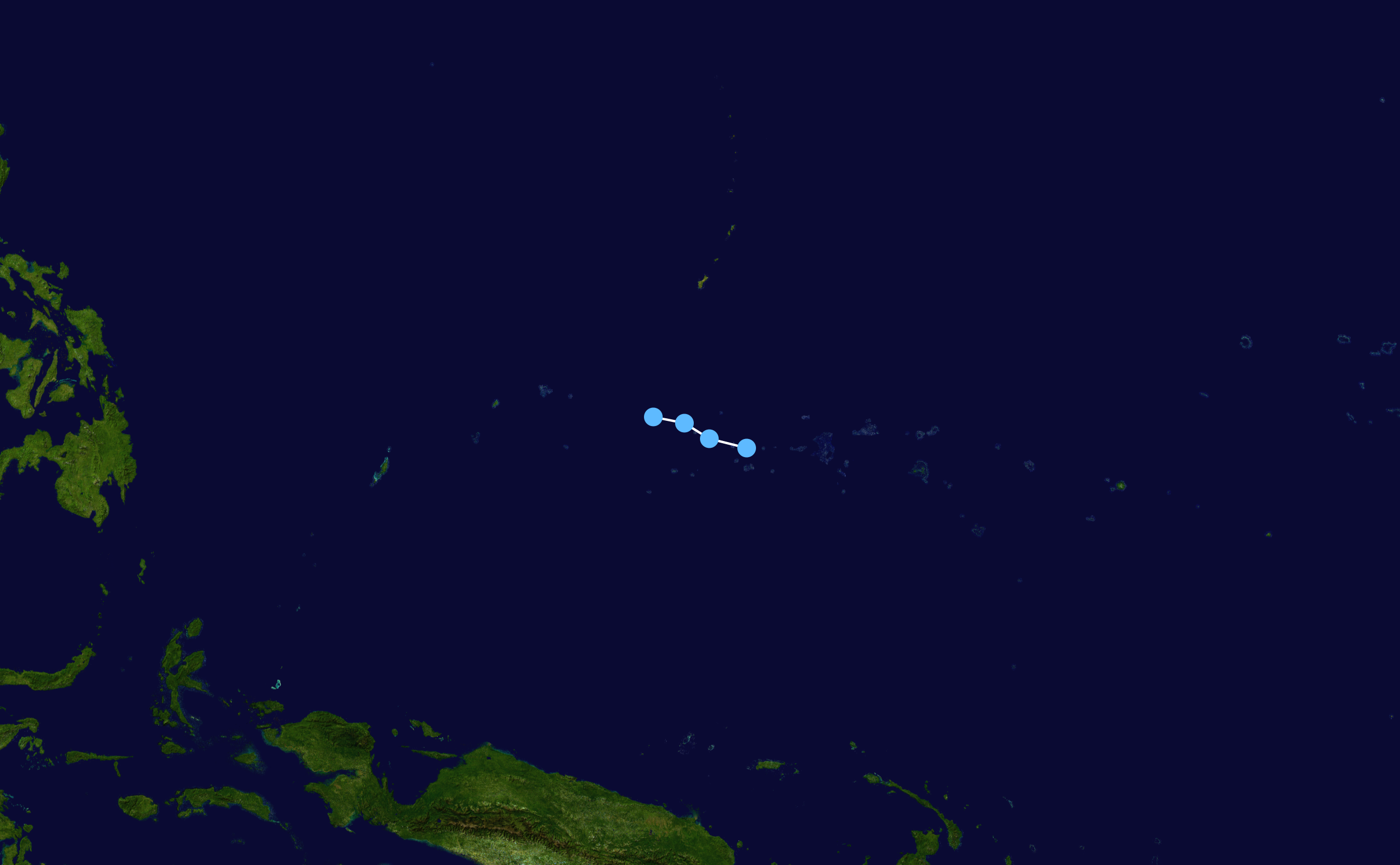
- Duration: June 2 – June 2
- Peak intensity: 45 km/h (30 mph) (1-min); 1006 hPa (mbar)

04W was an extremely short-lived storm that only lasted for a day.

=== Tropical Storm 05W ===
- Tropical depression (JMA)
- Tropical storm (SSHWS)
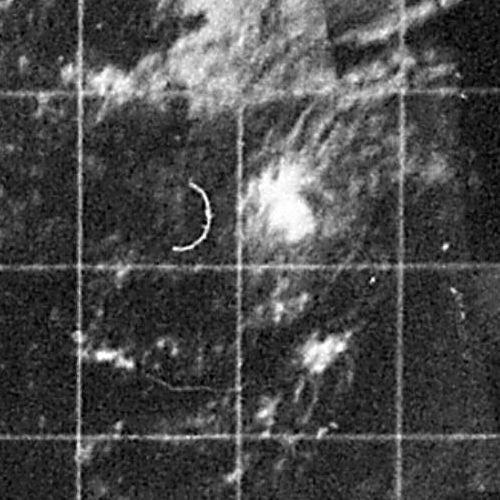
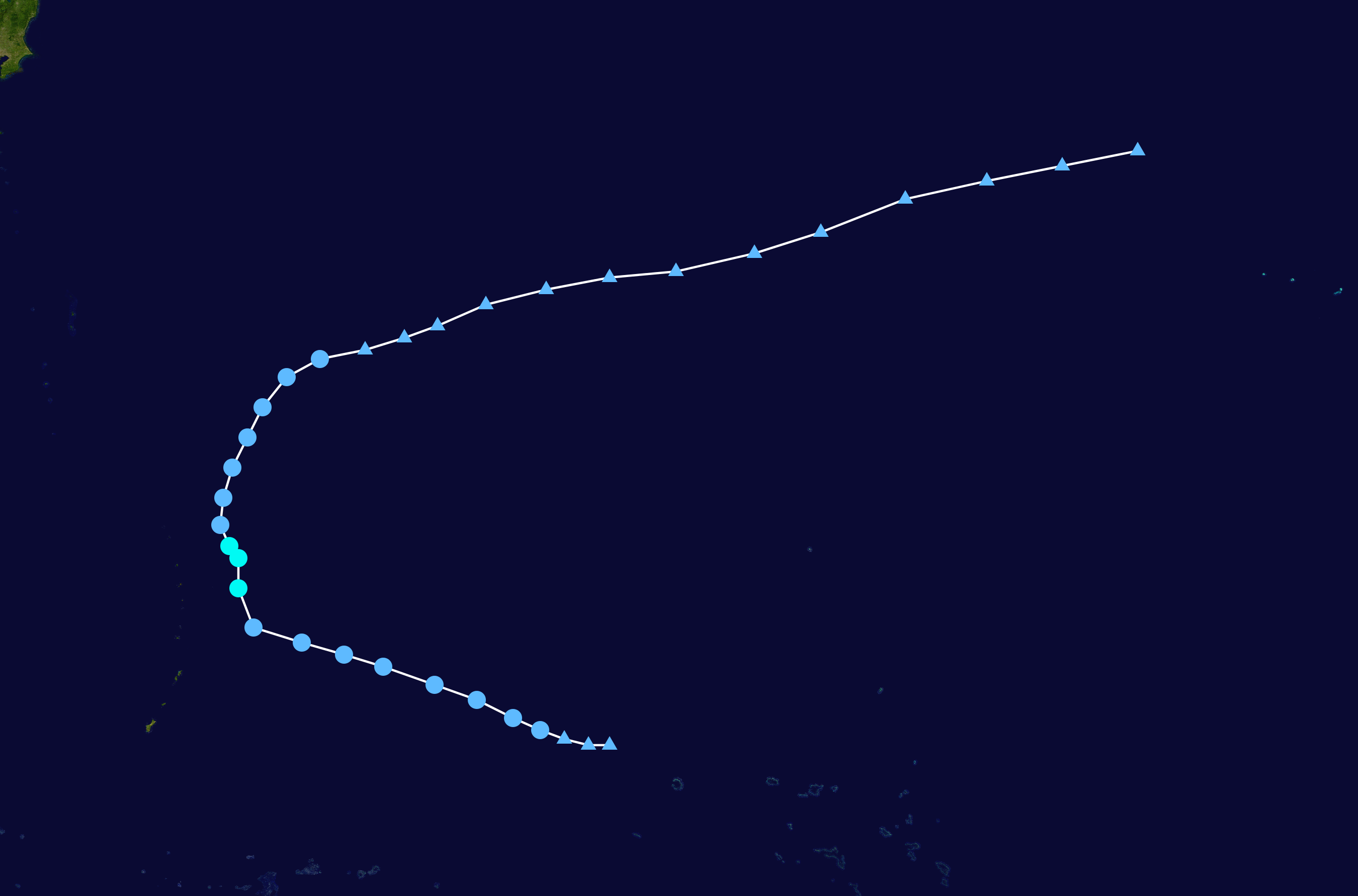
- Duration: June 4 – June 8
- Peak intensity: 65 km/h (40 mph) (1-min); 1002 hPa (mbar)

05W was a weak tropical storm that existed from June 4 to June 8.

=== Typhoon Lucy (Konsing) ===
- Typhoon (JMA)
- Category 3-equivalent typhoon (SSHWS)
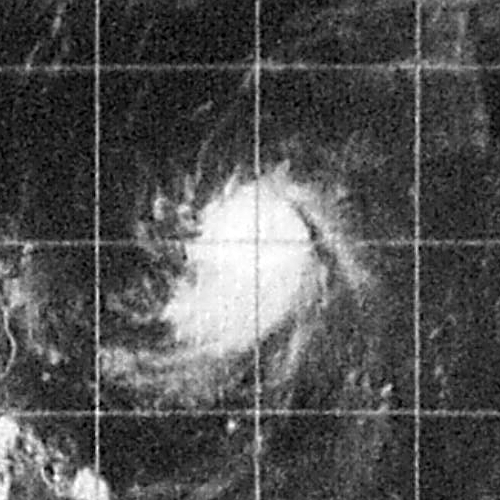
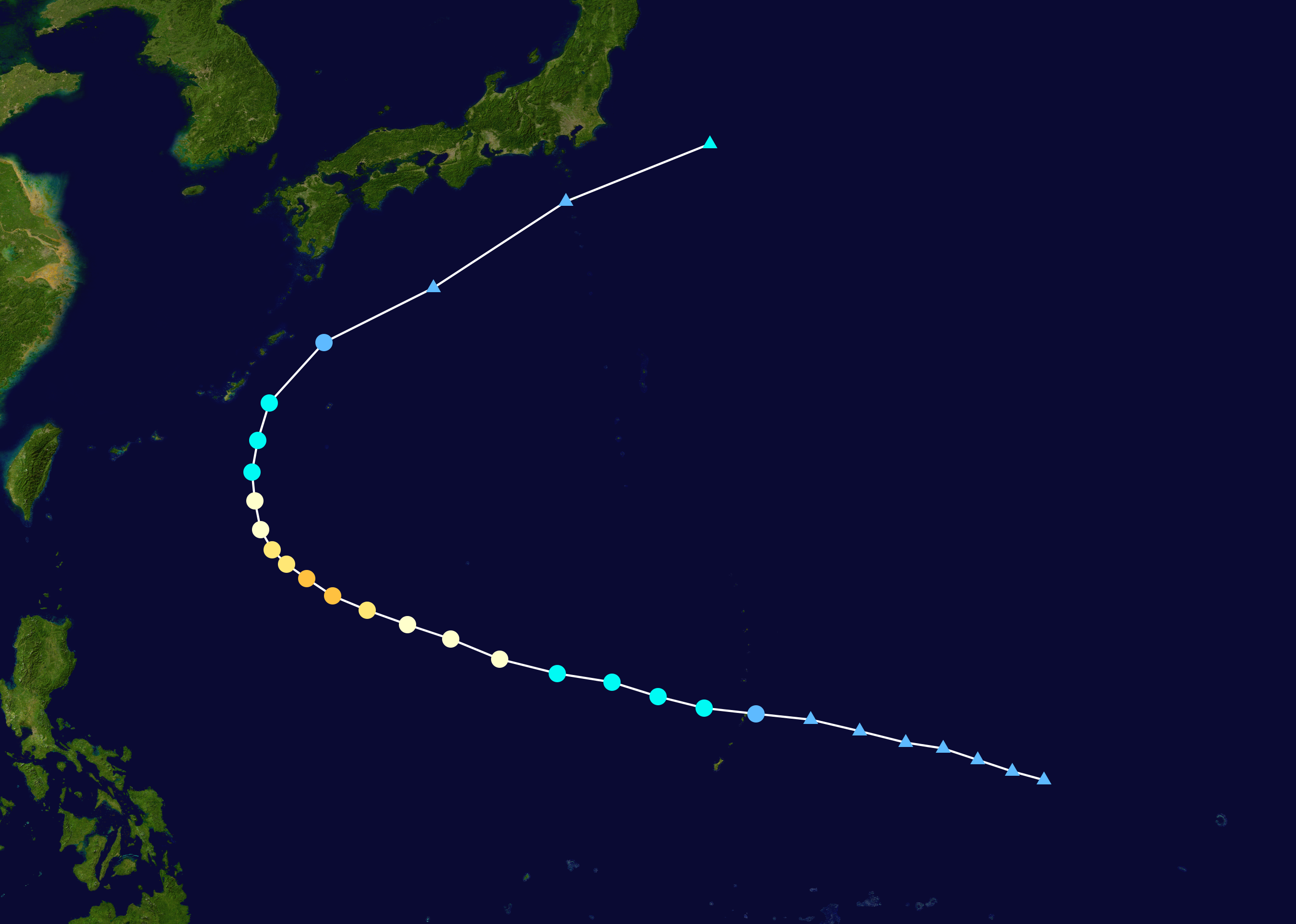
- Duration: June 26 – July 3
- Peak intensity: 205 km/h (125 mph) (1-min); 935 hPa (mbar)

Lucy was a category 3 typhoon that existed from May 28 to June 5.

=== Typhoon Mary ===
- Typhoon (JMA)
- Category 4-equivalent typhoon (SSHWS)
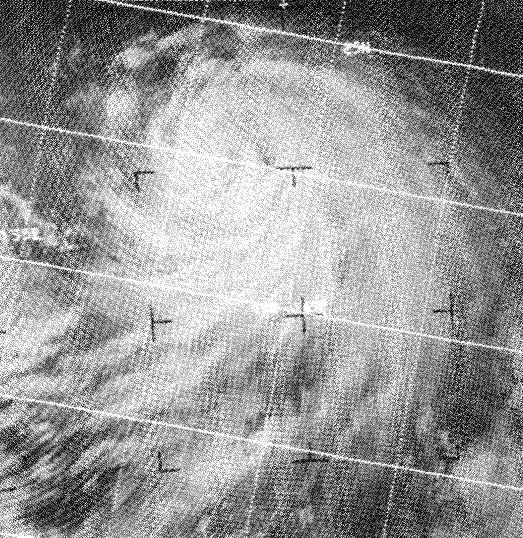
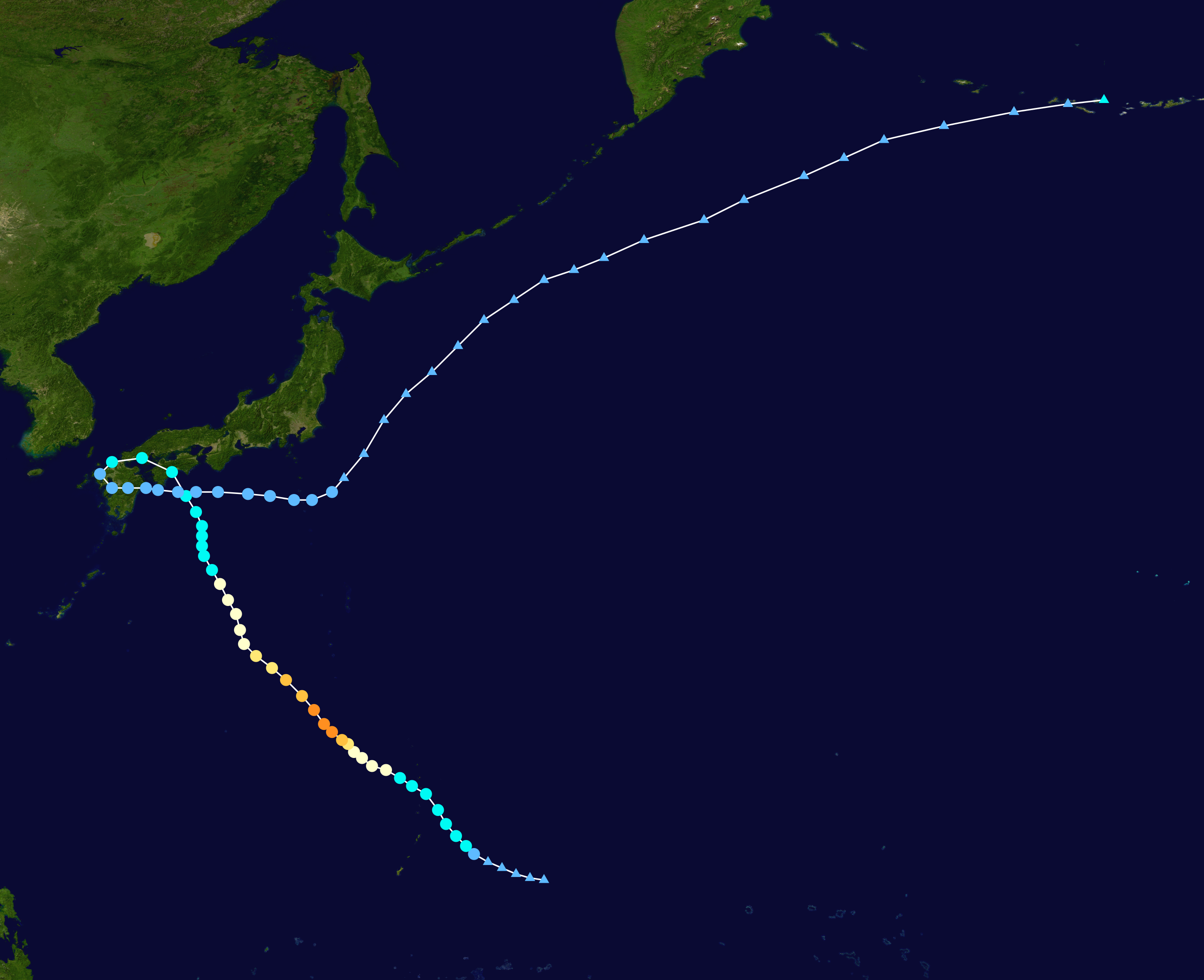
- Duration: July 19 – August 3
- Peak intensity: 240 km/h (150 mph) (1-min); 925 hPa (mbar)

Mary was a Category 4 super typhoon. It formed on July 19. Mary hit Japan as a tropical storm and dissipated on August 3.

=== Tropical Storm Nadine (Didang) ===
- Severe tropical storm (JMA)
- Tropical storm (SSHWS)
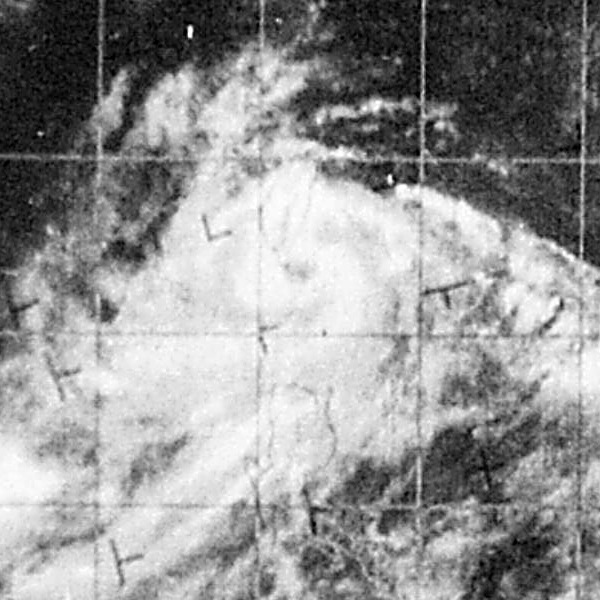
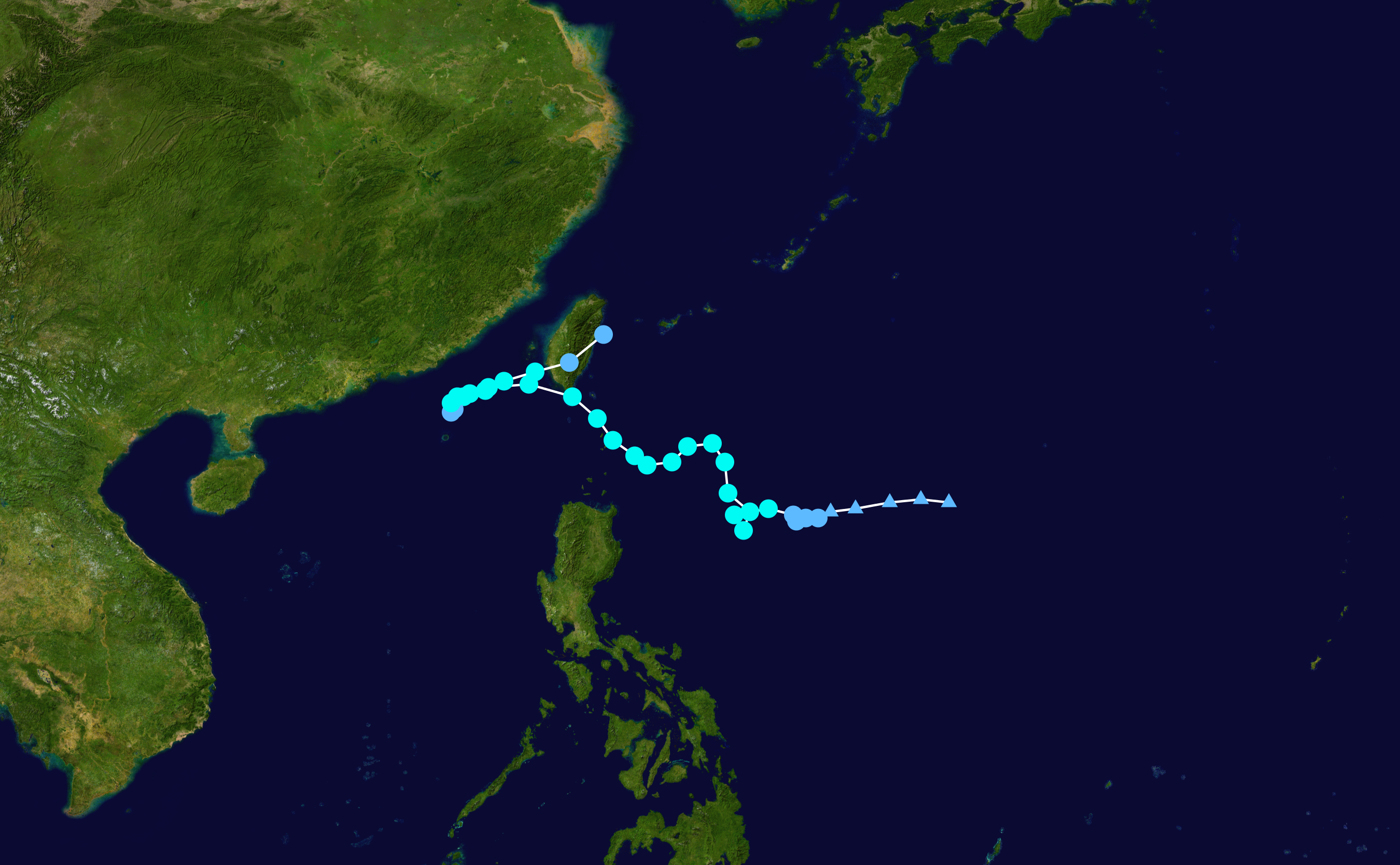
- Duration: July 20 – July 28
- Peak intensity: 110 km/h (70 mph) (1-min); 970 hPa (mbar)

Nadine existed from July 20 to July 28.

=== Tropical Storm Olive (Edeng) ===
- Tropical storm (JMA)
- Tropical storm (SSHWS)
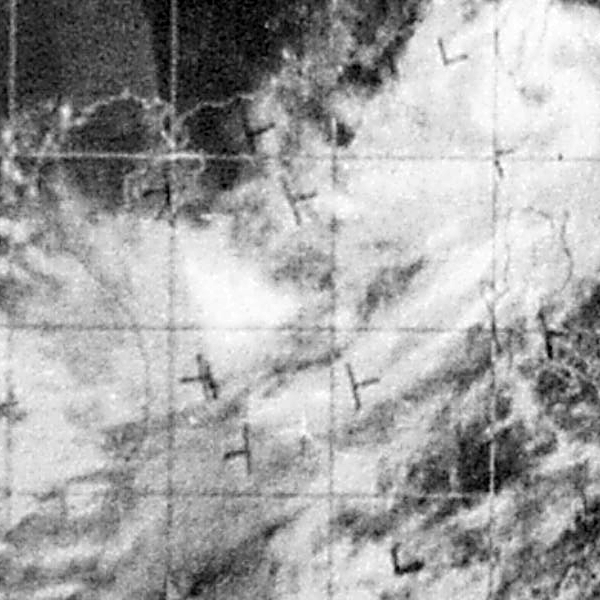
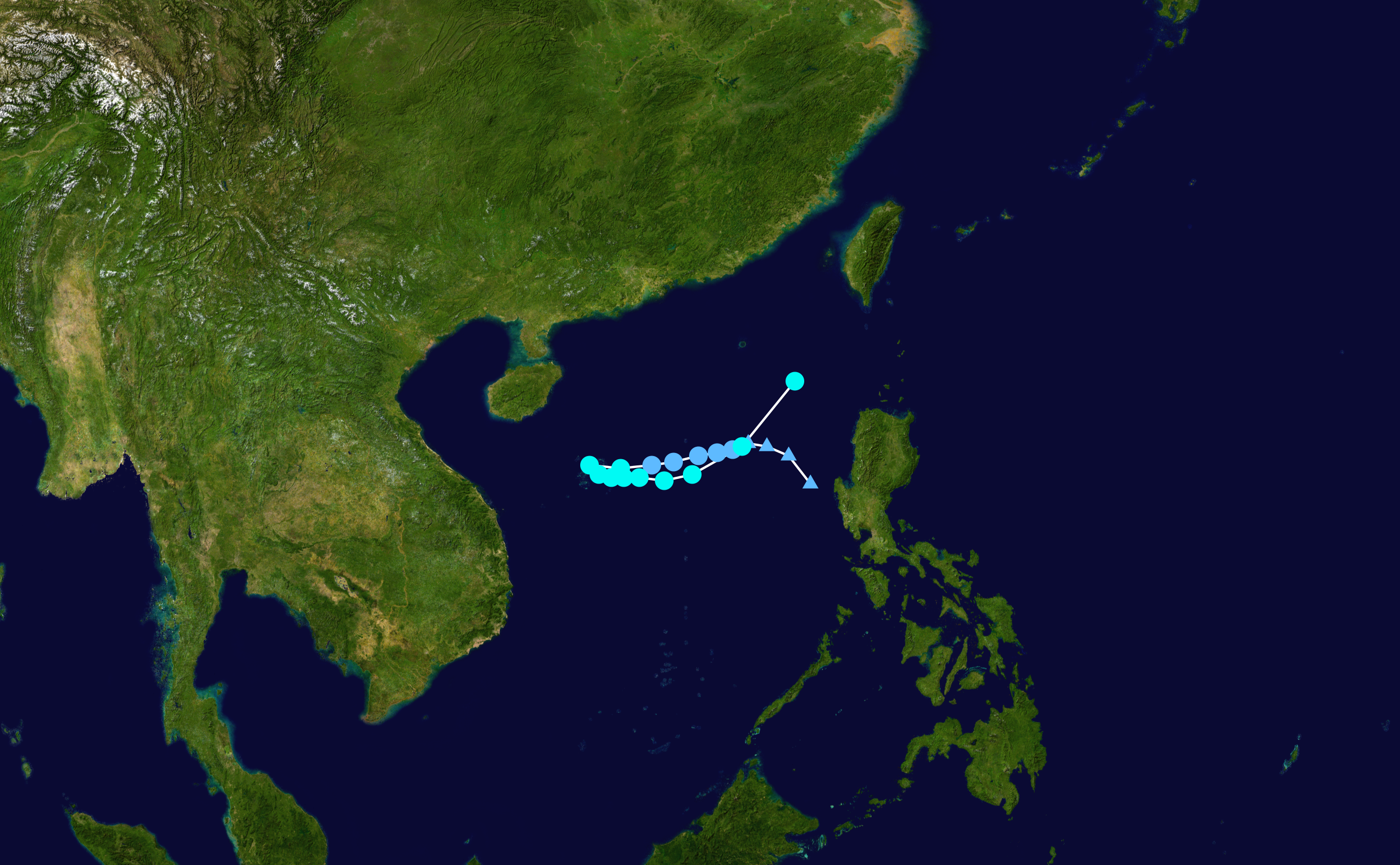
- Duration: July 21 – July 28
- Peak intensity: 85 km/h (50 mph) (1-min); 988 hPa (mbar)

Olive existed from July 21 to July 28.

=== CMA Tropical Depression 11 ===
- Tropical depression (CMA)
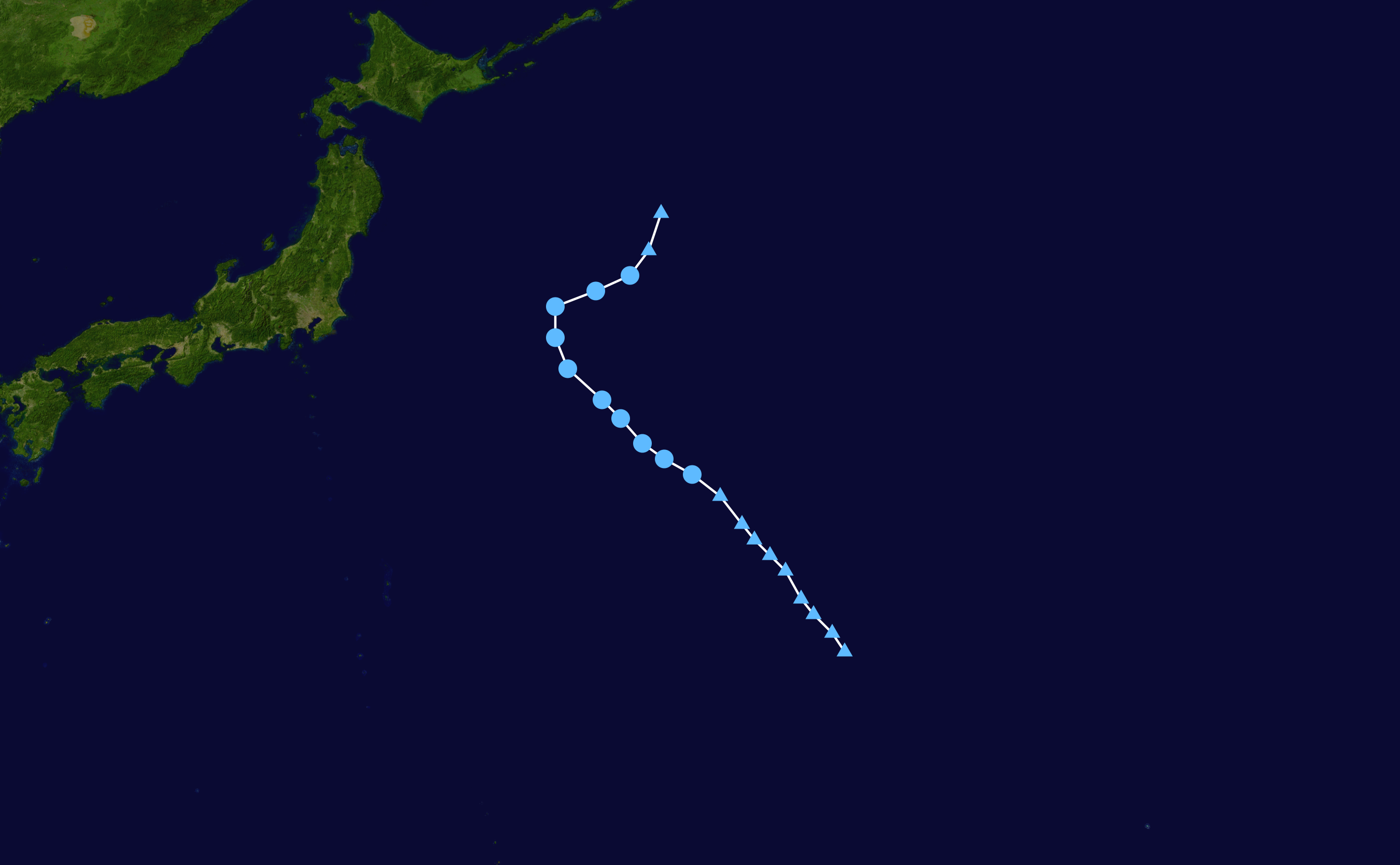
- Duration: July 29 – July 31
- Peak intensity: 55 km/h (35 mph) (10-min); 992 hPa (mbar)

The storm didn't affect land.

=== CMA Tropical Depression 12 ===
- Tropical depression (CMA)
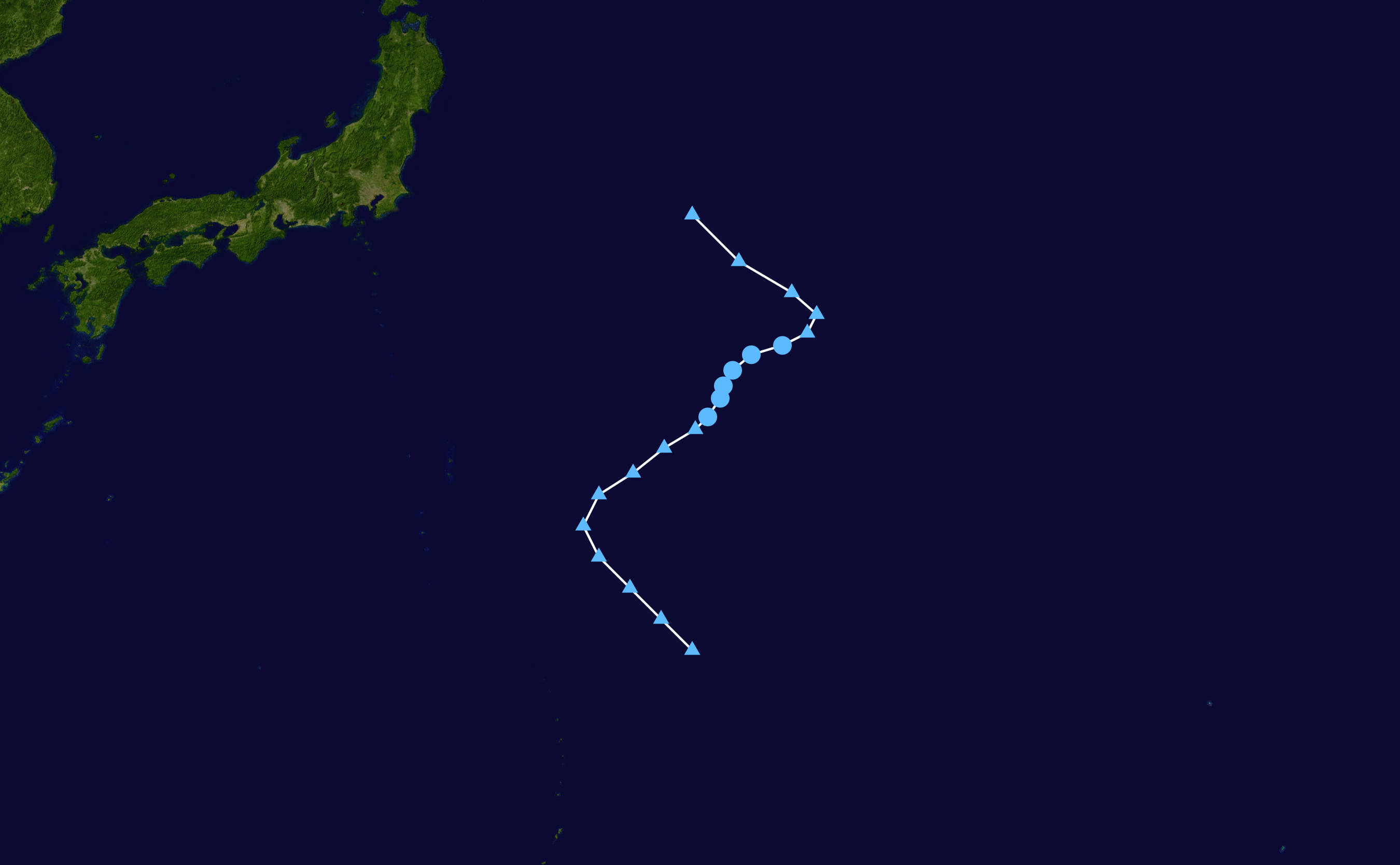
- Duration: July 30 – July 31
- Peak intensity: 55 km/h (35 mph) (10-min); 996 hPa (mbar)

The storm didn't affect land.

=== CMA Tropical Depression 13 ===
- Tropical depression (CMA)
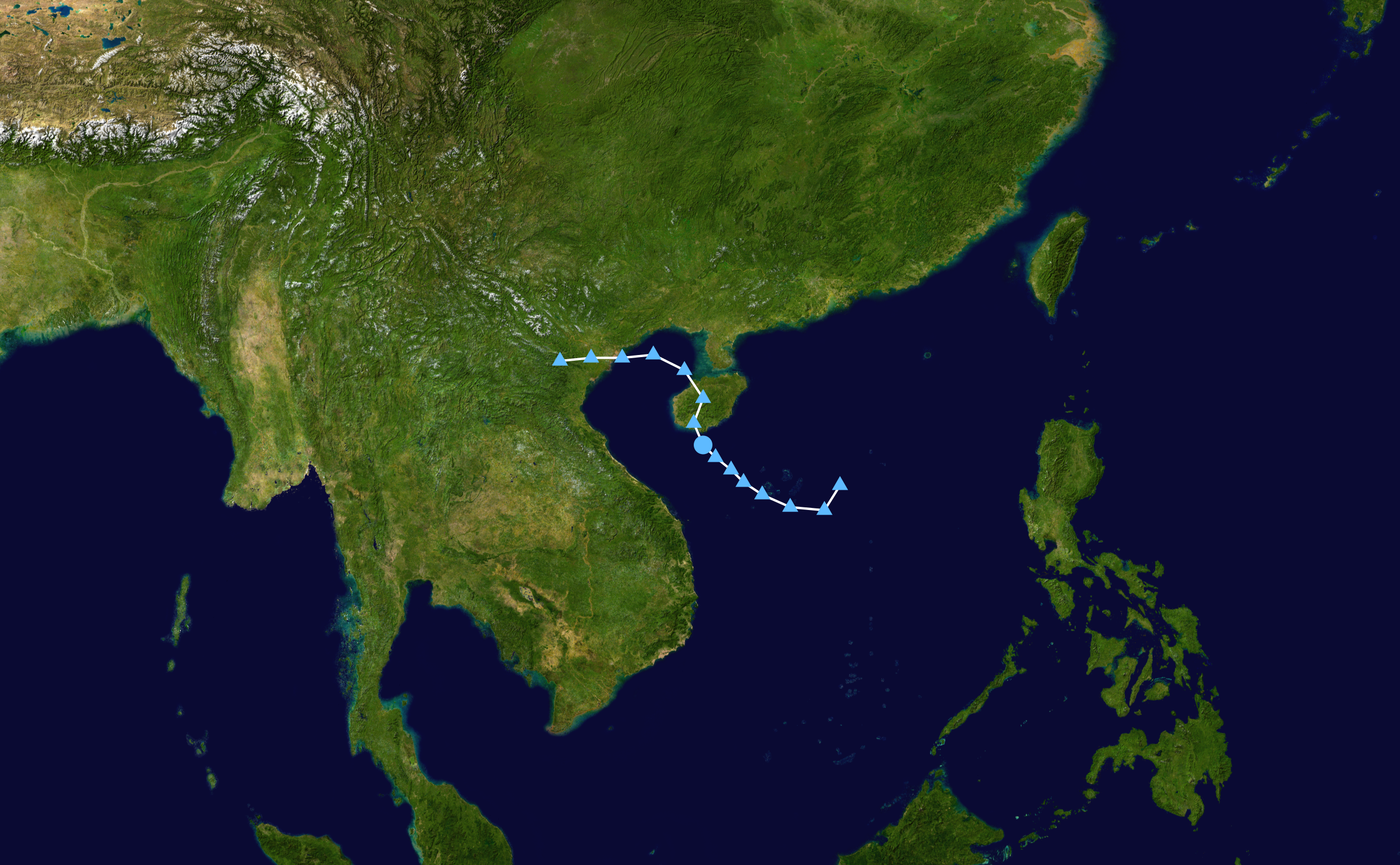
- Duration: August 3 – August 6
- Peak intensity: 45 km/h (30 mph) (10-min); 1003 hPa (mbar)

The storm hit China as a tropical depression.

=== Tropical Storm Polly ===
- Severe tropical storm (JMA)
- Tropical storm (SSHWS)
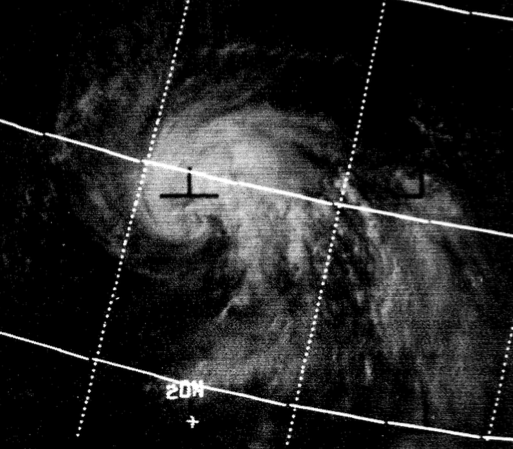
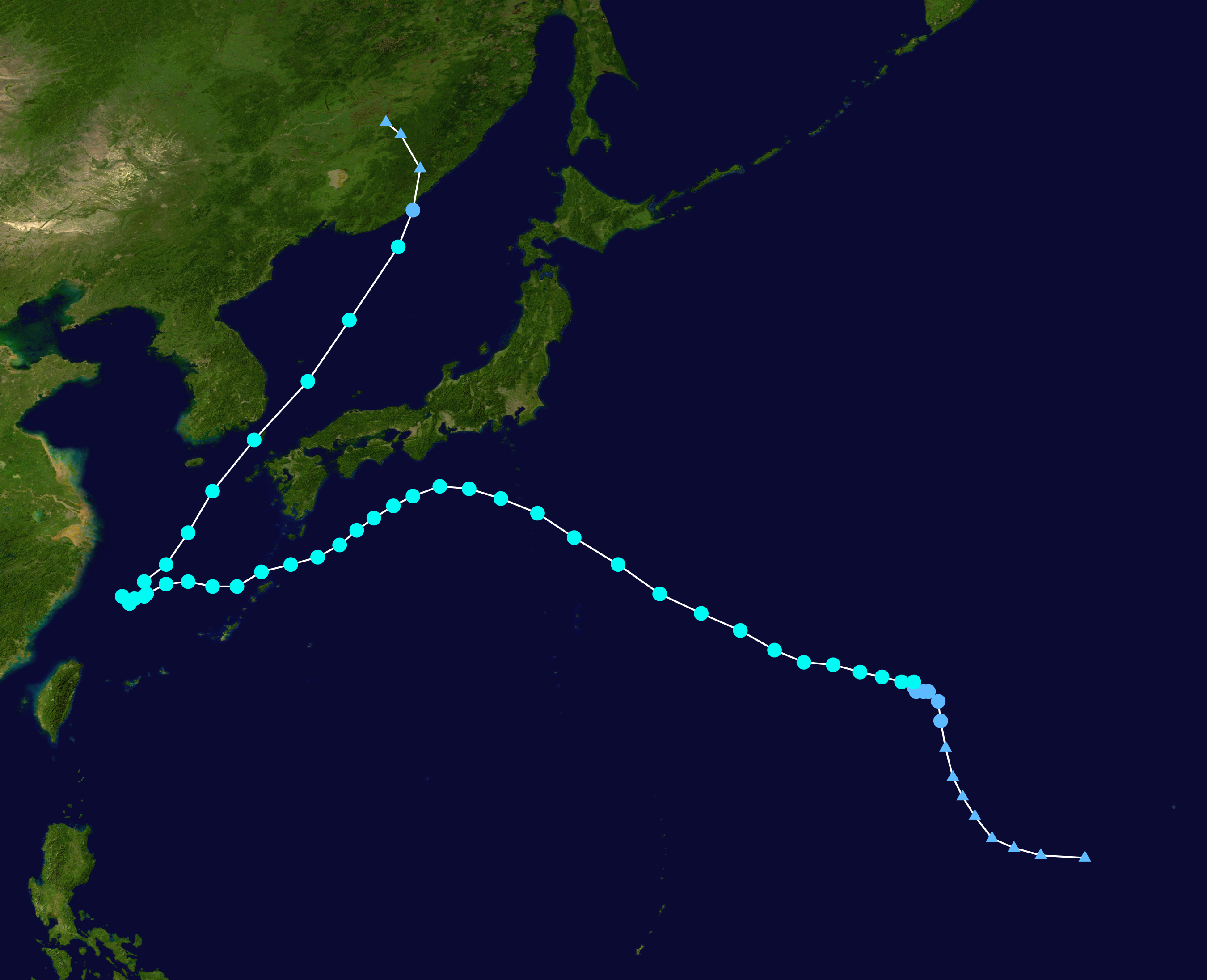
- Duration: August 3 – August 17
- Peak intensity: 100 km/h (65 mph) (1-min); 965 hPa (mbar)

Tropical Storm Polly dropped heavy rains on the southern islands of Japan. 112 people were killed and 21 were missing from the floods and landslides caused by Polly's heavy rains.

On August 18, two sightseeing buses were involved in the landslide in Shirakawa, Gifu, it fell to the Hida River, and 96 persons died and 8 persons became missing (Japanese article).

=== Tropical Depression 11W ===
- Tropical depression (JMA)
- Tropical depression (SSHWS)
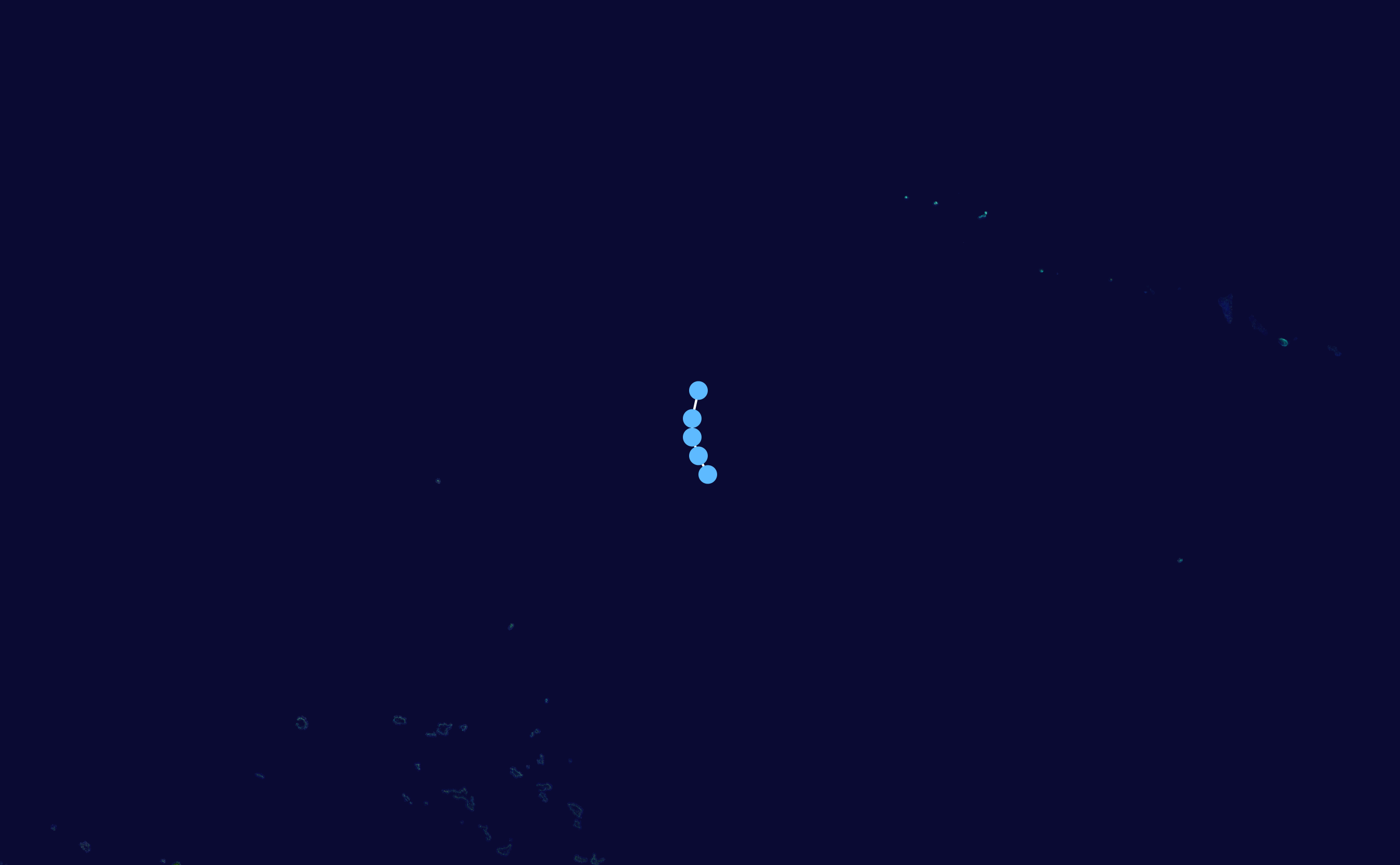
- Duration: August 7 – August 7
- Peak intensity: 35 km/h (25 mph) (10-min);

11W was a short-lived weak tropical depression.

=== Tropical Storm Rose (Gloring) ===
- Severe tropical storm (JMA)
- Tropical storm (SSHWS)
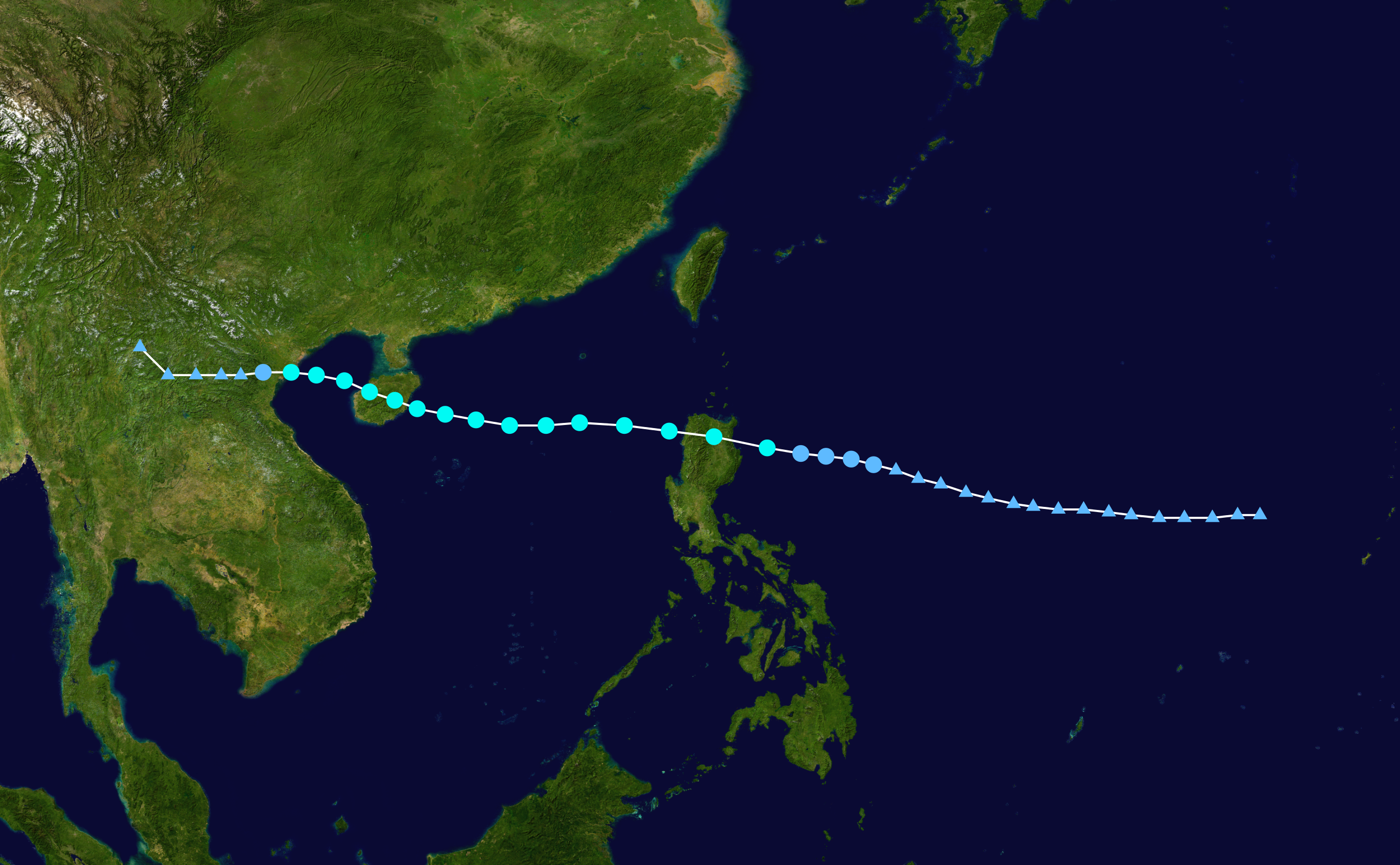
- Duration: August 9 – August 13
- Peak intensity: 110 km/h (70 mph) (1-min); 970 hPa (mbar)

Rose made landfall in the Philippines and China as a tropical storm.

=== CMA Tropical Depression 16 ===
- Tropical depression (CMA)
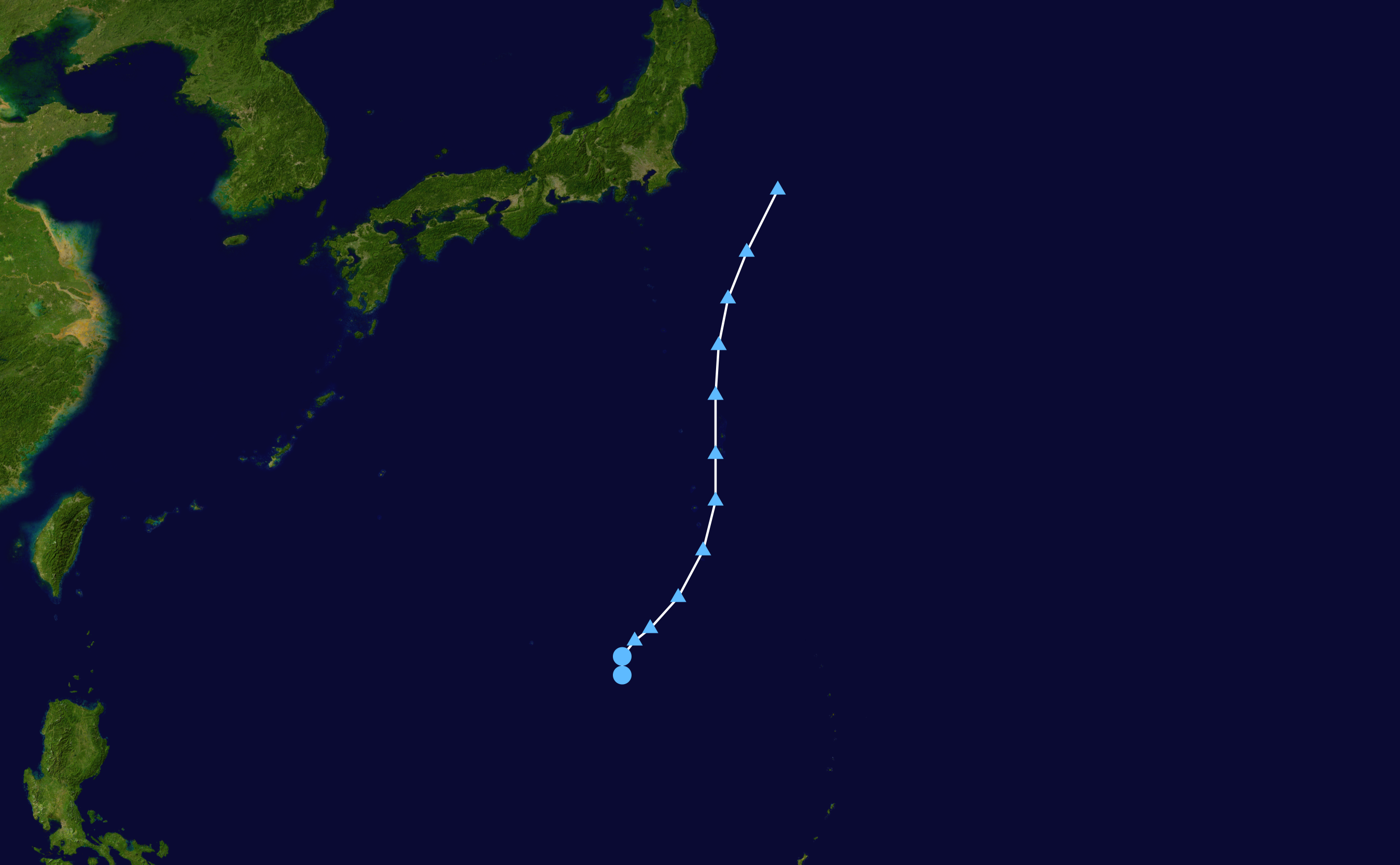
- Duration: August 9 – August 9
- Peak intensity: 35 km/h (25 mph) (10-min); 999 hPa (mbar)

The storm stayed out at sea.

=== Typhoon Shirley (Huaning) ===
- Typhoon (JMA)
- Category 1-equivalent typhoon (SSHWS)
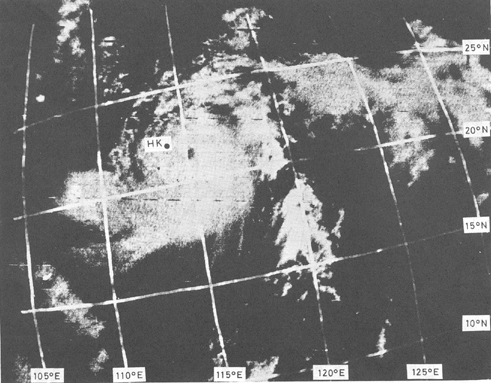
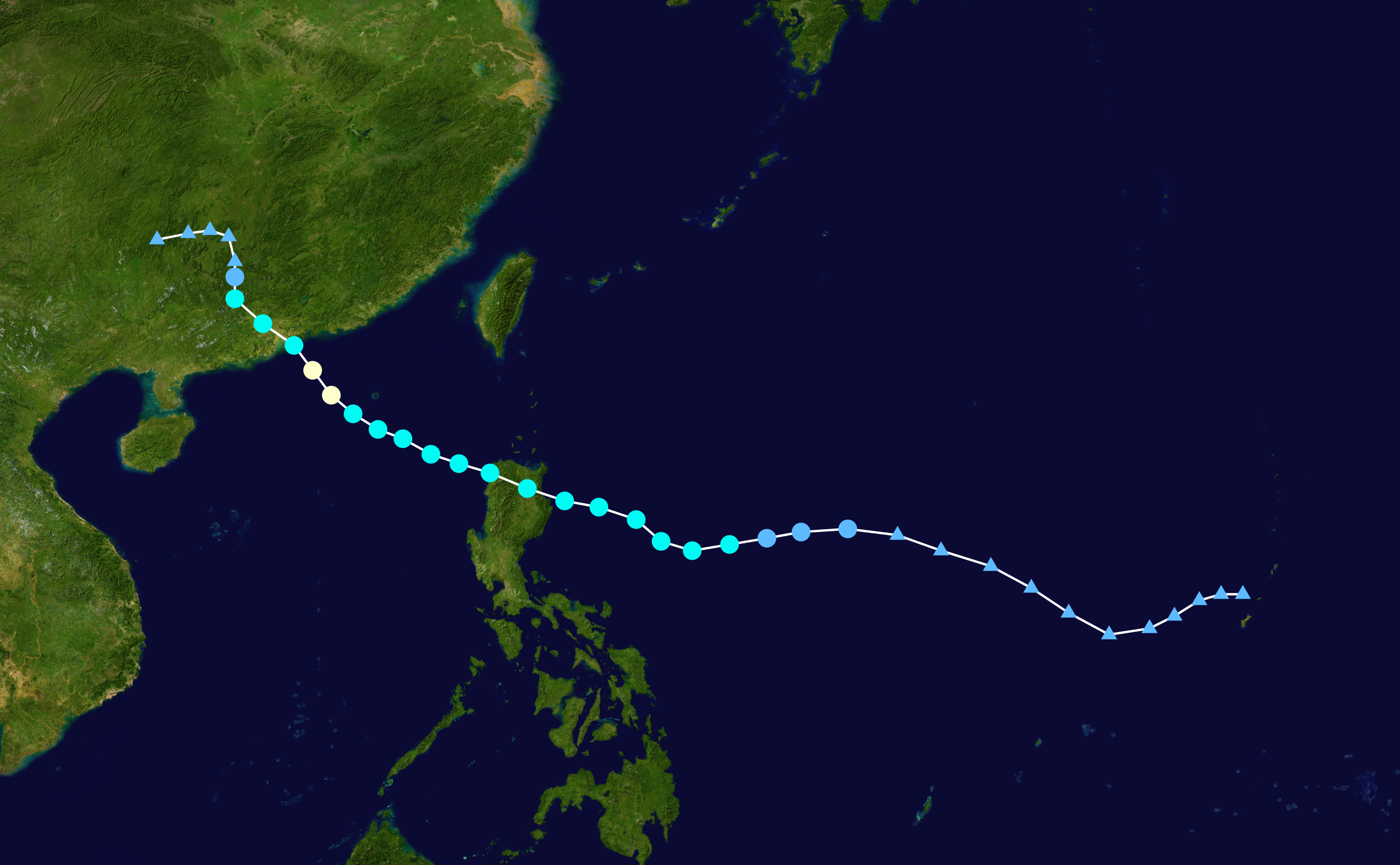
- Duration: August 14 – August 24
- Peak intensity: 120 km/h (75 mph) (1-min); 960 hPa (mbar)

Shirley hit Luzon and Hong Kong as a tropical storm.

=== Tropical Storm Trix (Iniang) ===
- Severe tropical storm (JMA)
- Tropical storm (SSHWS)
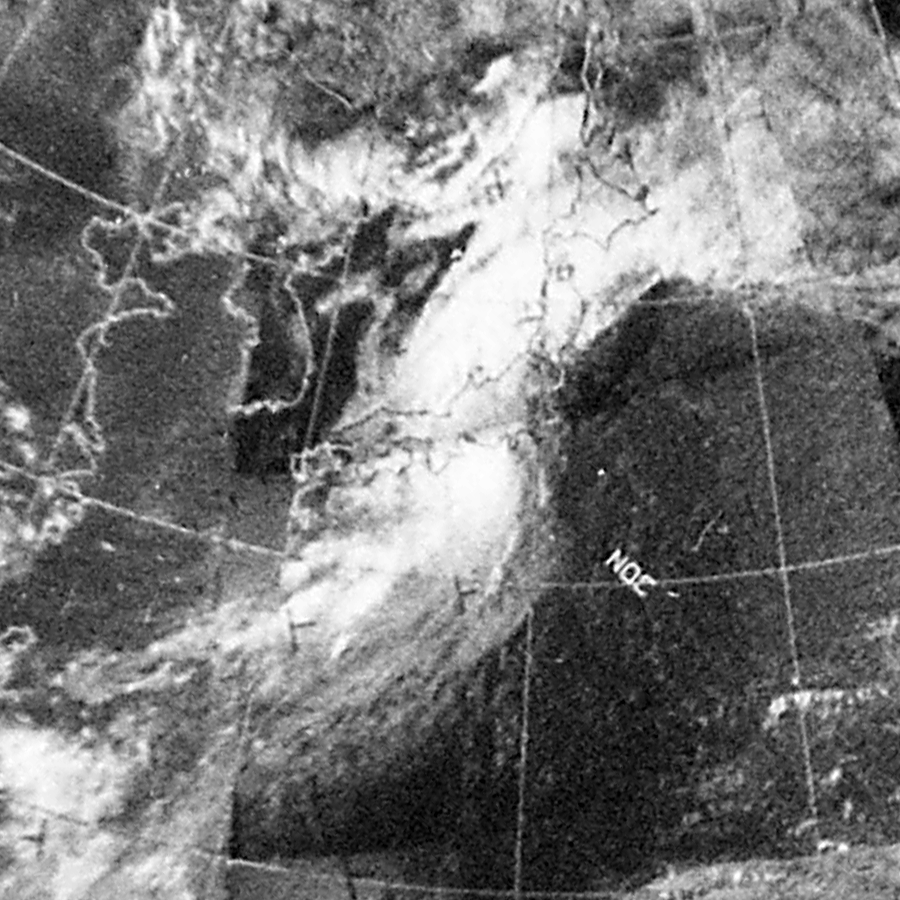
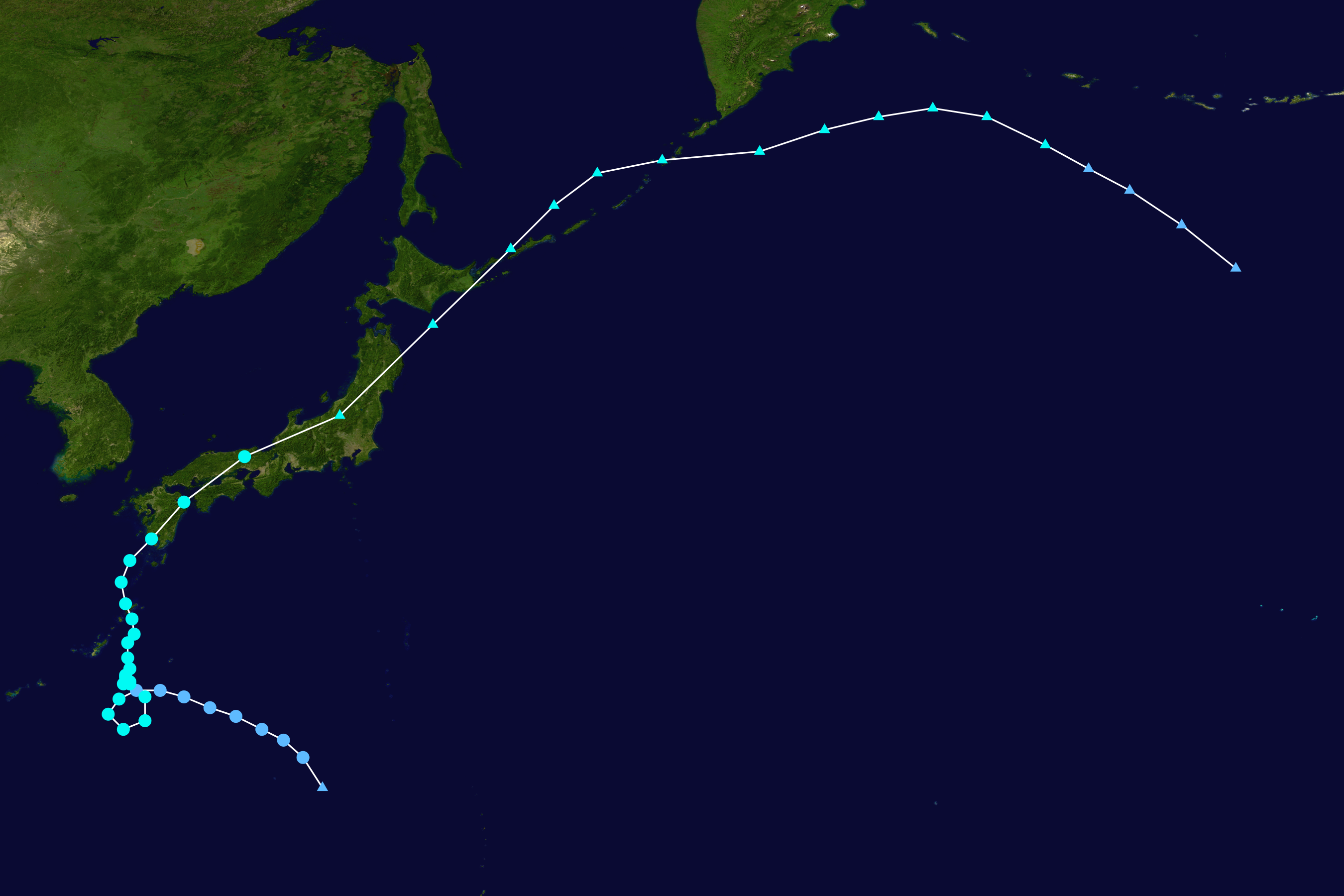
- Duration: August 22 – August 29
- Peak intensity: 100 km/h (65 mph) (1-min); 980 hPa (mbar)

Severe Tropical Storm Trix struck the southern islands of Kyūshū and Shikoku. Heavy flooding killed 25 people and left 2 missing.

=== CMA Tropical Depression 18 ===
- Tropical depression (CMA)
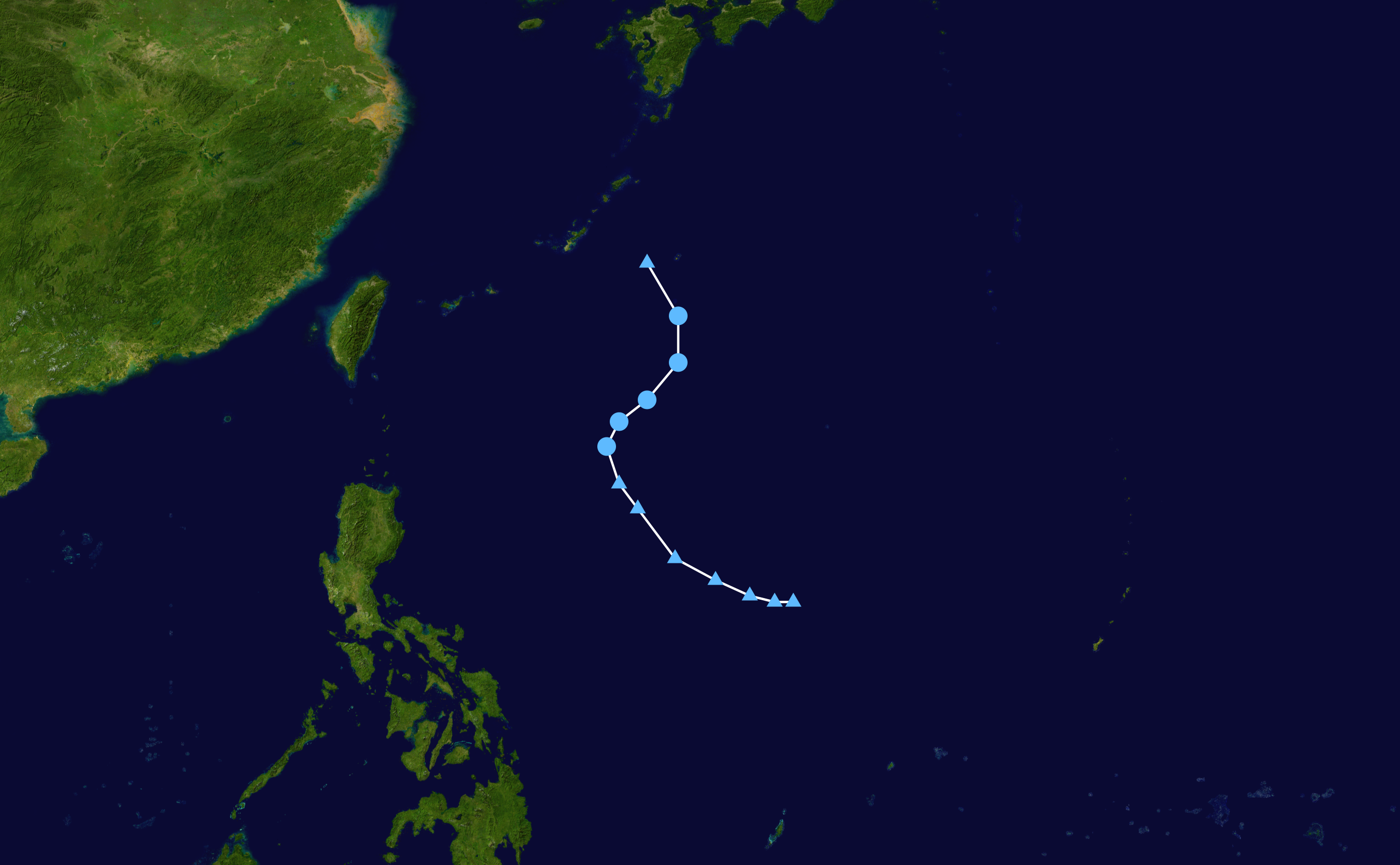
- Duration: August 23 – August 24
- Peak intensity: 45 km/h (30 mph) (10-min); 1000 hPa (mbar)

=== Tropical Storm Virginia ===
- Severe tropical storm (JMA)
- Tropical storm (SSHWS)
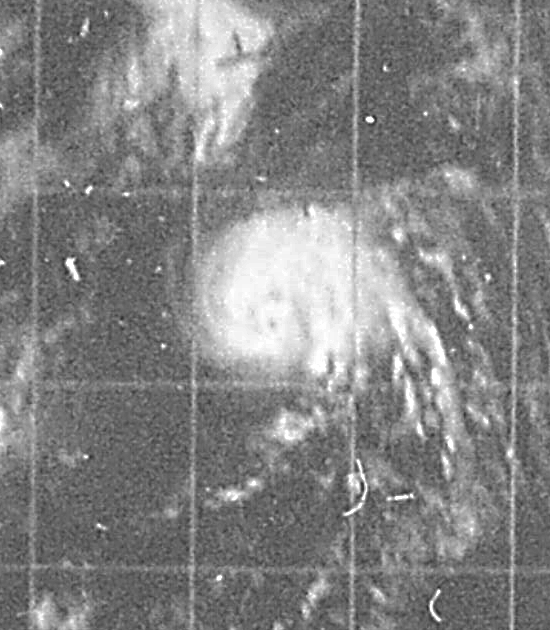
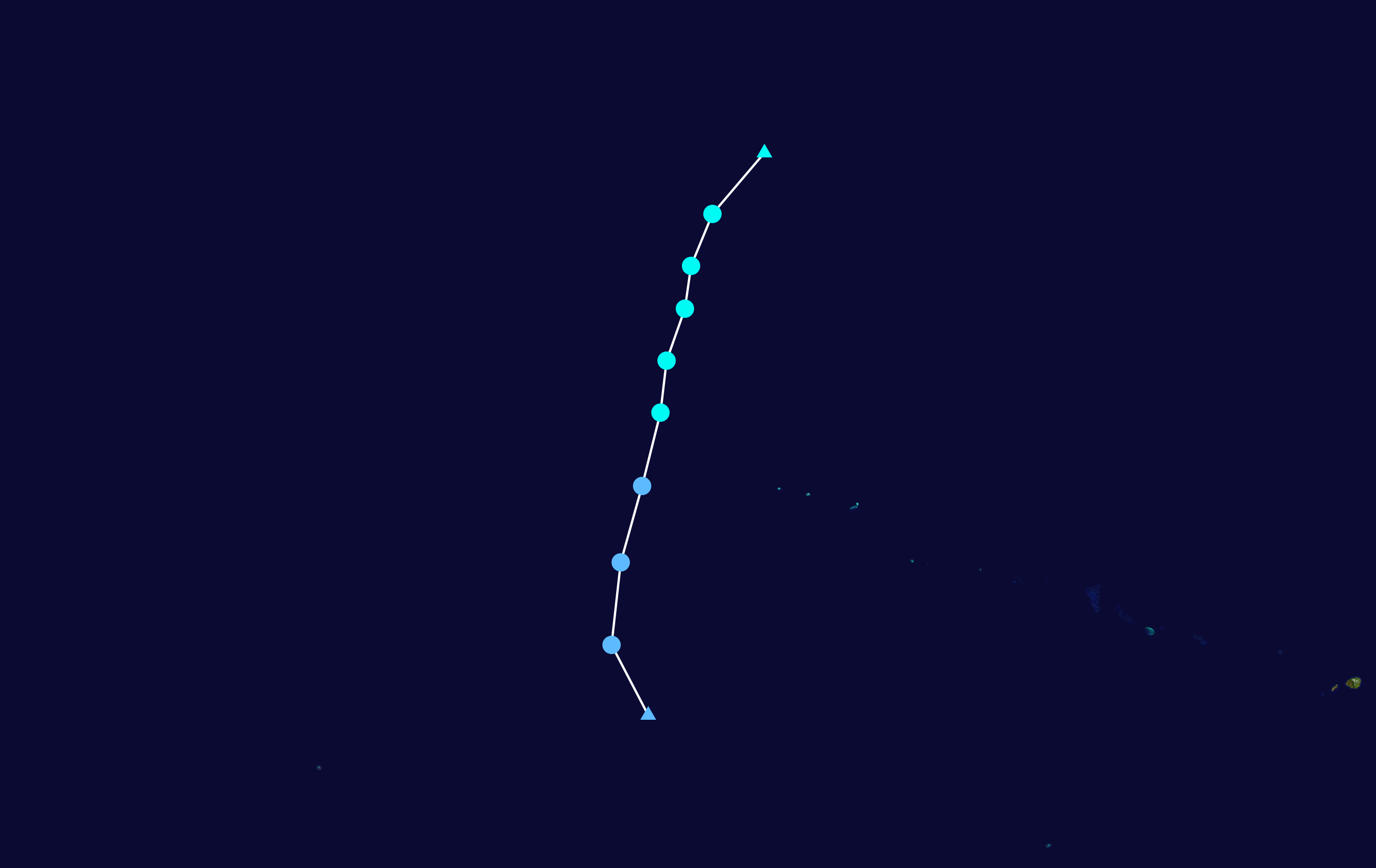
- Duration: August 24 – August 26 (exited basin)
- Peak intensity: 95 km/h (60 mph) (1-min); 990 hPa (mbar)

Virginia was first noticed near the International Date Line, about 500 kilometers (310 mi) northwest of Midway Islands. The system organized and the first advisory was issued on August 25 at 0006Z, with winds of 35 knots (40 mph). 18 hours later, Virginia crossed the date line, with winds of 50 knots (60 mph). It later became extratropical on August 27 in the Gulf of Alaska.

=== Super Typhoon Wendy (Lusing) ===
- Typhoon (JMA)
- Category 5-equivalent super typhoon (SSHWS)
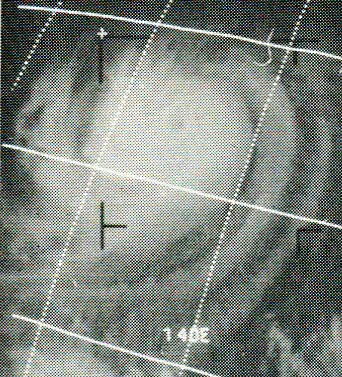
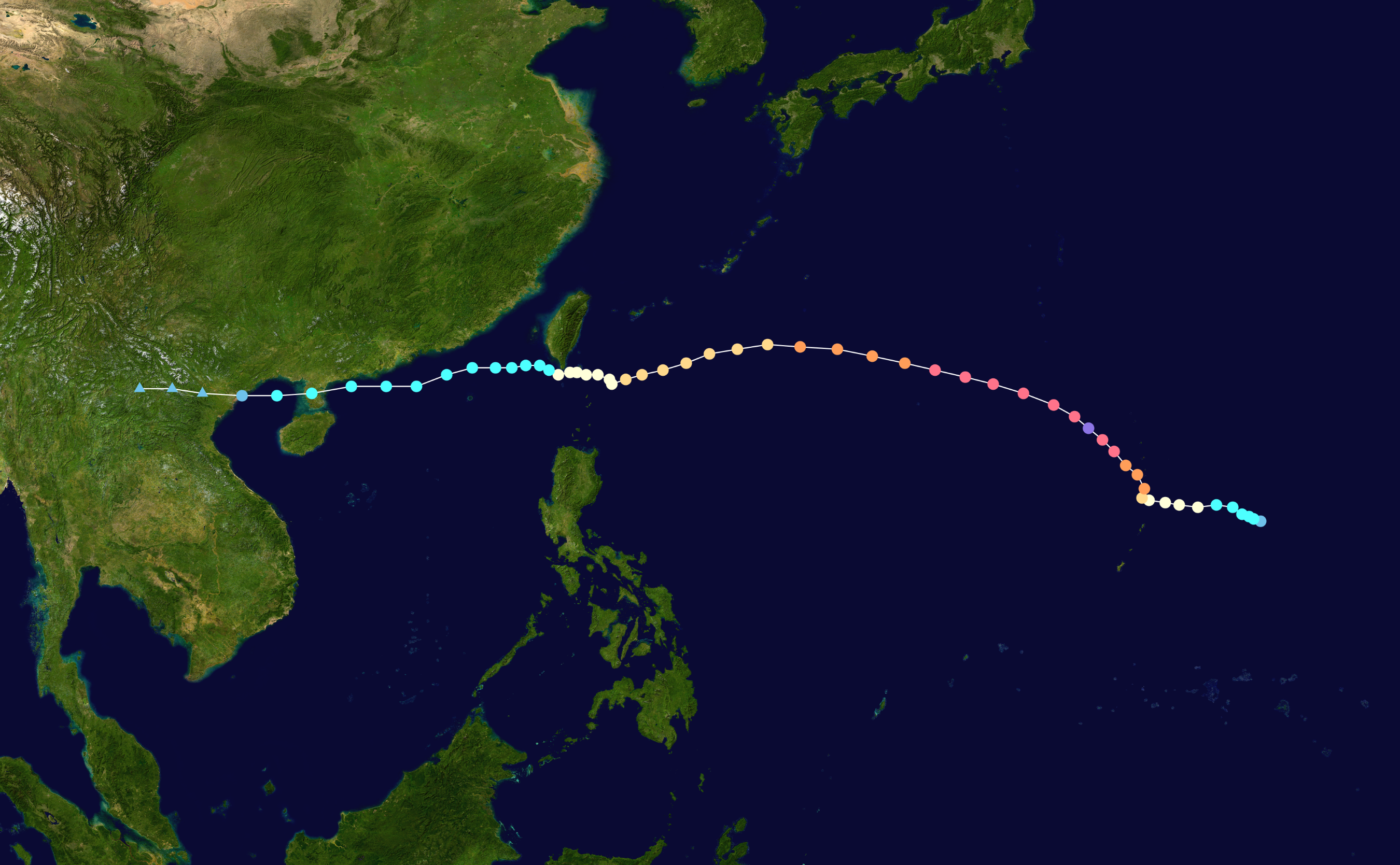
- Duration: August 27 – September 10
- Peak intensity: 260 km/h (160 mph) (1-min); 920 hPa (mbar)

Tropical Storm Wendy, which formed on August 28 in the open Western Pacific, quickly intensified to a peak of 160 mph winds on the 31st. It steadily weakened as it moved westward, and passed by southern Taiwan on September 5 as a minimal typhoon. Wendy continued to weaken, and after crossing the South China Sea, Wendy dissipated over northern Vietnam on the 9th.

A weather station in Phù Liễn (Hải Phòng) recorded wind gusts reaching up to 205 km/h or even higher, exceeding the measuring capacity of the anemometer. In Hải Phòng alone, the storm caused 155 deaths and injured 400 people.

=== Super Typhoon Agnes ===
- Typhoon (JMA)
- Category 5-equivalent super typhoon (SSHWS)
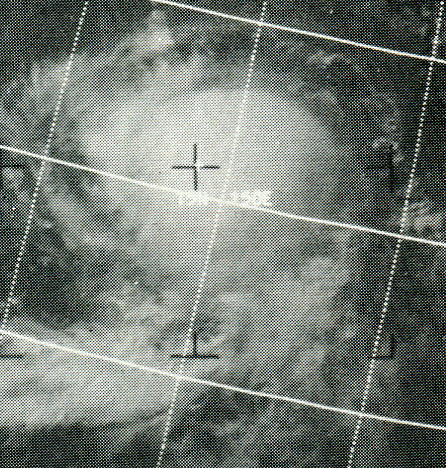
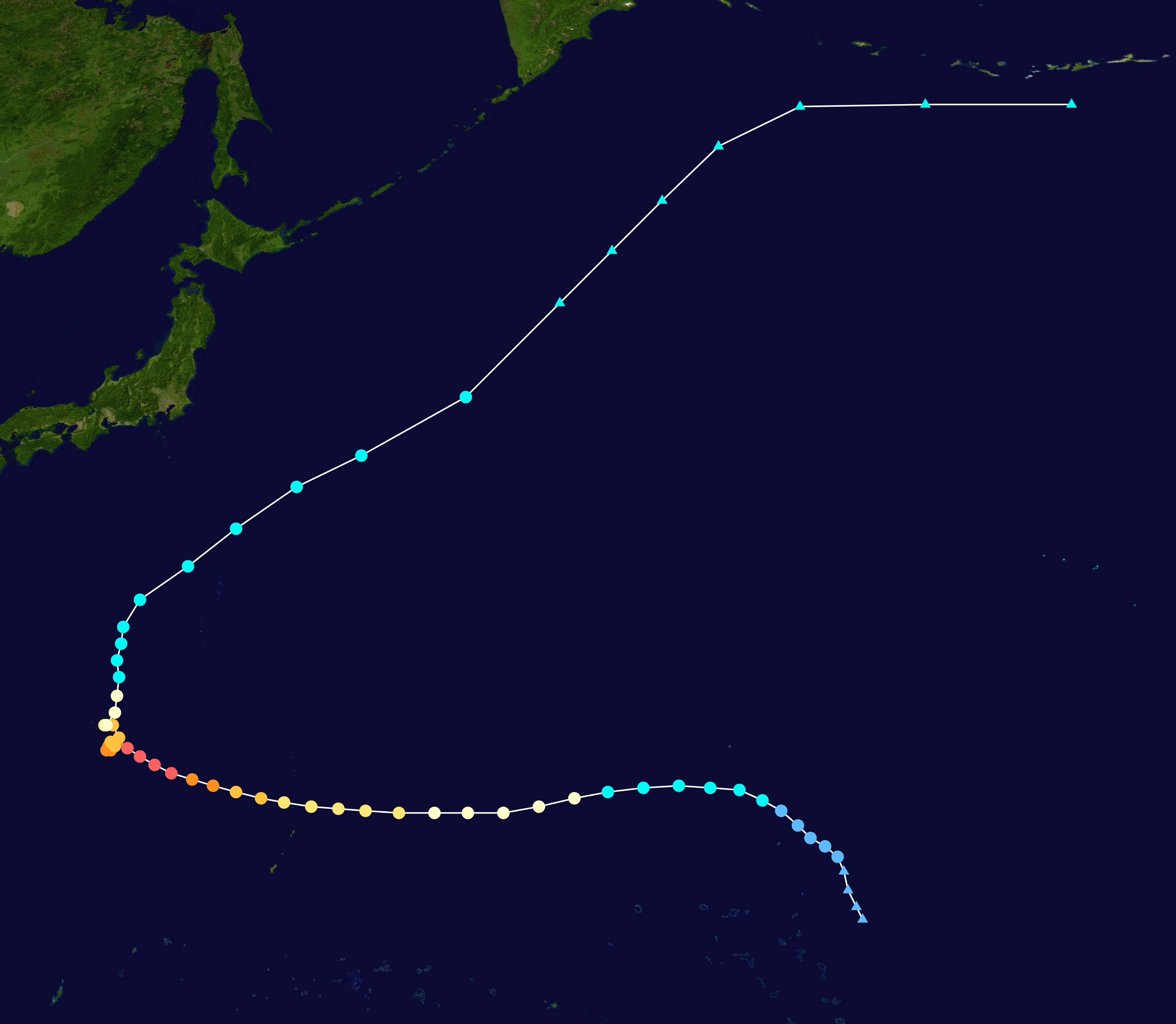
- Duration: August 27 – September 10
- Peak intensity: 280 km/h (175 mph) (1-min); 900 hPa (mbar)

Typhoon Agnes originated as a low-pressure area in the western Pacific on August 27. Initially classified as a tropical disturbance, it tracked west-northwestward, intensifying into a tropical depression by August 28 and reaching tropical storm status by August 29 near the Marshall Islands. Agnes underwent rapid intensify between September 2–3, achieving super typhoon status with 1-minute sustained winds of 175 mph (280 km/h) and a lowest central pressure of 900 hPa, making it the most intense storm of the 1968 Pacific season. During this phase, it followed a west-northwest trajectory across the Philippine Sea, accelerating to speeds of 24.7 km/h. By September 4, Agnes began recurving northeastward south of Japan, and weakened to a Category 1 typhoon by September 7. It transitioned into an extratropical cyclone northeast of Japan on September 10 and fully dissipated over the North Pacific on September 11.

=== Typhoon Bess ===
- Typhoon (JMA)
- Category 1-equivalent typhoon (SSHWS)
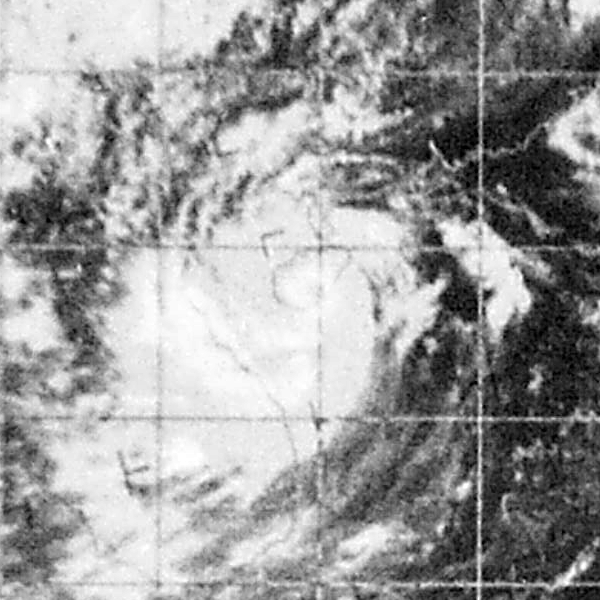
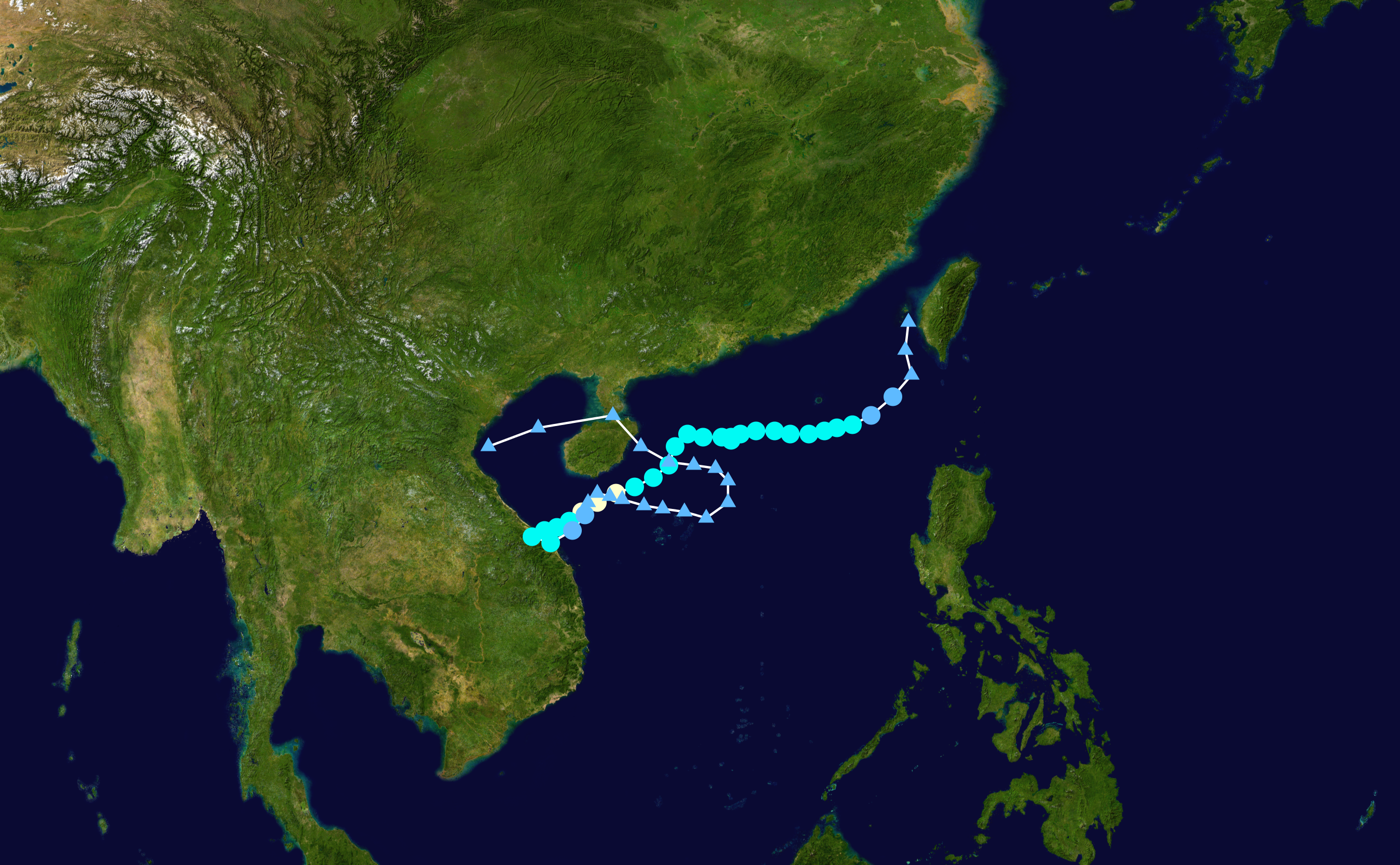
- Duration: August 31 – September 10
- Peak intensity: 120 km/h (75 mph) (1-min); 965 hPa (mbar)

Bess was a Category 1 typhoon that hit China.

=== CMA Tropical Depression 24 ===
- Tropical depression (CMA)
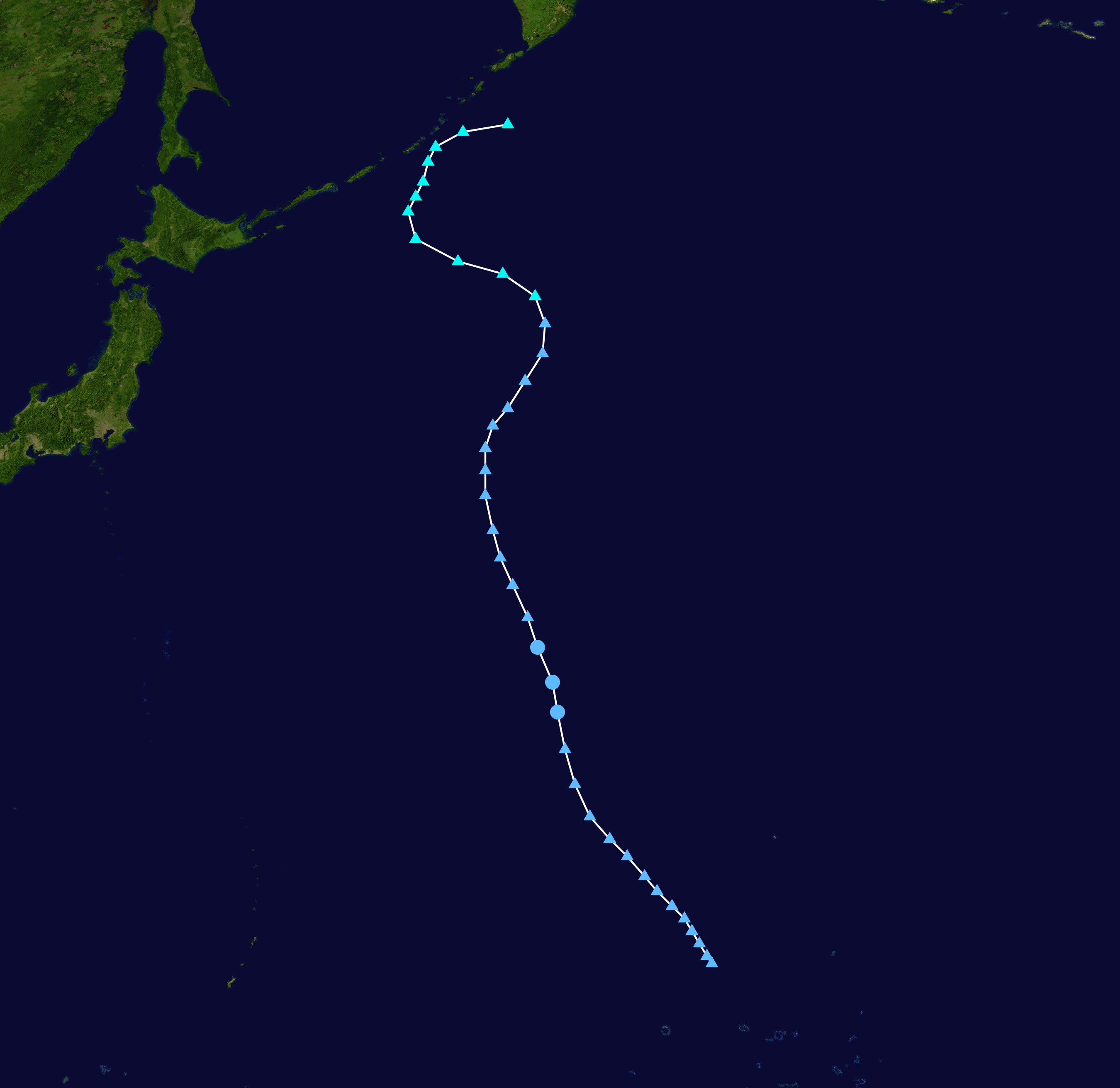
- Duration: September 2 – September 11
- Peak intensity: 55 km/h (35 mph) (10-min); 990 hPa (mbar)

=== Typhoon Carmen ===
- Typhoon (JMA)
- Category 3-equivalent typhoon (SSHWS)
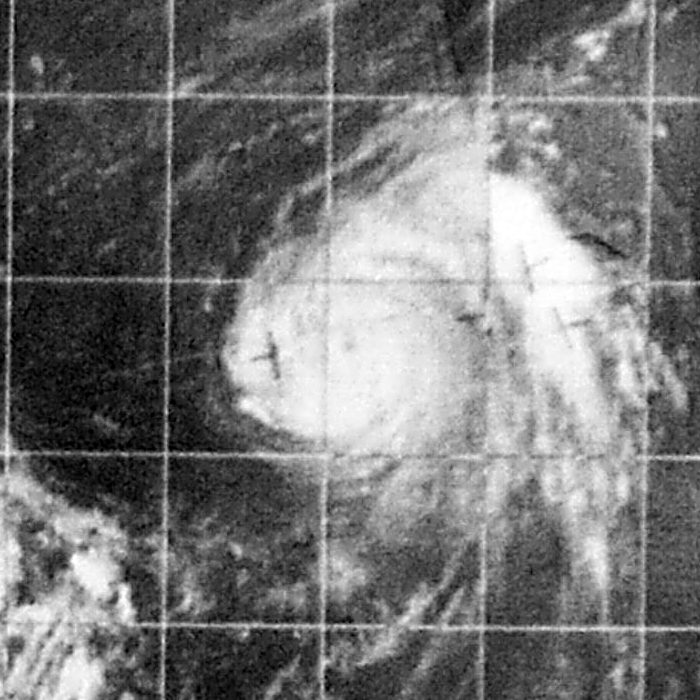
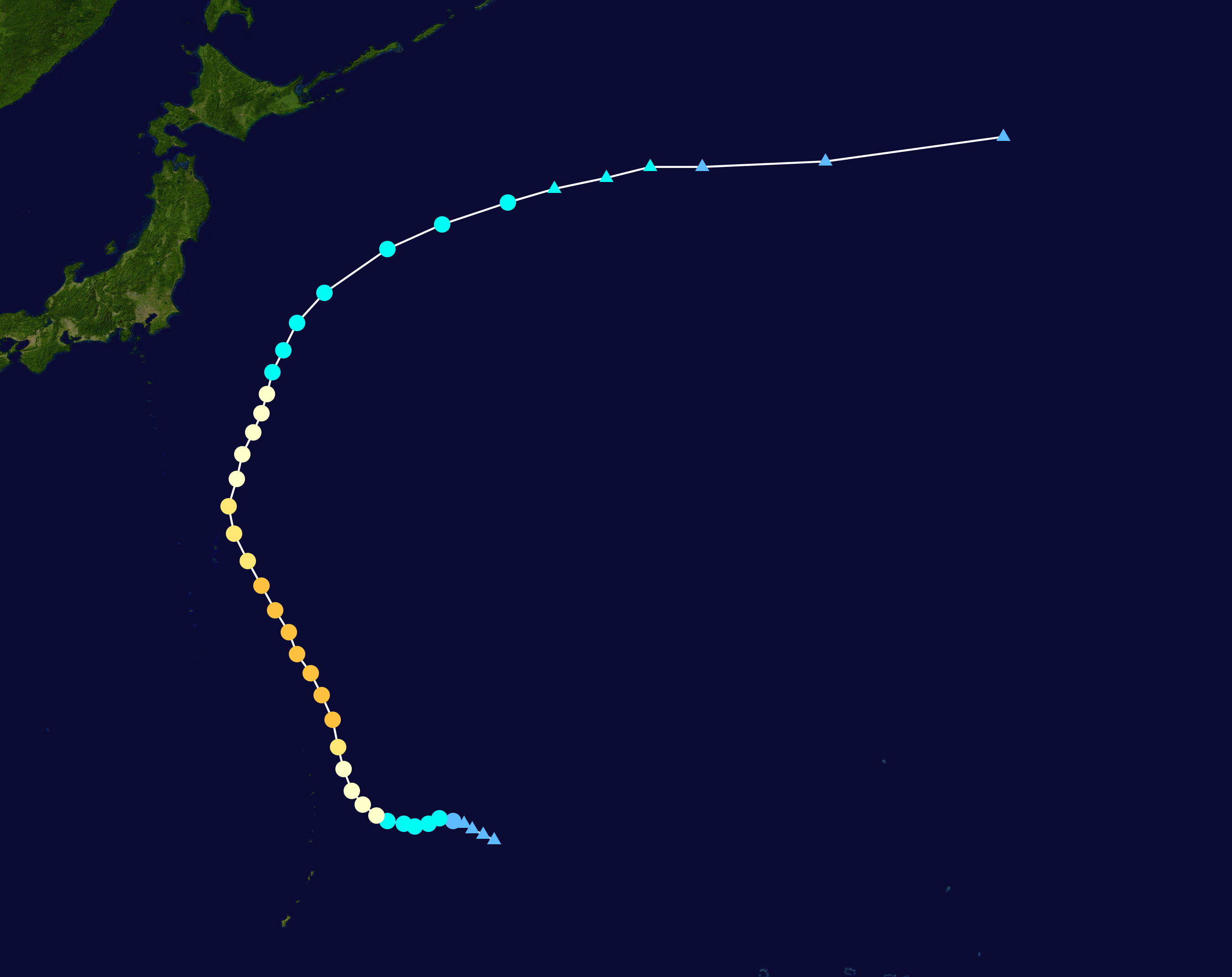
- Duration: September 15 – September 24
- Peak intensity: 205 km/h (125 mph) (1-min); 935 hPa (mbar)

Carmen was a category 3 typhoon that didn't affect land.

=== Typhoon Della (Maring) ===
- Typhoon (JMA)
- Category 4-equivalent typhoon (SSHWS)
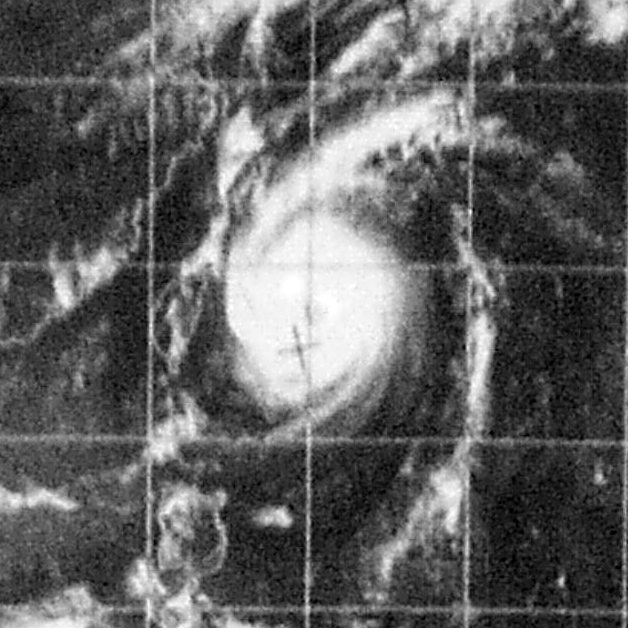
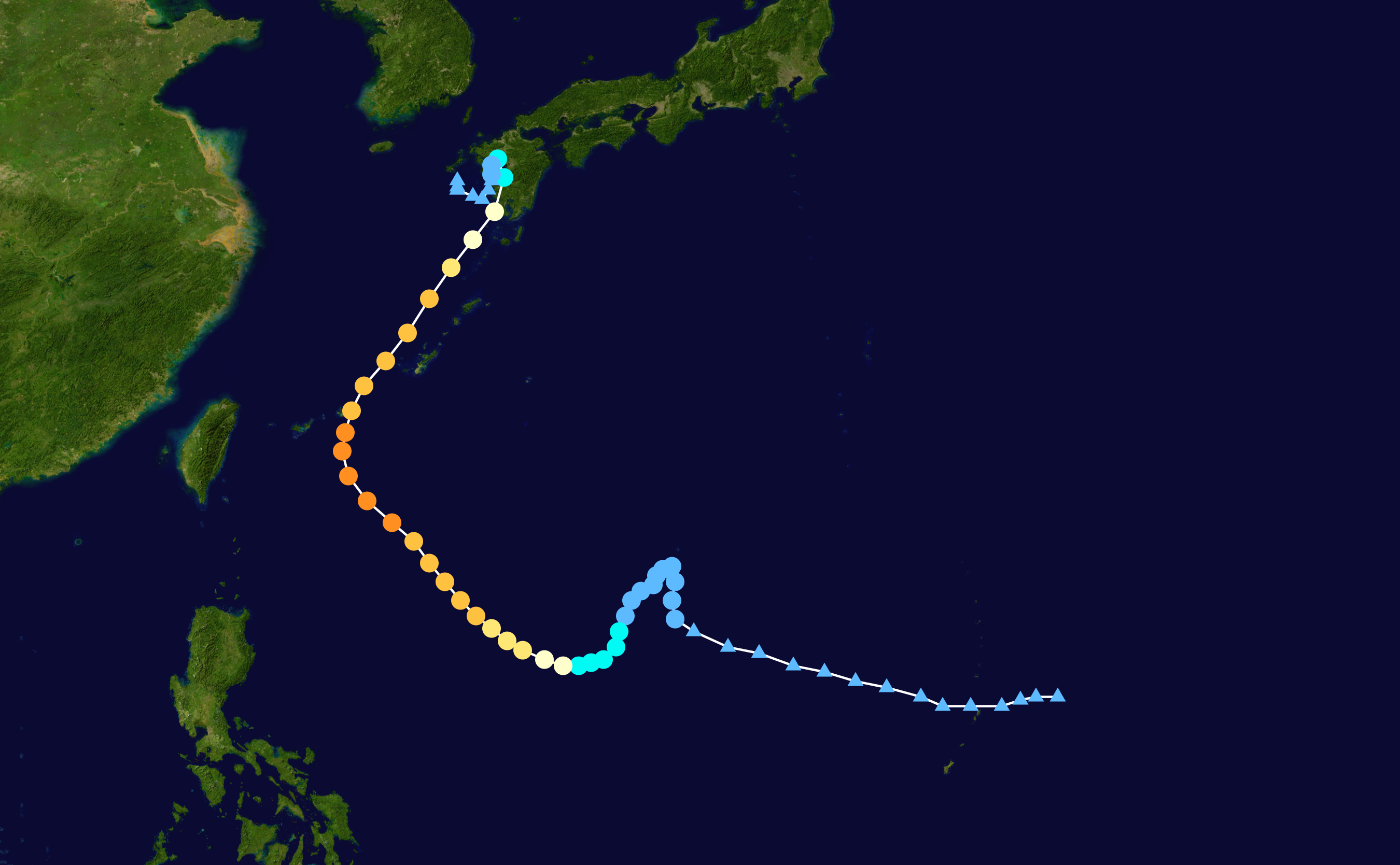
- Duration: September 11 – September 25
- Peak intensity: 220 km/h (140 mph) (1-min); 930 hPa (mbar)

Typhoon Della struck Kyūshū Island in southern Japan with winds of 100 mph. Della killed 11 throughout southern Japan.

=== Super Typhoon Elaine (Nitang) ===
- Typhoon (JMA)
- Category 5-equivalent super typhoon (SSHWS)
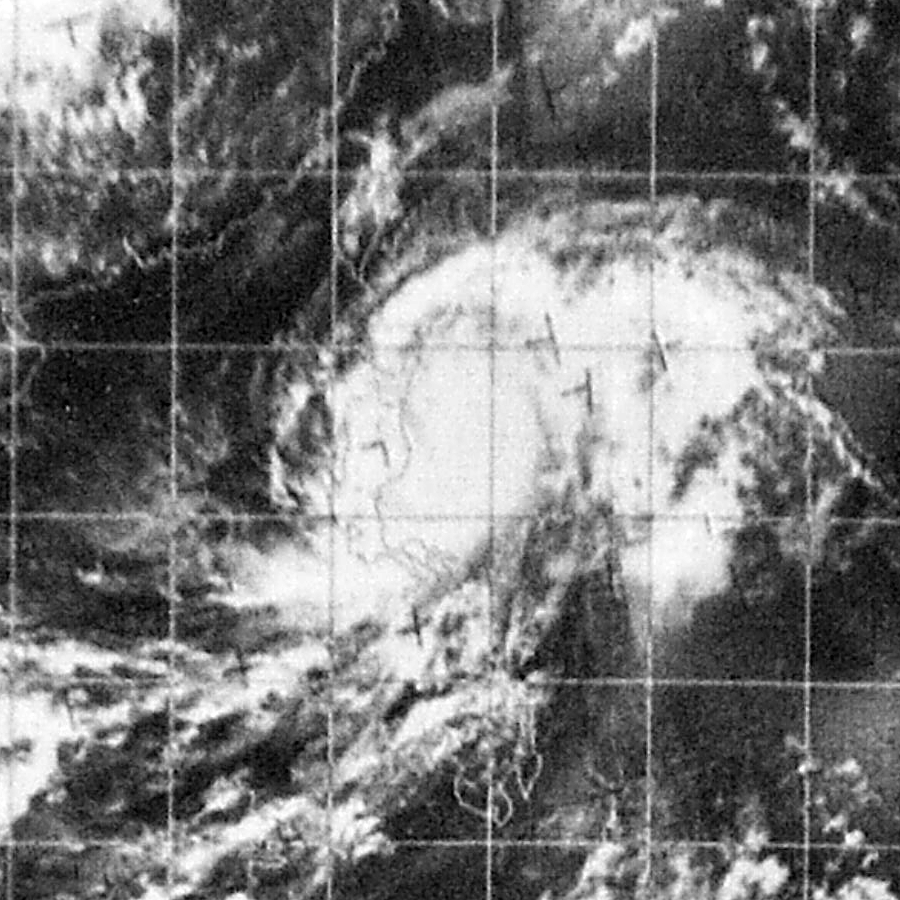
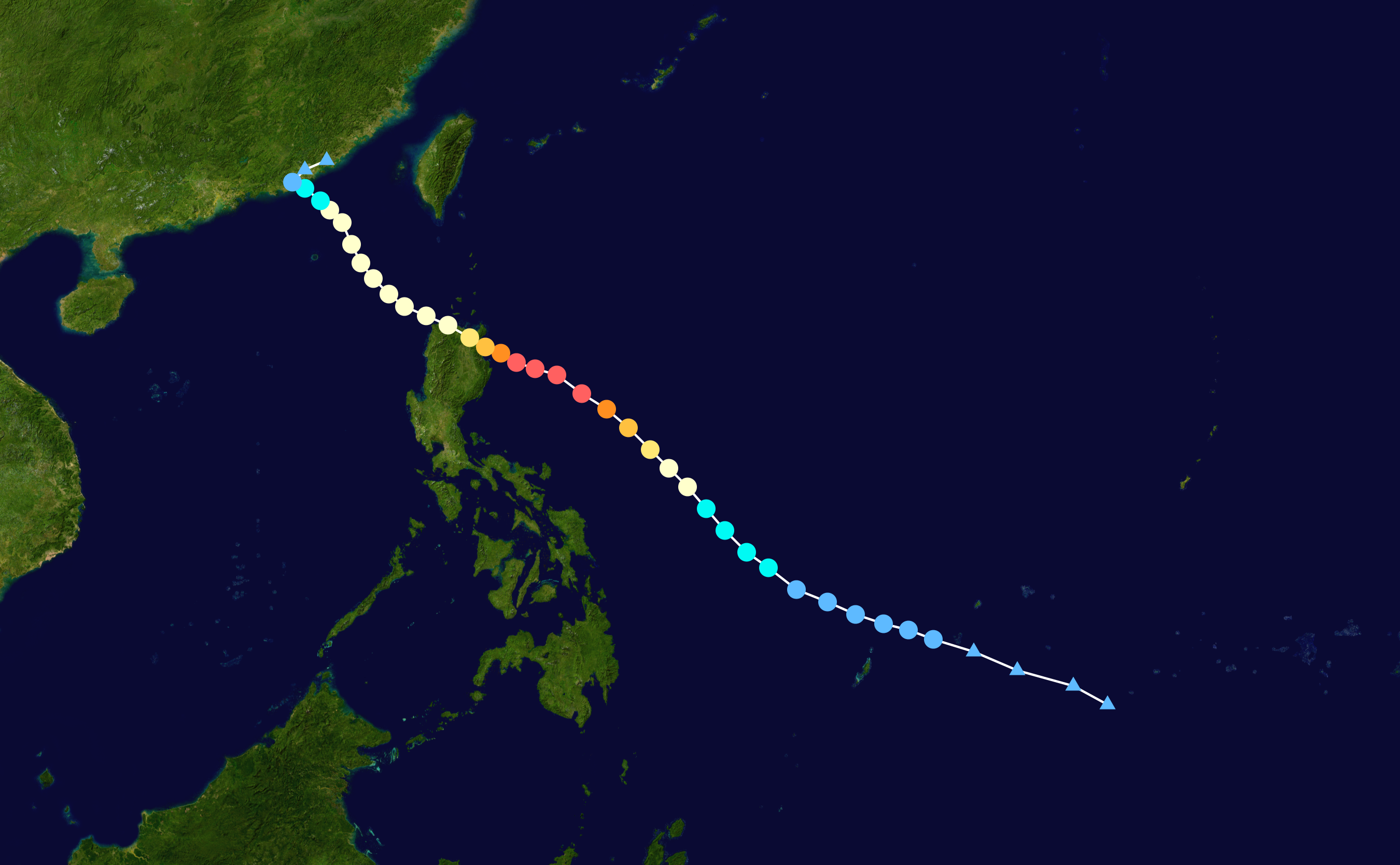
- Duration: September 22 – October 2
- Peak intensity: 280 km/h (175 mph) (1-min); 910 hPa (mbar)

Super Typhoon Elaine, after peaking at 175 mph winds, weakened to hit extreme northern Luzon on September 28 as a 130 mph typhoon. It continued to the northwest, and after hitting southeastern China as a minimal tropical storm Elaine dissipated on October 1.

=== Super Typhoon Faye ===
- Typhoon (JMA)
- Category 5-equivalent super typhoon (SSHWS)
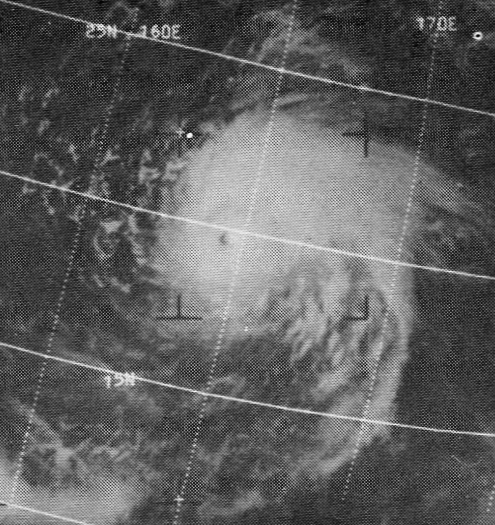
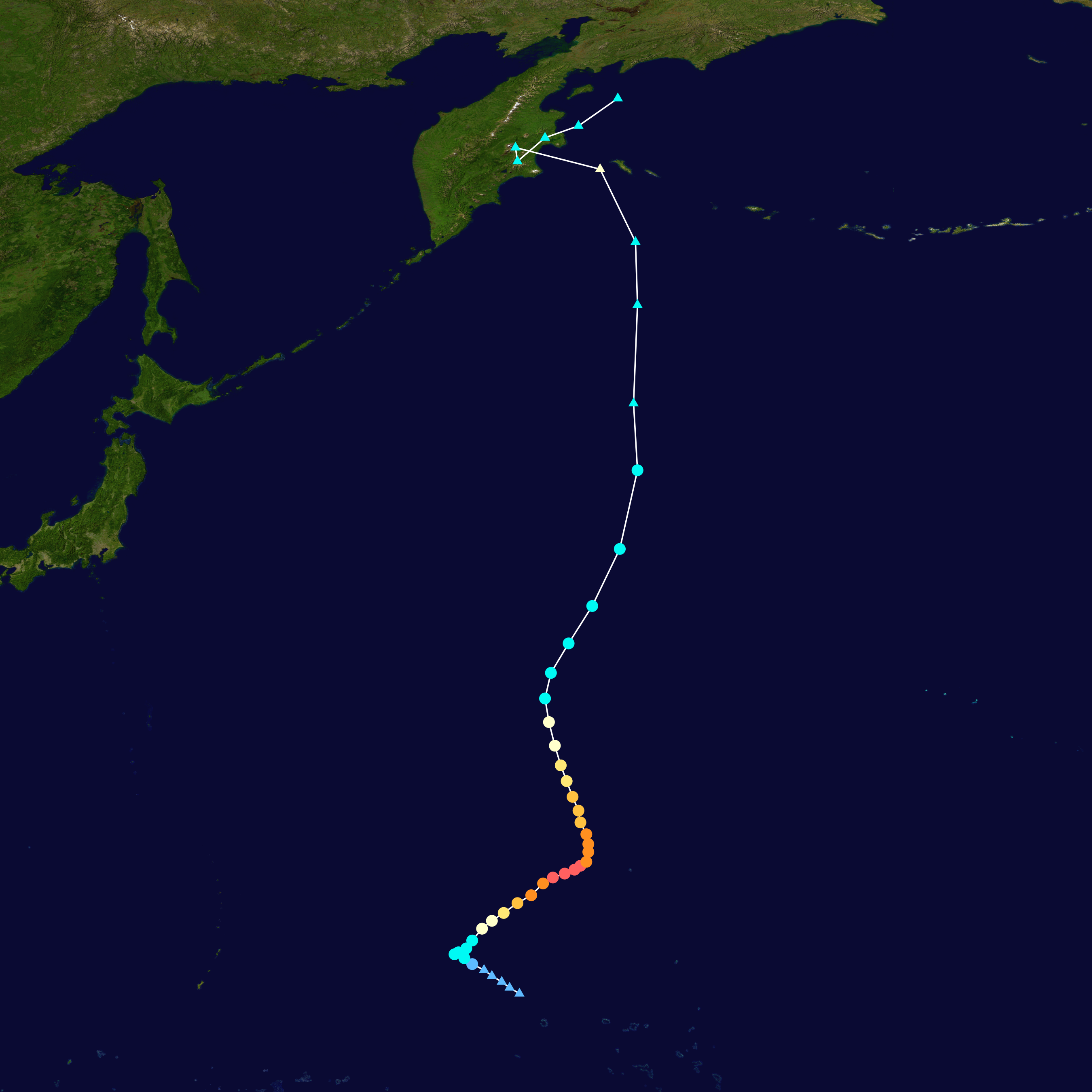
- Duration: September 30 – October 10
- Peak intensity: 270 km/h (165 mph) (1-min); 915 hPa (mbar)

Faye was a Category 5 super typhoon that didn't make landfall.

=== Typhoon Gloria (Osang) ===
- Typhoon (JMA)
- Category 2-equivalent typhoon (SSHWS)
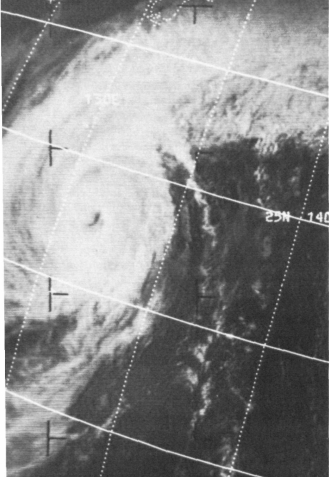
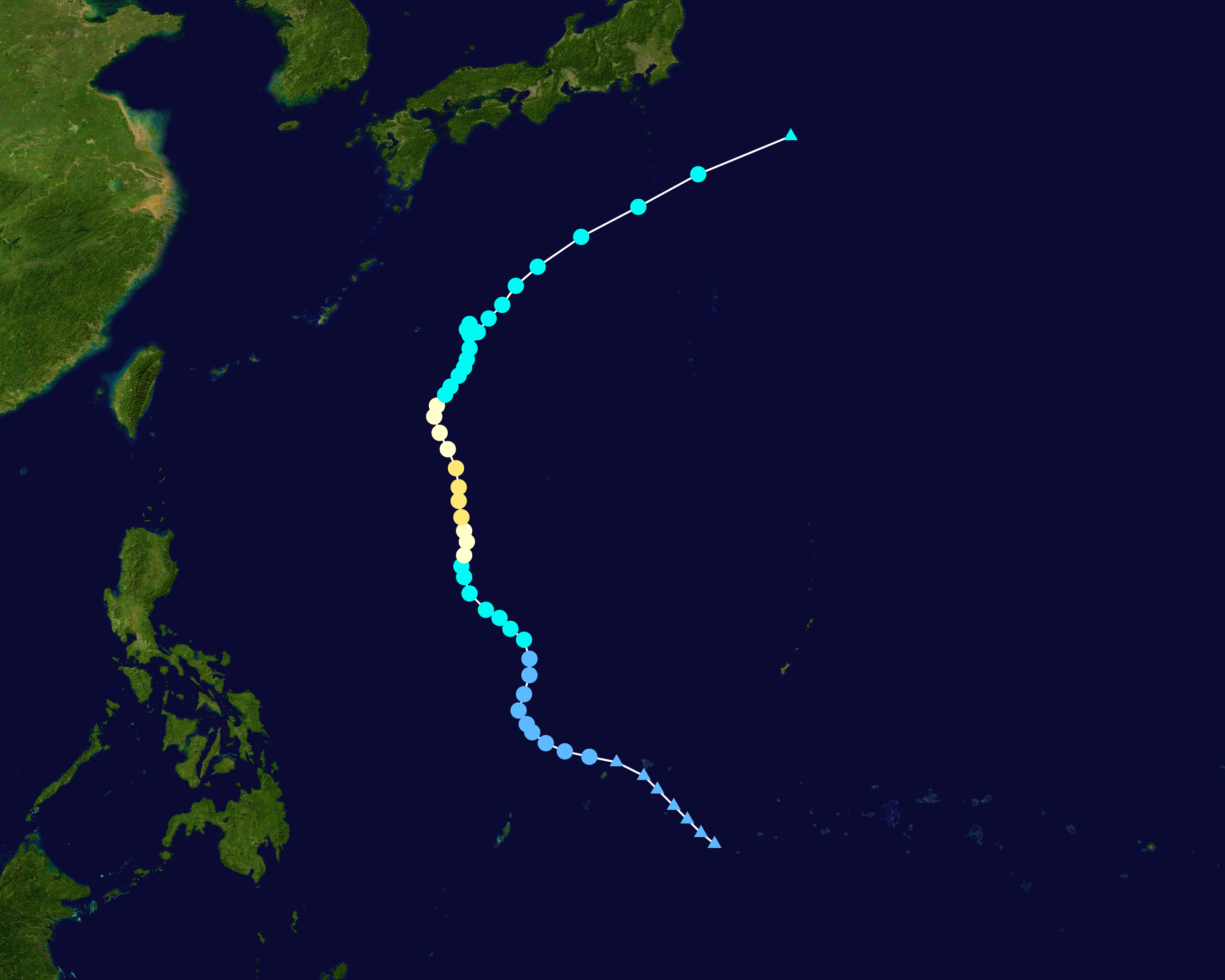
- Duration: October 12 – October 24
- Peak intensity: 165 km/h (105 mph) (1-min); 955 hPa (mbar)

Gloria was a category 2 typhoon that didn't make landfall.

=== CMA Tropical Depression 29 ===
- Tropical depression (CMA)
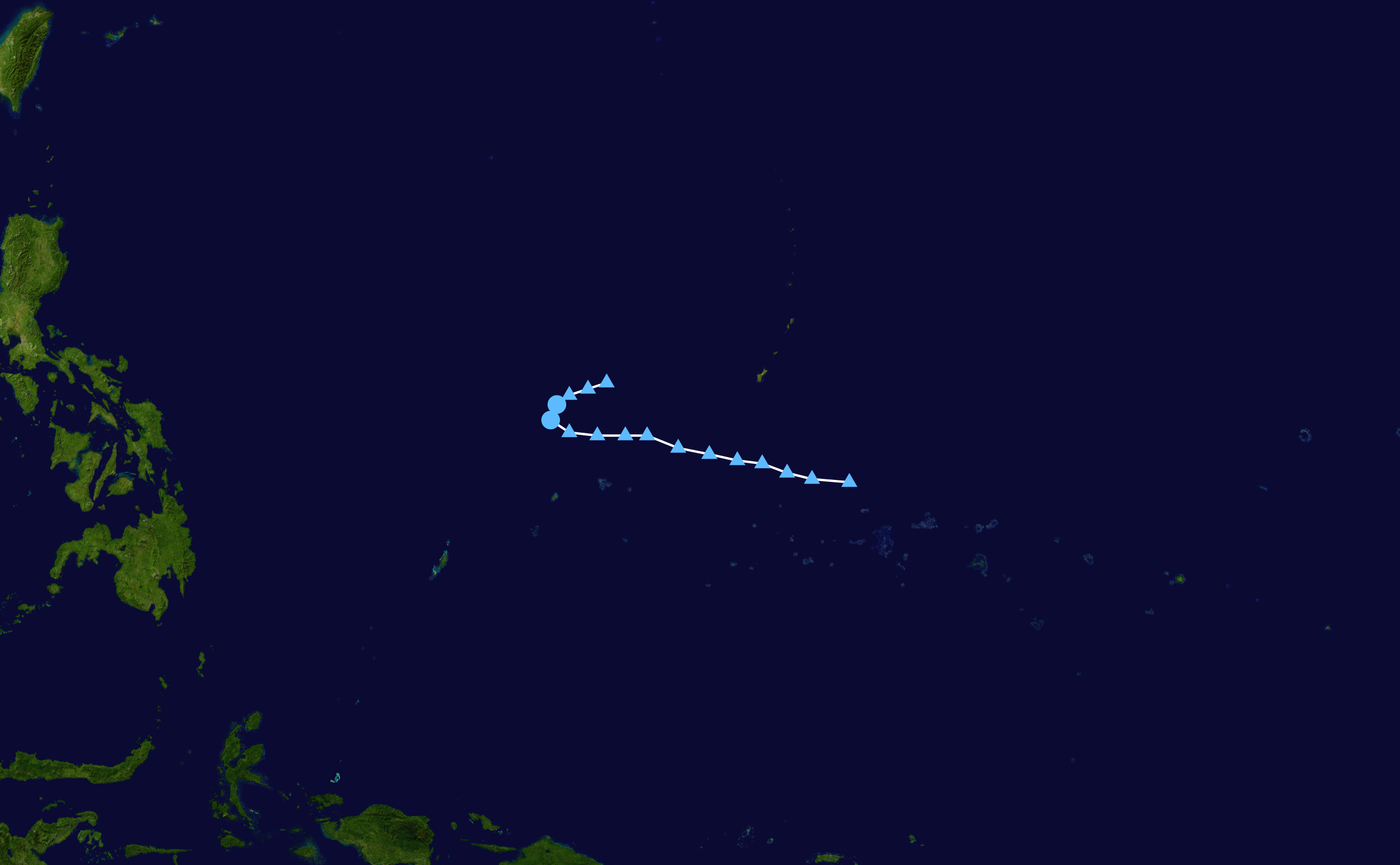
- Duration: October 12 – October 12
- Peak intensity: 45 km/h (30 mph) (10-min); 1006 hPa (mbar)

=== Tropical Storm Hester ===
- Severe tropical storm (JMA)
- Tropical storm (SSHWS)
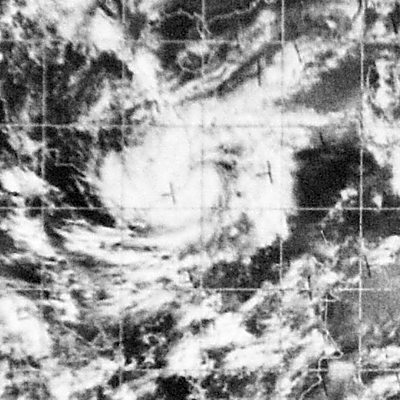
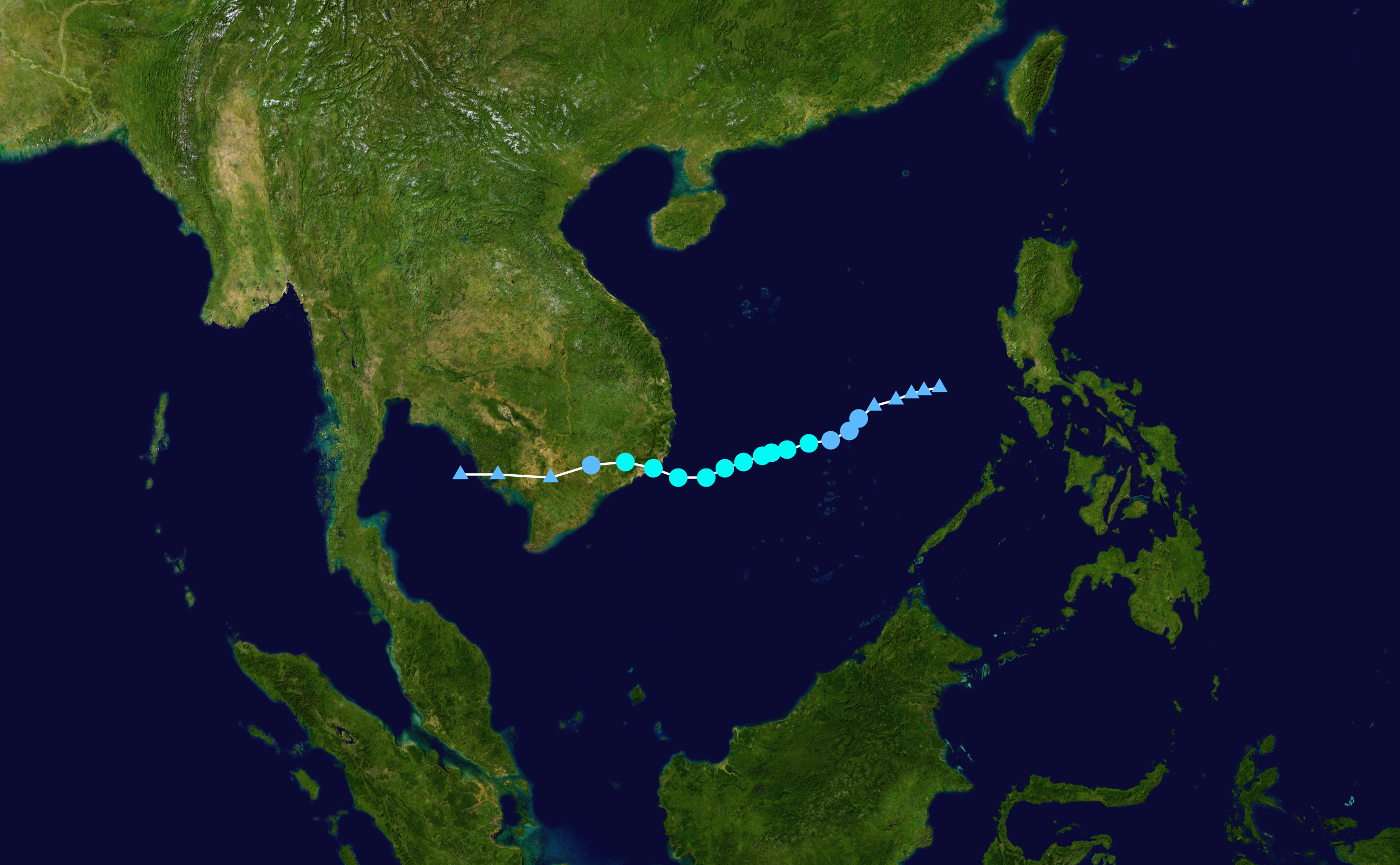
- Duration: October 15 – October 21
- Peak intensity: 100 km/h (65 mph) (1-min); 995 hPa (mbar)

Hester hit Vietnam as a tropical storm.

=== Typhoon Irma ===
- Typhoon (JMA)
- Category 1-equivalent typhoon (SSHWS)
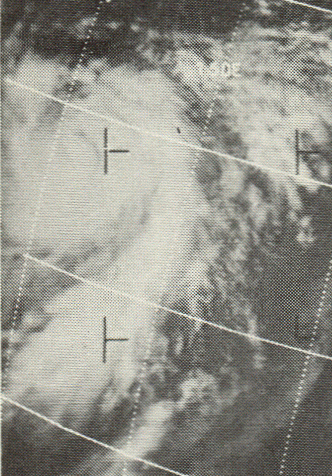
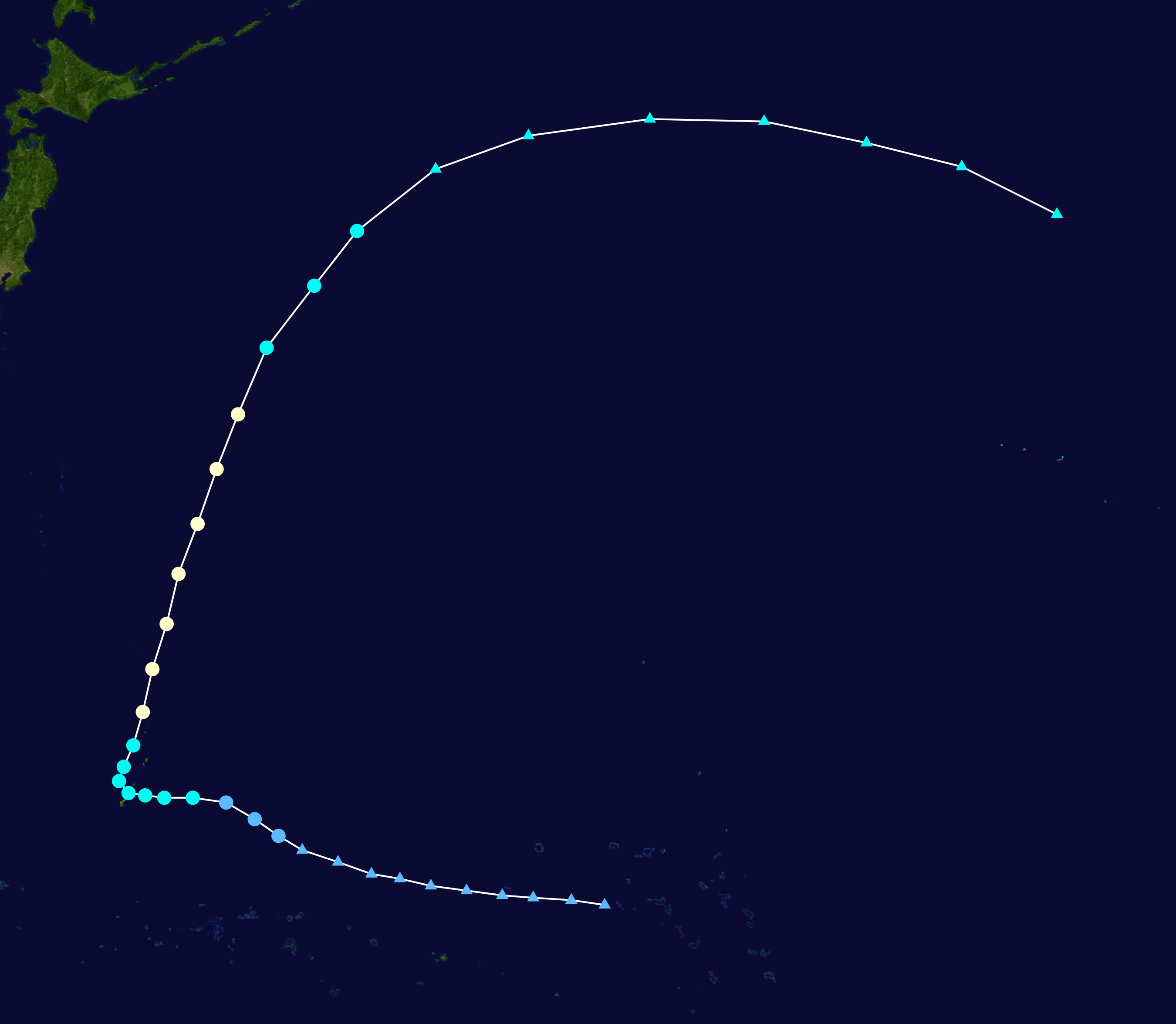
- Duration: October 18 – October 25
- Peak intensity: 150 km/h (90 mph) (1-min); 955 hPa (mbar)

Irma was a category 1 typhoon that didn't make landfall.

=== Typhoon Judy (Paring) ===
- Typhoon (JMA)
- Category 4-equivalent typhoon (SSHWS)
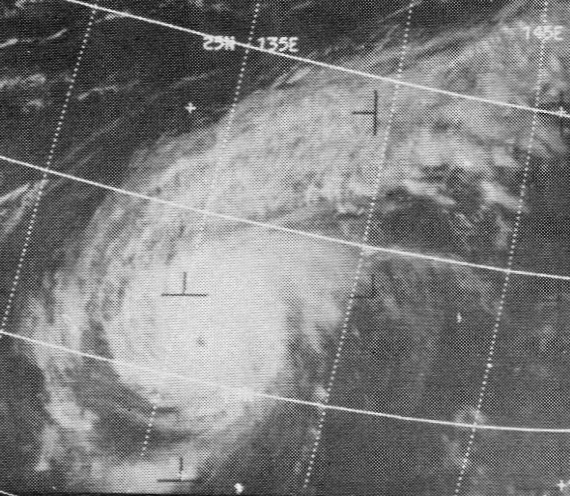
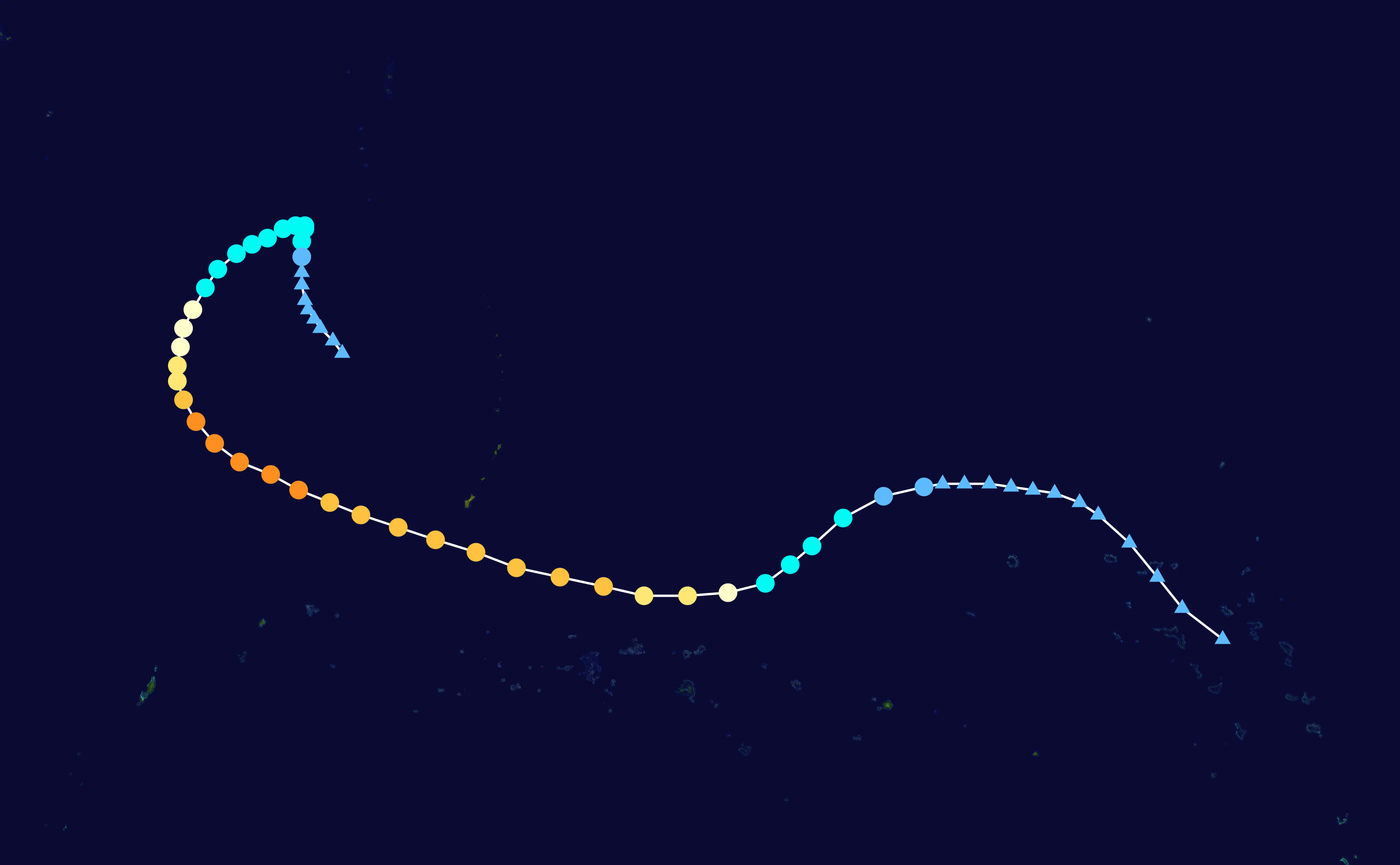
- Duration: October 21 – November 4
- Peak intensity: 220 km/h (140 mph) (1-min); 930 hPa (mbar)

Judy was a category 4 typhoon that didn't affect land.

=== Typhoon Kit ===
- Typhoon (JMA)
- Category 1-equivalent typhoon (SSHWS)
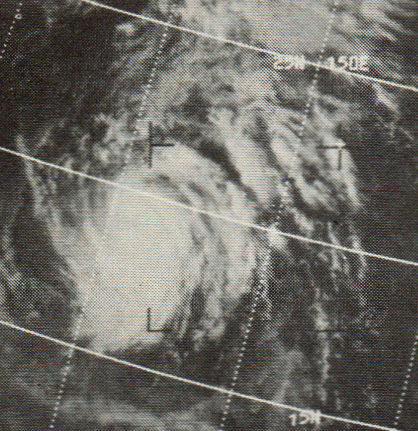
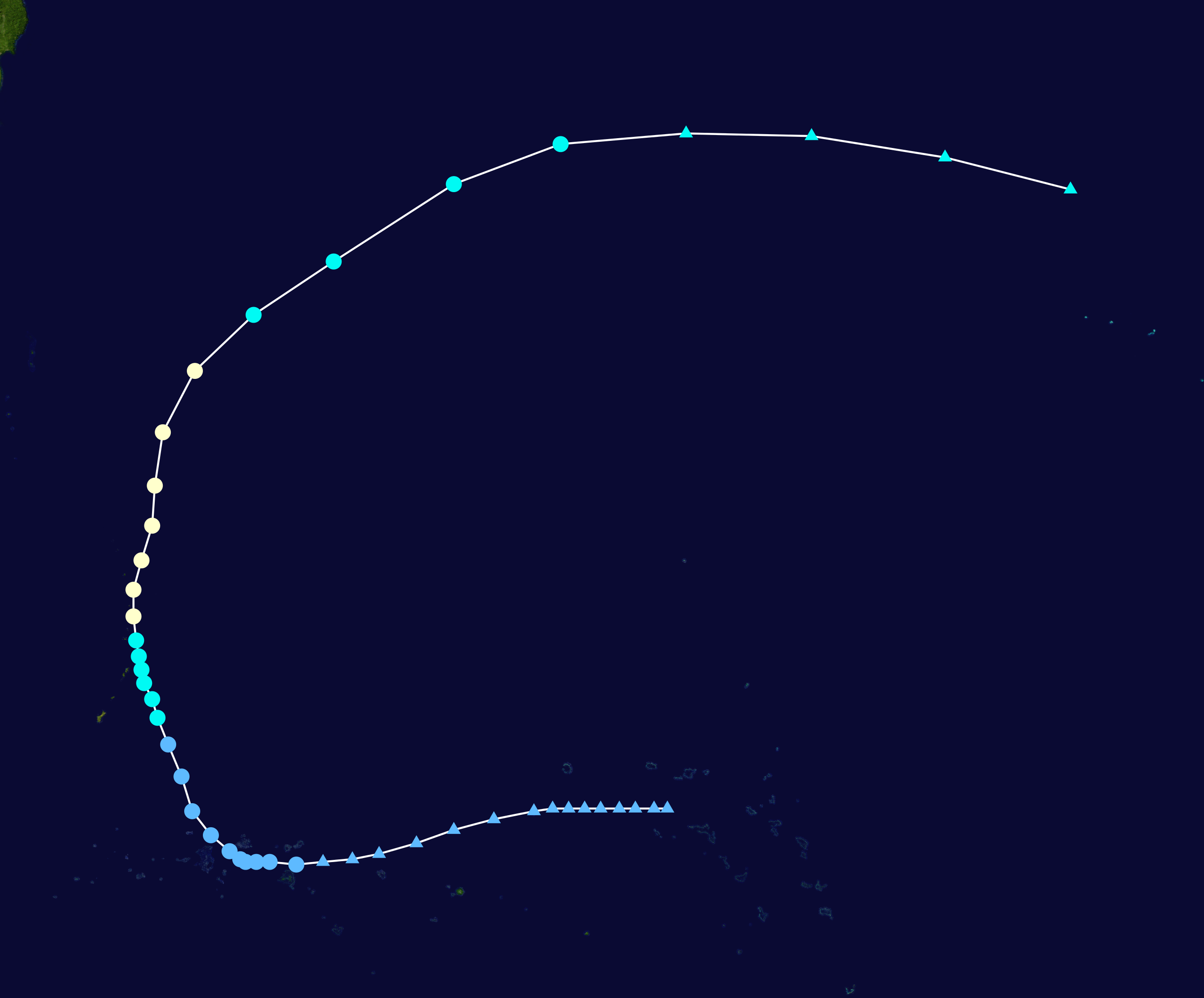
- Duration: October 26 – November 5
- Peak intensity: 130 km/h (80 mph) (1-min); 960 hPa (mbar)

Kit was a category 1 typhoon that existed from October 26 to November 5.

=== Typhoon Lola ===
- Typhoon (JMA)
- Category 3-equivalent typhoon (SSHWS)
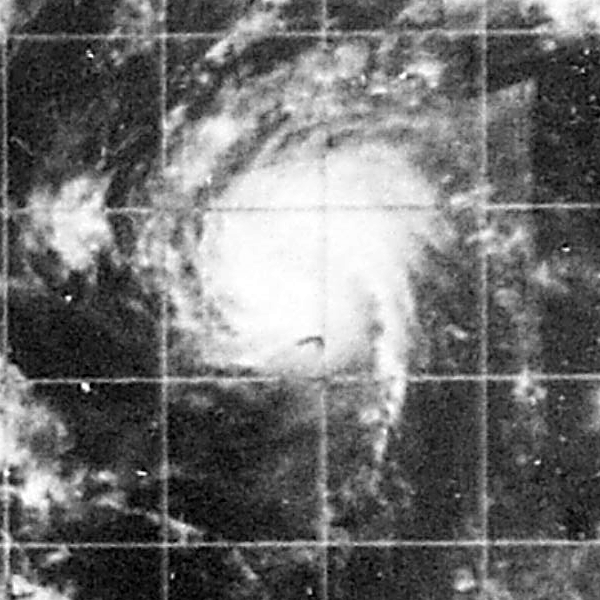
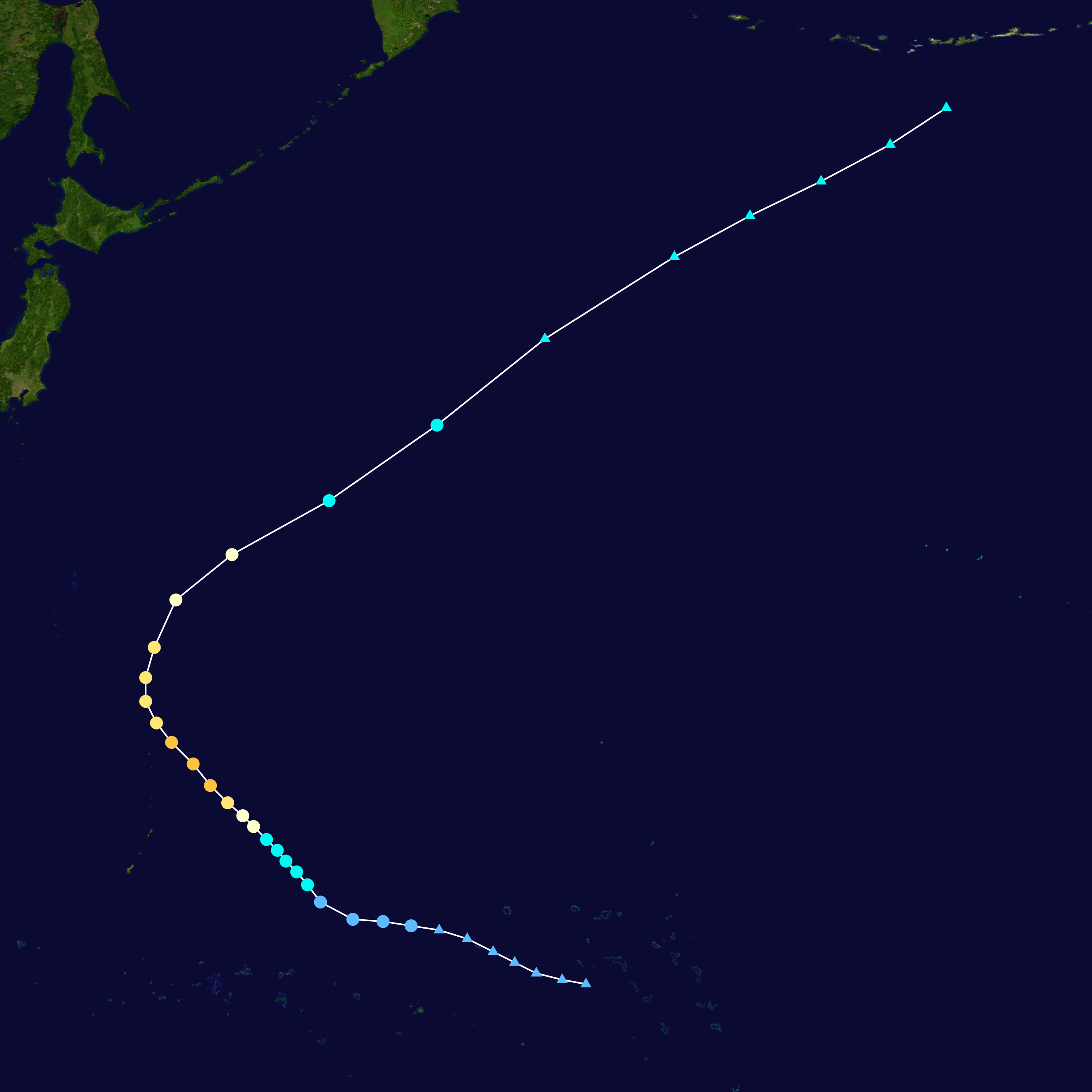
- Duration: November 5 – November 12
- Peak intensity: 195 km/h (120 mph) (1-min); 940 hPa (mbar)

Lola was a Category 3 typhoon that stayed out to sea.

=== Typhoon Mamie (Reming) ===
- Typhoon (JMA)
- Category 1-equivalent typhoon (SSHWS)
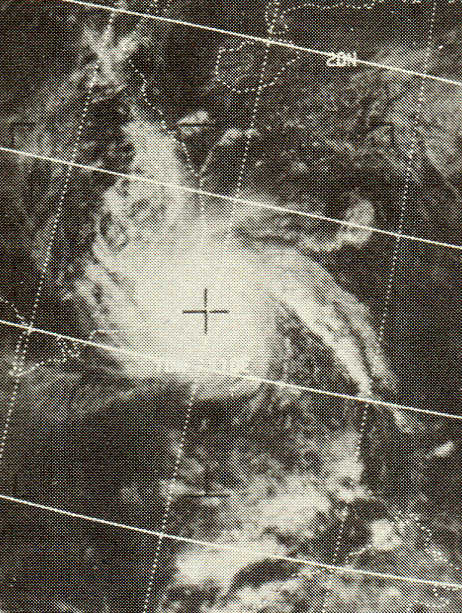
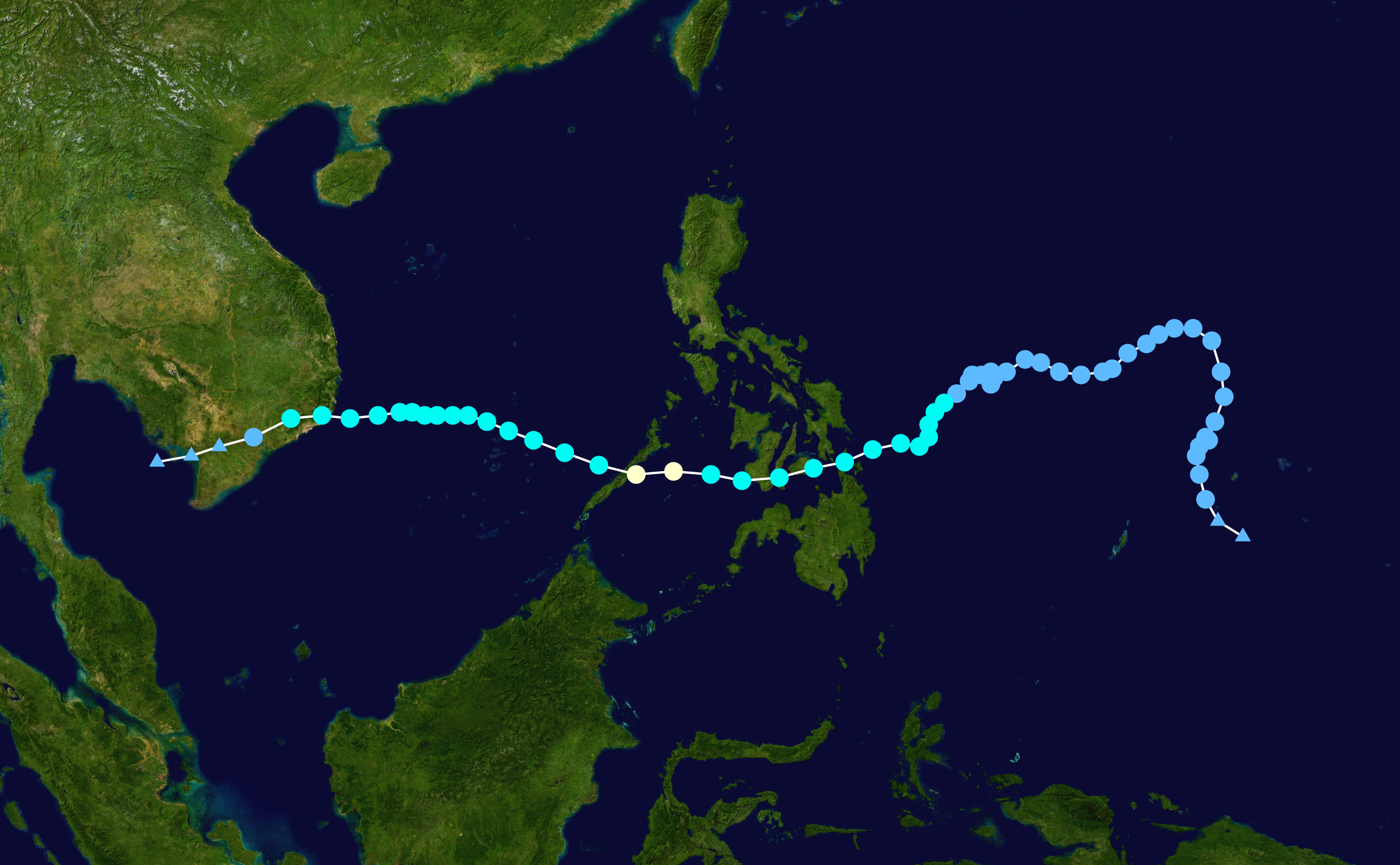
- Duration: November 9 – November 25
- Peak intensity: 120 km/h (75 mph) (1-min); 975 hPa (mbar)

Mamie hit the Philippines as a tropical storm.

=== Typhoon Nina (Seniang) ===
- Typhoon (JMA)
- Category 1-equivalent typhoon (SSHWS)
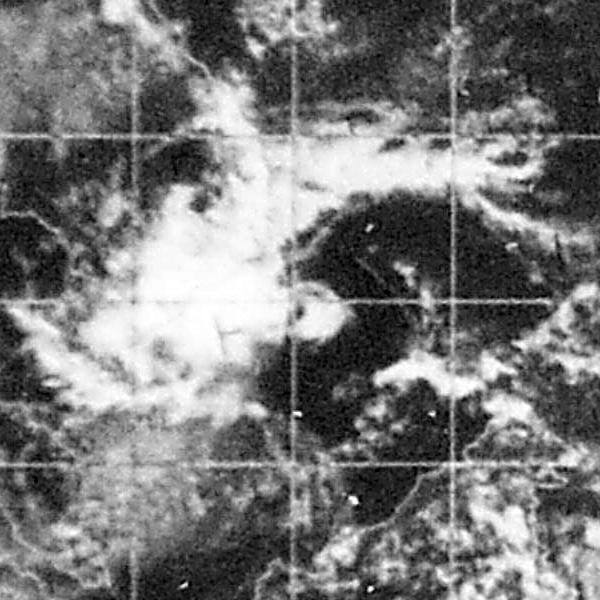
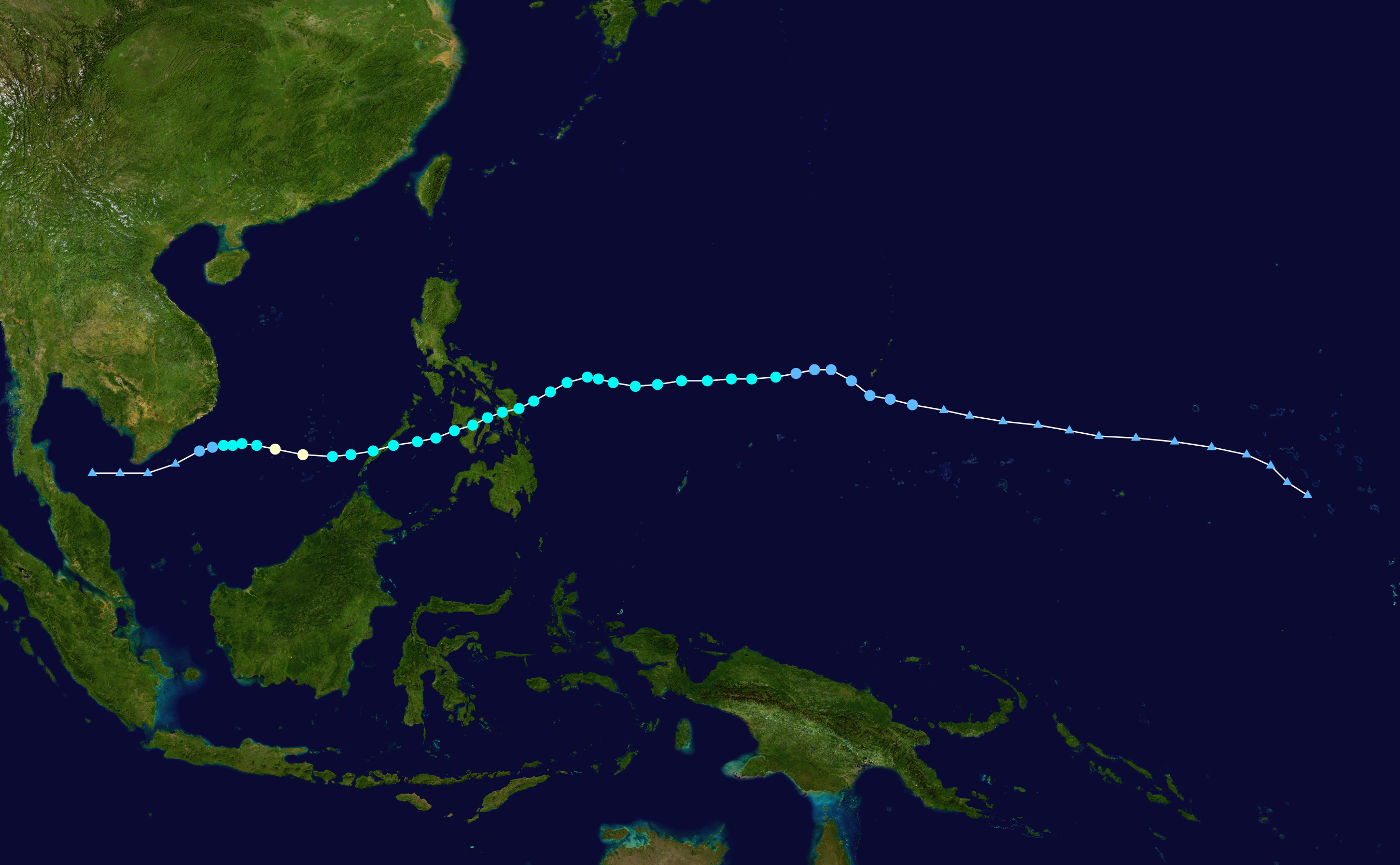
- Duration: November 15 – November 29
- Peak intensity: 130 km/h (80 mph) (1-min); 960 hPa (mbar)

Nina hit the Philippines as a tropical storm, and later intensified to a category 1 typhoon east of Vietnam.

=== Typhoon Ora (Toyang) ===
- Typhoon (JMA)
- Category 4-equivalent typhoon (SSHWS)
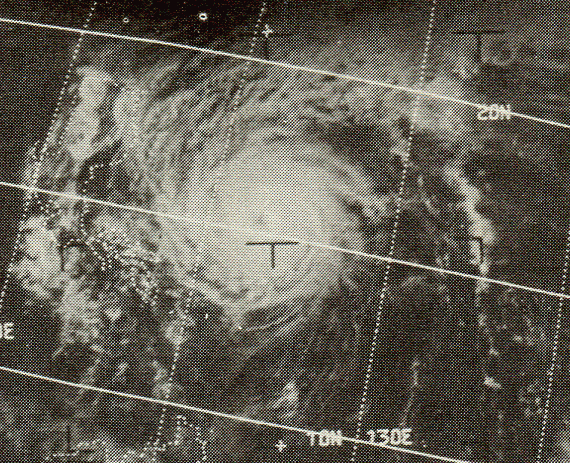
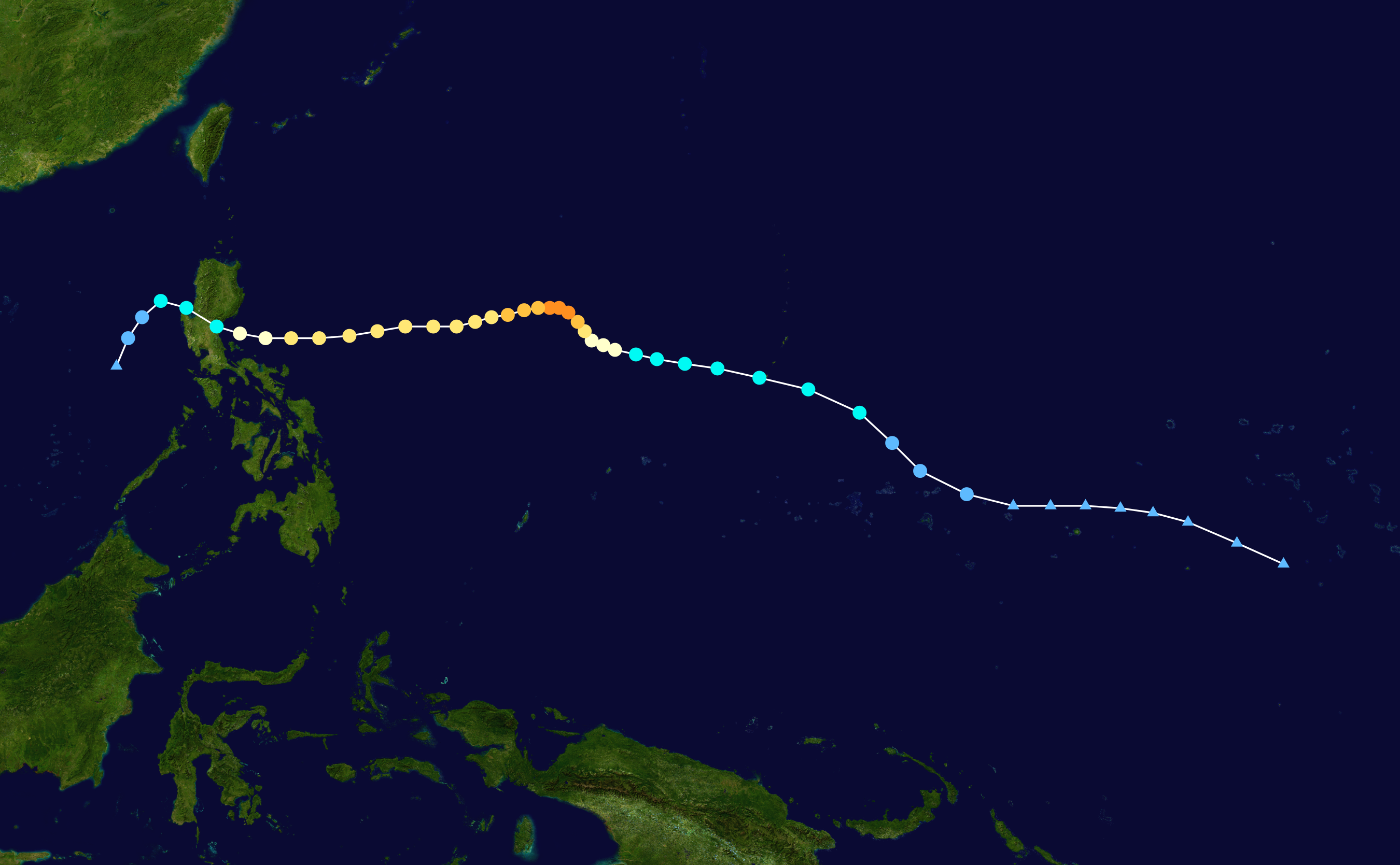
- Duration: November 19 – November 30
- Peak intensity: 220 km/h (140 mph) (1-min); 930 hPa (mbar)

A typhoon that made landfall in the Philippines as a category 1 and impacted most of the northern Philippines as a tropical storm.

== Storm names ==
Western North Pacific tropical cyclones were named by the Joint Typhoon Warning Center. The first storm of 1968 was named Jean and the final one was named Ora.

- Agnes 17W
- Bess 18W
- Carmen 19W
- Della 20W
- Elaine 21W
- Faye 22W
- Gloria 23W
- Hester 24W
- Irma 25W
- Judy 26W
- Kit 27W
- Lola 28W
- Mamie 29W
- Nina 30W
- Ora 31W
- Phyllis
- Rita
- Susan
- Tess
- Viola
- Winnie
- Alice
- Betty
- Cora
- Doris
- Elsie
- Flossie
- Grace
- Helen
- Ida
- June
- Kathy
- Lorna
- Marie
- Nancy
- Olga
- Pamela
- Ruby
- Sally
- Therese
- Violet
- Wilda
- Anita
- Billie
- Clara
- Dot
- Ellen
- Fran
- Georgia
- Hope
- Iris
- Joan
- Kate
- Louise
- Marge
- Nora
- Opal
- Patsy
- Ruth
- Sarah
- Thelma
- Vera
- Wanda
- Amy
- Babe
- Carla
- Dinah
- Emma
- Freda
- Gilda
- Harriet
- Ivy
- Jean 2W
- Kim 3W
- Lucy 6W
- Mary 7W
- Nadine 8W
- Olive 9W
- Polly 10W
- Rose 12W
- Shirley 13W
- Trix 14W
- Virginia 15W
- Wendy 16W

=== Philippines ===
Asiang	Biring	Konsing	Didang	Edeng
Gloring	Huaning	Iniang	Lusing	Maring
Nitang	Osang	Paring	Reming	Seniang
Toyang	Undang (unused)	Welpring (unused)	Yoning (unused)	Zoning (unused)
Auxiliary list
				Aring (unused)
Basiang (unused)	Kayang (unused)	Dorang (unused)	Enang (unused)	Grasing (unused)

The Philippine Weather Bureau (later renamed to the Philippine Atmospheric, Geophysical and Astronomical Services Administration in 1972) uses its own naming scheme for tropical cyclones in their area of responsibility. PAGASA assigns names to tropical depressions that form within their area of responsibility and any tropical cyclone that might move into their area of responsibility. Should the list of names for a given year prove to be insufficient, names are taken from an auxiliary list, the first 6 of which are published each year before the season starts. Names not retired from this list will be used again in the 1972 season. This is the same list used for the 1964 season, except for Didang and Iniang, which replaced Dading and Isang; the latter would later be reintroduced in 1972 for reasons still unknown. The Philippine Weather Bureau and its successor PAGASA uses its own naming scheme that starts in the Filipino alphabet, with names of Filipino female names ending with "ng" (A, B, K, D, etc.). Names that were not assigned/going to use are marked in gray.

== Season effects ==
This table will list all the storms that developed in the northwestern Pacific Ocean west of the International Date Line and north of the equator during 1968. It will include their intensity, duration, name, areas affected, deaths, missing persons (in parentheses), and damage totals. Classification and intensity values will be based on estimations conducted by the JMA, however due to lack of information around this time sustained winds were recorded by the JTWC. All damage figures will be in 1968 USD. Damages and deaths from a storm will include when the storm was a precursor wave or an extratropical low.

Name	Dates	Peak intensity			Areas affected	Damage (USD)	Deaths	Ref(s).
Name	Dates	Category	Wind speed	Pressure	Areas affected	Damage (USD)	Deaths	Ref(s).
TD	January 20–26	Tropical depression	Not specified	1,002 hPa (29.59 inHg)	None	None	None	
TD	November 3–4	Tropical depression	Not specified	1,006 hPa (29.71 inHg)	None	None	None	
Lola	November 5–12	Typhoon	195 km/h (120 mph)	940 hPa (27.76 inHg)	Mariana Islands	None	None	
Mamie (Reming)	November 9–25	Typhoon	120 km/h (75 mph)	975 hPa (28.79 inHg)	Philippines, Vietnam	None	None	
Nina (Seniang)	November 15–29	Typhoon	130 km/h (80 mph)	960 hPa (28.35 inHg)	Philippines, Vietnam	None	None	
Ora (Toyang)	November 19–30	Typhoon	220 km/h (135 mph)	930 hPa (27.46 inHg)	Philippines	None	None	
TD	December 7	Tropical depression	Not specified	1,007 hPa (29.74 inHg)	Caroline Islands	None	None	

== See also ==
- Australian cyclone seasons: 1967–68, 1968–69
- South Pacific cyclone seasons: 1967–68, 1968–69
- South-West Indian Ocean cyclone seasons: 1967–68, 1968–69
