= A4 =

A4 commonly refers to:

- A4 paper, a paper size defined by the ISO 216 standard, measuring 210 mm × 297 mm (8.27 in × 11.7 in)

A4 and variants may also refer to:

== Arts and media ==
- A4 or A_{4}, the musical note La or A in the fourth octave
- A440 (pitch standard), the use of the musical note A to reference musical pitch
- A4, a 1981 component for the Scourge of the Slave Lord adventure in the Dungeons and Dragons role playing game
- Vlad A4, Belarusian YouTuber

== Military units ==
- A4, the designation for air force headquarters in the NATO continental staff system concerned with logistics
  - A4 Air Logistics, a branch of the Joint Force Air Component Headquarters in the UK
- A 4; see List of Swedish regiments for A4, a Swedish designation (4th Artillery Regiment) that has been used by:
- Gotland Artillery Regiment (designation: A 4), until 1892
- Norrland Artillery Regiment (designation: A 4), 1893–1997

== Science and technology ==
=== Computing ===
- Apple A4, a microprocessor used in some Apple products
- AMD A4, a microprocessor
- Samsung Galaxy A04, a smartphone manufactured by Samsung Electronics

=== Biology and medicine ===
- ATC code A04 Antiemetics and antinauseants, a subgroup of the Anatomical Therapeutic Chemical Classification System
- Lipoxin A4, a lipoxin
- Androstenedione, an androgen steroid hormone
- Combretastatin A-4, a stilbenoid chemical compound
- Subfamily A4, a rhodopsin-like receptors subfamily

=== Other uses in science and technology ===
- British NVC community A4 (Hydrocharis morsus-ranae - Stratiotes aloides community), one type of Aquatic communities in the British National Vegetation Classification system
- A_{4}, the alternating group on four elements
- A4, a type of stainless steel
- Lely (company) Astronaut A4, the fourth version of the Astronaut robot manufactured by Lely
- Zeolite A-4, a sodium-type molecular sieve also known as 4A
- M16A4, a variant of the American M16 rifle

== Transportation ==
=== Aeronautics and astronautics ===
- A-4 Helldiver, the civil version of the Curtiss Falcon an attack aircraft manufactured by Curtiss Aircraft Company
- Douglas A-4 Skyhawk, a 1954 attack aircraft manufactured by Douglas Aircraft Company
- Breda A.4, a 1926 Italian biplane trainer aircraft
- Aggregat-4, the technical name for V-2 ballistic missile
- Southern Winds Airlines (IATA code: A4), a defunct Argentine airline
- Azimuth (airline) (IATA code: A4), a Russian airline
- A-004, the sixth and final abort test of the Apollo spacecraft
- SPAD S.A-4, 1915 French reconnaissance fighter built by SPAD

=== Railways ===
- Bavarian A IV, an 1852 German steam locomotive model
- LNER Class A4, a class of steam locomotives, including the famous Mallard
- PRR A4, an American Pennsylvania Railroad locomotive classification
- Togoshi Station (station number A-04), Toei Asakusa Line, Tokyo

=== Ships ===
- USS A-4 (SS-5), a Plunger-class submarine of the US Navy
- HMNZS Kahu (A04), a 1978 Royal New Zealand Navy Moa-class inshore patrol vessel
- HMS A4, an A-class submarine of the Royal Navy
- Belgian ship A4, a Belgian naval patrol vessel of World War II

=== Other vehicles ===
- Audi A4, a luxury compact executive car manufactured by Audi, introduced in 1994
- Arrows A4, a 1982 British racing car
- Prussian A 4, a Prussian railbus
- Leopard 1A4, a variant of the German Leopard 1 main battle tank
- Leopard 2A4, a variant of the German Leopard 2 main battle tank

=== Roads and routes ===
- List of A4 roads
- A4, a Metrobus route in Washington, D.C., US

== Other uses ==
- A4 paper, a paper size defined by the ISO 216 standard, measuring 210 mm × 297 mm (8.27 in × 11.7 in)
- A4 (classification), an amputee sport classification
- Réti Opening (Encyclopaedia of Chess Openings code: A04)
- A4, a climbing route grade
- In town and country planning in the UK, code A4, permission to use specific land or premises for pubs and bars
- A4 pod, a family of killer whales living in British Columbia coastal waters
- Biu-Mandara A.4 languages, a family of languages spoken in Cameroon and Nigeria
- A4 Revolution, the 2022 COVID-19 protests in China
- Assembly Four, an Australian computer technology company which operated Switter

== See also ==
- 4A (disambiguation)
- A4A (disambiguation)
- AIV (disambiguation)
