= 4A =

4A or IV-A may refer to:

- 4A, Ararat International Airlines' IATA airline designator
- 4A, a series of Toyota A engine produced by Toyota Motor Corporation (1982-2002)
- 4A Centre for Contemporary Asian Art, Sydney, Australia
- 4A Engine, a video game engine developed by 4A Games
- 4A Games, a video game development company in Ukraine
- Associated Actors and Artistes of America, also known as 4As, federation of American trade unions
- Calabarzon or Region IV-A, a Region in the Philippines
- Pixel 4a, an Android smartphone
- Vermont Route 4A, a highway in Vermont, U.S.
- Zeolite 4A, a sodium-type molecular sieve

== See also ==
- 4A/OP, a radiative transfer model for the infrared
- Long March 4A, a Chinese rocket
- Stalag IV-A, a German prisoner of war camp
- TI-99/4A, a 1981 home computer
- AAAA (disambiguation)
- A4 (disambiguation)
- Iva (disambiguation)
