= Iva =

Iva or IVA may refer to:

== People ==
- Iva (given name), including a list of people with the name
- Kaia Iva (born 1964), Estonian politician
- Sulev Iva (born 1969), Estonian Võro identity advocate
- IVA (singer) (born 1978), operatic singer-songwriter
- Tommy Iva (born 2000), Malagasy footballer

== Places ==
- Iva, Indiana, an unincorporated community in the United States
- Iva, South Carolina, a town in the United States
- Iva, Iran (disambiguation), places in Iran
- Iva, Samoa, a village
- Iva Valley, a valley in Nigeria

== Science, medicine and technology ==
- Integrated Visual and Auditory (IVA-2), continuous performance task, a type of neuropsychological test
- Interactive visual analysis, a methodology for visual exploration and data mining of complex data sets
- Intravenous anesthesia, a type of anesthesia
- IVA, a designation of a number of Intelsat IV satellites — see List of Intelsat satellites
- Intelligent virtual agent in artificial intelligence
- Intelligent virtual assistant, a software agent that can perform tasks based on commands or questions
- IVA, the old IUPAC name for what is now IUPAC Group 4
- IVA, the CAS name for IUPAC Group 14
- Hurricane Iva (disambiguation)
- Iva (plant), a plant genus in the family Asteraceae
- Iva (copepod), a former crustacean genus in the family Pontellidae
- Isovaleric acidemia, an autosomal recessive metabolic disorder

== Organizations ==
- Independent Voters Association, a North Dakota U.S. political organization
- Informationsvidenskabelige Akademi, a Danish university
- Royal Swedish Academy of Engineering Sciences, (Swedish: Kungliga Ingenjörsvetenskapsakademien)
- International Volleyball Association, a former co-ed professional volleyball league in the United States

== Other ==
- Individual Voluntary Arrangement, in the United Kingdom, an alternative to bankruptcy
- Individual Vehicle Approval, a kind of motor vehicle type approval
- Iva (film), a 1993 film by Izu Ojukwu
- Iva (painting), a 1973 painting by Joan Mitchell
- Ivanhoe railway station, Melbourne
- 497 Iva, asteroid

== See also ==
- Stalag IV-A, a German World War II POW camp in Saxony
