= AAAA =

AAAA may refer to:

== Internet and computing ==
- AAAA protocol, within computer security, "authentication, authorization, accounting and auditing" – the AAA protocol combined with auditing
- AAAA record, also known as "IPv6 address record", maps a hostname to a 128-bit IPv6 address in the Domain Name System (DNS)
- Internet Authentication Service, as an acronym for the four main services provided: Authentication, Authorization, Accounting, and Auditing

== Organizations ==
- Aboriginal Art Association of Australia, a peak body for Aboriginal art in Australia
- American Academy of Anesthesiologist Assistants, a professional association for certified anesthesiologist assistants in the United States
- American Association for the Advancement of Atheism, an atheistic and antireligious organization
- American Association of Advertising Agencies, a U.S. trade association for advertising agencies
- Anguilla Amateur Athletic Association, former name of the Anguilla Amateur Athletic Federation, governing body for athletics in Anguilla
- Asociación Argentina Amigos de la Astronomía, an amateur astronomy civil association
- Associated Actors and Artistes of America, an association of the performer trade unions Actors' Equity, AFTRA, Agma, and Agva
- Australian Automotive Aftermarket Association, an automotive industry association for automotive aftermarket parts

== Other uses ==
- AAAA battery, a 1.5 volt battery, smaller than the AAA size
- AaAa, possible reading of the name Aa, an ancient Egyptian architect
- AAAA, a rhyme scheme

== See also ==
- 4A (disambiguation)
- A4 (disambiguation)
- A (disambiguation)
- AA (disambiguation)
- AAA (disambiguation)
- AAAA Tourist attraction
- AAAAA Tourist Attractions of China
- AaAaAA!!! – A Reckless Disregard for Gravity
