= List of storms named Adele =

The name Adele has been used for four tropical cyclones worldwide.

In the East Pacific Ocean:

- Hurricane Adele (1966) – made landfall in Mexico as a Category 1 hurricane
- Hurricane Adele (1970) – a Category 1 hurricane that never approached land

The name Adele was retired and replaced with Aletta.

In the South-West Indian Ocean:

- Tropical Disturbance Adele (1974) – a depression in the Mozambique Channel that made landfall in Madagascar

In the Australian region:

- Cyclone Adele (1969) – a tropical storm off the east coast of Australia that did not approach land

== See also ==
- Cyclone Abele (2010) – a South-West Indian Ocean tropical cyclone with a similar name
