= 1968–69 South-West Indian Ocean cyclone season =

Cyclone season in the Southwest Indian Ocean

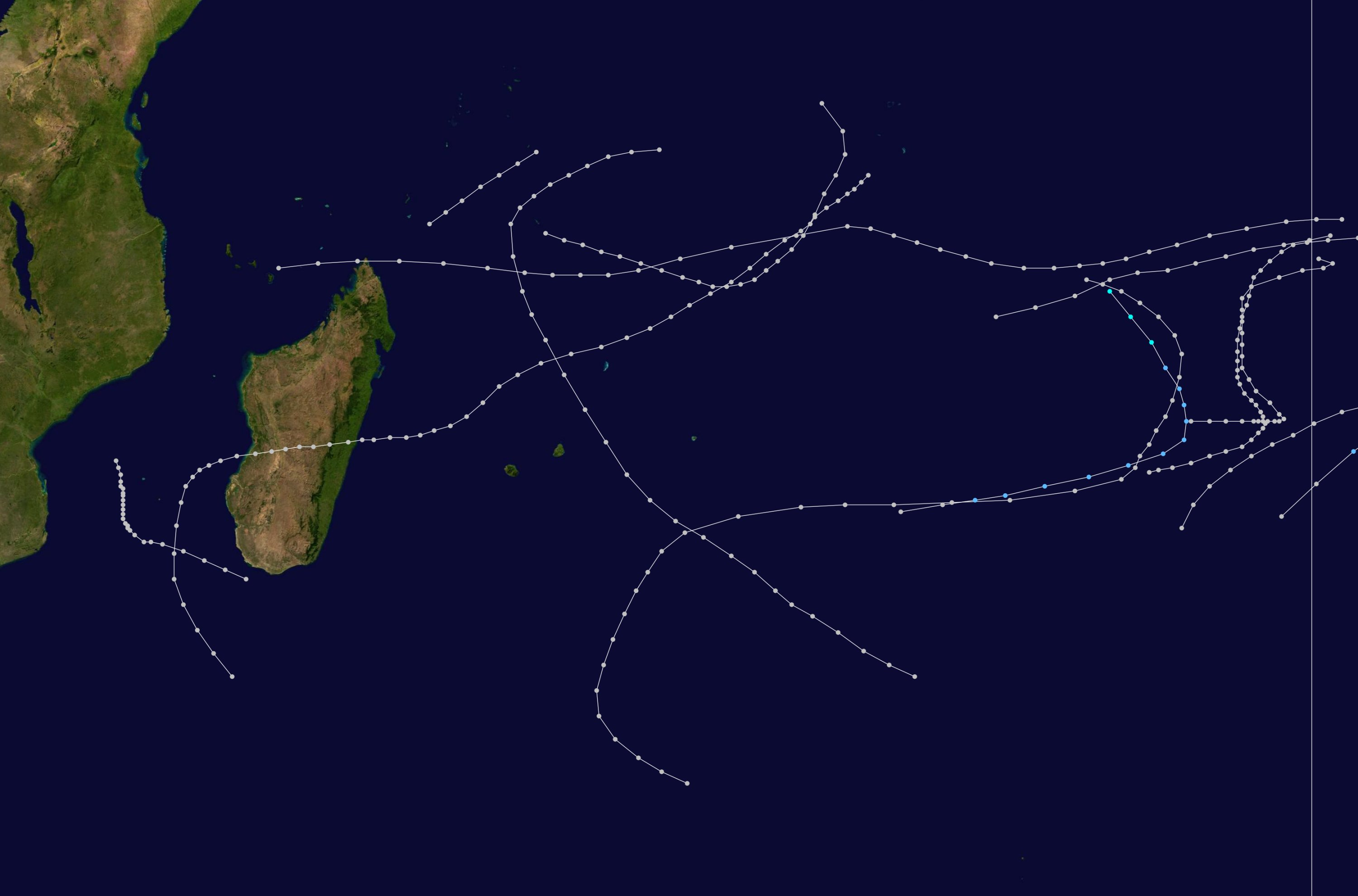
- Season summary map

Seasonal boundaries
- First system formed: October 28, 1968
- Last system dissipated: March 28, 1969

Strongest storm
- Name: Dany & Helene

Seasonal statistics
- Total depressions: 8
- Total storms: 7
- Tropical cyclones: 4
- Total fatalities: 82
- Total damage: Unknown

Related articles
- 1968–69 Australian region cyclone season; 1968–69 South Pacific cyclone season

The 1968–69 South-West Indian Ocean cyclone season was a below average cyclone season.

== Systems ==
=== Severe Tropical Storm Annie ===
- Severe tropical storm (MFR)
- Tropical storm (SSHWS)
- Duration: October 28 – November 4
- Peak intensity: 100 km/h (65 mph) (10-min);

Annie existed from October 28 to November 4.

=== Moderate Tropical Storm Bettina–Berthe ===
- Moderate tropical storm (MFR)
- Tropical storm (SSHWS)
- Duration: December 27 – January 4
- Peak intensity: 85 km/h (50 mph) (10-min);

Berthe existed from December 27 to January 4.

=== Moderate Tropical Storm Claire ===
- Moderate tropical storm (MFR)
- Tropical storm (SSHWS)
- Duration: January 15 – January 17
- Peak intensity: 65 km/h (40 mph) (10-min);

Claire existed from January 15 to January 17.

=== Tropical Cyclone Dany ===
- Tropical cyclone (MFR)
- Category 1 tropical cyclone (SSHWS)
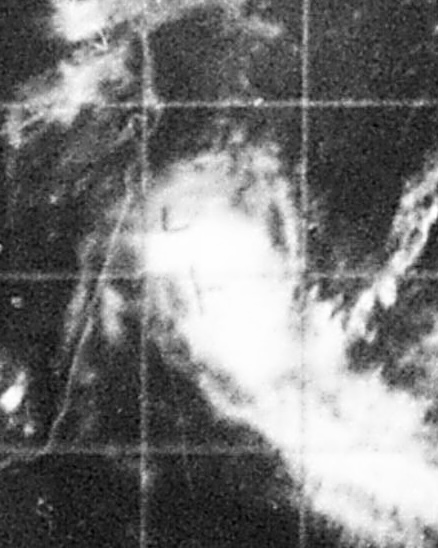
- Duration: January 28 – February 10
- Peak intensity: 150 km/h (90 mph) (10-min);

Tropical Cyclone Dany caused 80 deaths in Madagascar, and 2 in Réunion.

=== Tropical Depression Eve ===
- Tropical depression (MFR)
- Tropical depression (SSHWS)
- Duration: January 29 – February 2
- Peak intensity: 55 km/h (35 mph) (10-min);

Eve existed from January 29 to February 2.

=== Tropical Cyclone Enid–Fanny ===
- Tropical cyclone (MFR)
- Category 1 tropical cyclone (SSHWS)
- Duration: February 5 – February 15
- Peak intensity: 120 km/h (75 mph) (10-min);

Fanny existed from February 5 to February 15.

=== Tropical Cyclone Gilette ===
- Tropical cyclone (MFR)
- Category 1 tropical cyclone (SSHWS)
- Duration: February 15 – February 19
- Peak intensity: 120 km/h (75 mph) (10-min);

Gilette existed from February 15 to February 19.

=== Tropical Cyclone Helene ===
- Tropical cyclone (MFR)
- Category 1 tropical cyclone (SSHWS)
- Duration: March 19 – March 28
- Peak intensity: 150 km/h (90 mph) (10-min);

Helene existed from March 19 to March 28.

== See also ==
- Atlantic hurricane seasons: 1968, 1969
- Eastern Pacific hurricane seasons: 1968, 1969
- Western Pacific typhoon seasons: 1968, 1969
- North Indian Ocean cyclone seasons: 1968, 1969
