= List of retired Pacific hurricane names =

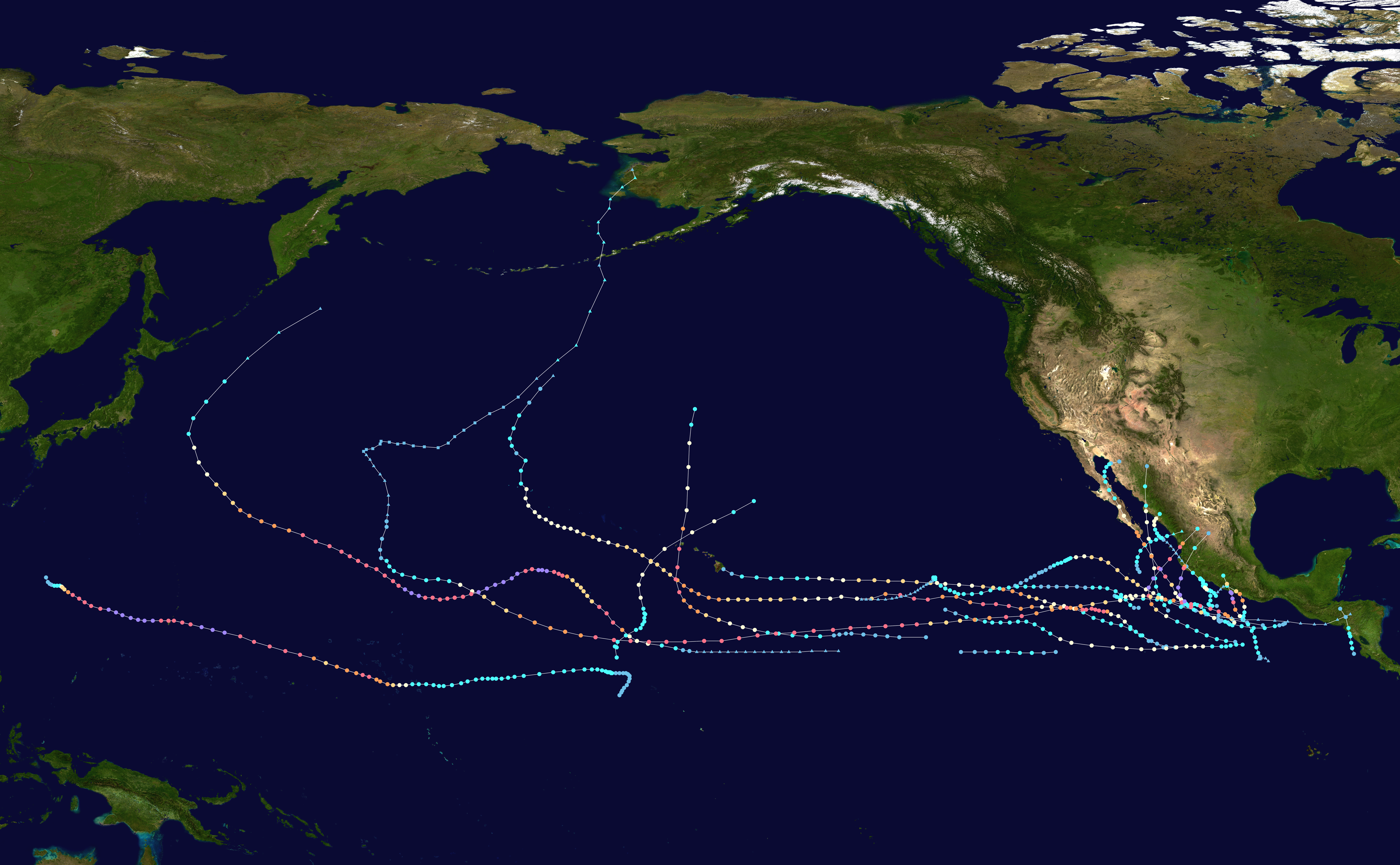
Tracks of all retired Pacific hurricanes between 1965 and 2024

Within the Pacific Ocean, the name of any significant tropical cyclone can be retired from the tropical cyclone naming lists by the World Meteorological Organization if it concludes that a storm was so deadly or damaging that any future use of that name would be inappropriate. Storm names can also be retired for other reasons, such as being deemed politically insensitive. Within the Eastern Pacific and Central Pacific basins (between 140°W and the western coast of North America and between the International Date Line (180°) and 140°W, respectively, and north of the Equator), a total of 22 names have been retired from the official lists. The deadliest system to have its name retired was Hurricane Pauline, which caused over 230 fatalities when it struck Mexico during October 1997, while the costliest hurricane was Hurricane Otis which caused an economic impact of over $12 billion in October 2023. Hurricane John was the most recent Pacific tropical cyclone to have its name retired.

== Background ==
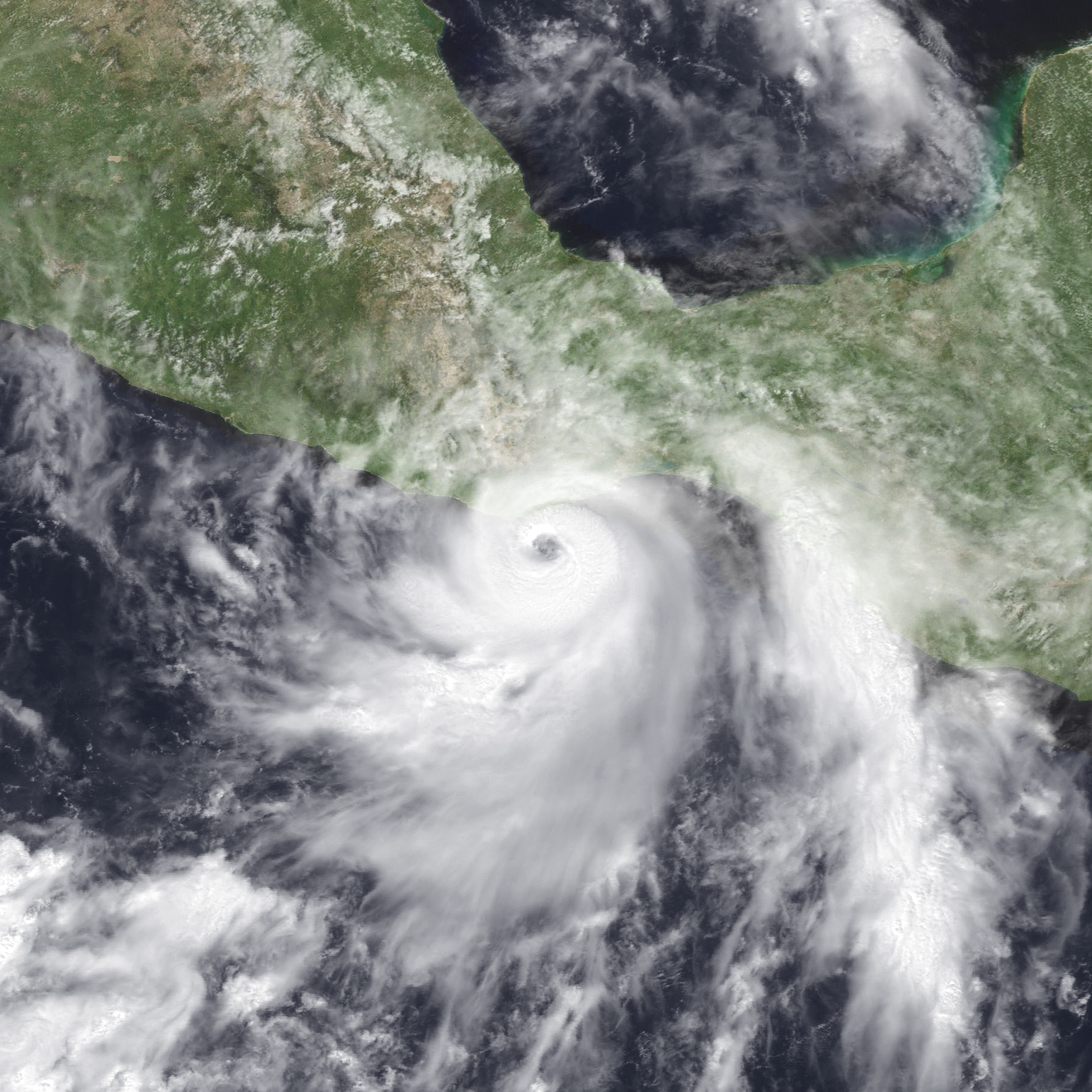
Hurricane Pauline at peak intensity approaching Puerto Ángel, Oaxaca

In 1950 a tropical cyclone that affected Hawaii was named Able, after a tropical cyclone had not affected Hawaii for a number of years. The system subsequently became widely known as Hurricane Hiki, since Hiki is Hawaiian for Able. Typhoons Olive and Della of 1952 and 1957, respectively, developed within the Central Pacific, but were not named until they had crossed the International Dateline and moved into the Western Pacific basin. During 1957, two other tropical cyclones developed in the Central Pacific and were named Kanoa and Nina by the Hawaiian military meteorological offices. It was subsequently decided that future tropical cyclones would be named by borrowing names from the Western Pacific naming lists.

Within the Eastern Pacific basin the naming of tropical cyclones started in 1960, with four sets of female names initially designed to be used consecutively before being repeated. In 1965 after two lists of names had been used, it was decided to return to the top of the second list and to start recycling the sets of names on an annual basis. In 1977 after protests by various women's rights groups, NOAA made the decision to relinquish control over the name selection by allowing a regional committee of the WMO to select new sets of names. The WMO selected six lists of names which contained male names and rotated every six years. They also decided that the new lists of hurricane names would start to be used in 1978 which was a year earlier than the Atlantic. Since 1978 the same lists of names have been used, with names of significant tropical cyclones removed from the lists and replaced with new names.

During 1979, after ten names had been borrowed from the Western Pacific naming lists, Hawaiian names were reinstated for tropical cyclones developing into tropical storms forming in the Central Pacific. Five sets of Hawaiian names, using only the 12 letters of the Hawaiian alphabet, were drafted with the intent being to use the sets of names on an annual rotation basis. However, after no storms had developed in this region between 1979 and 1981, the annual lists were scrapped and replaced with four sets of names and designed to be used consecutively. Ahead of the 2007 hurricane season, the Central Pacific Hurricane Center (CPHC) and the Hawaii State Civil Defense requested that the hurricane committee retire eleven names from the Eastern Pacific naming lists. However, the committee declined the request and noted that its criteria for the retirement of names was "well defined and very strict." It was felt that while the systems may have had a significant impact on the Hawaiian Islands, none of the impacts were major enough to warrant the retirement of the names. It was also noted that the committee had previously not retired names for systems that had a greater impact than those that had been submitted. The CPHC also introduced a revised set of Hawaiian names for the Central Pacific, after they had worked with the University of Hawaii Hawaiian studies department to ensure the correct meaning and appropriate historical and cultural use of the names.

The practice of retiring significant names was started during 1955 by the United States Weather Bureau in the Atlantic basin, after hurricanes Carol, Edna, and Hazel struck the Northeastern United States and caused a significant amount of damage in the previous year. Initially the names were only designed to be retired for ten years after which they might be reintroduced, however, it was decided at the 1969 Interdepartmental hurricane conference that any significant hurricane in the future would have its name permanently retired. Several names have been removed from the Pacific naming lists for various reasons other than for causing a significant amount of death/destruction, which include being pronounced in a very similar way to other names and for political reasons.

== Names retired in the Eastern Pacific basin ==
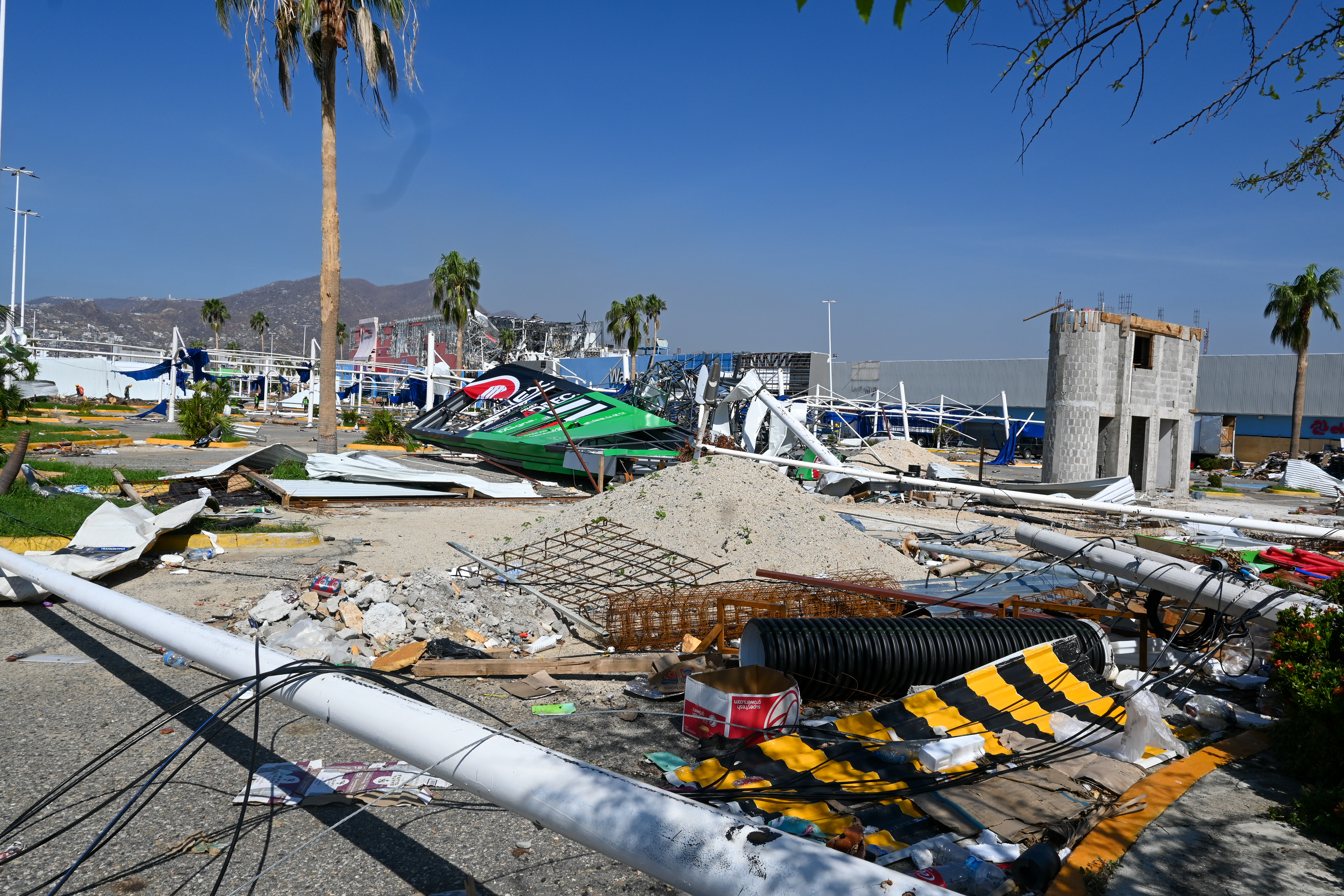
Damage in Acapulco, Guerrero, from Hurricane Otis

In the Eastern Pacific basin (between 140°W and the western coast of North America), 18 names have been retired as of 2026. Prior to the start of the modern naming lists in 1978, the names Hazel and Adele were retired from the list of names for reasons that are not clear. The name Fico was subsequently retired after the system had affected Hawaii in 1978. The name Knut was removed after being used in 1987 for unknown reasons. In 1989, the name Iva was removed as it was pronounced very similarly to Iwa, which was retired from the Central Pacific lists of names in 1982 after affecting Hawaii. In the early 1990s the names Fefa and Ismael were both retired after they affected Hawaii and Northern Mexico, respectively. Hurricane Pauline became the deadliest Eastern Pacific hurricane, and its name was retired after it affected Mexico in 1997.

Political considerations prompted retirement of the name Adolph and removal of the name Israel (Note: Israel was the designated replacement name for Ismael going into the 2001 season, but was supplanted by Ivo, and so was never used.) at the start of the 2001 season, after controversy arose over their use. The name Kenna was retired in 2003 after it became one of the most intense Pacific hurricanes ever recorded. The name Alma was retired in 2009 after it had become the first Eastern Pacific tropical cyclone on record to make landfall along the Pacific Coast of Central America. The name Manuel was retired in 2013, after it became the first Eastern Pacific tropical cyclone on record to make landfall in mainland Mexico, redevelop over water, and become a hurricane. At the 2015 hurricane committee meeting the name Odile was retired from the list of names after it became the first major hurricane to affect Baja California in 25 years. At that same meeting, the name Isis—last used during the 2004 season—was preemptively removed from the list of names for 2016; it was deemed inappropriate to be used because of the Islamic extremist militant group which was then called by the same name.

Name	Dates active	Peak classification	Sustained wind speeds	Pressure	Areas affected	Damage (USD)	Deaths	Refs
Hazel (Note: The name Hazel was retired for unclear reasons. Therefore, no storm data is shown.)	Not available	Not available	Not available	Not available	Not available	Not available	Not available	
Adele (Note: The name Adele was retired for unclear reasons. Therefore, no storm data is shown.)	Not available	Not available	Not available	Not available	Not available	Not available	Not available	
Fico (Note: The name Fico was retired for unknown reasons. Therefore, no storm data is shown.)	Not available	Not available	Not available	Not available	Not available	Not available	Not available	
Knut (Note: The name Knut was retired for unknown reasons. Therefore, no storm data is shown.)	Not available	Not available	Not available	Not available	Not available	Not available	Not available	
Iva (Note: The name Iva was retired because its pronunciation is similar to Iwa, a retired name. Therefore, no storm data is shown.)	Not available	Not available	Not available	Not available	Not available	Not available	Not available	
Fefa (Note: The name Fefa was retired for unknown reasons. Therefore, no storm data is shown.)	Not available	Not available	Not available	Not available	Not available	Not available	Not available	
Ismael	September 12 – 16, 1995	Category 1 hurricane	80 mph (130 km/h)	983 hPa (29.03 inHg)	Northern Mexico	$26 million	116	
Pauline	October 5 – 10, 1997	Category 4 hurricane	130 mph (215 km/h)	948 hPa (27.99 inHg)	Oaxaca, Guerrero	$448 million	230-400	
Israel (Note: Intended to replace the name Ismael, the name Israel was retired for political reasons before it could be used. Therefore, no storm data is shown.)	Not available	Not available	Not available	Not available	Not available	Not available	Not available	
Adolph (Note: The name Adolph was retired for political reasons. Therefore, no storm data is shown.)	Not available	Not available	Not available	Not available	Not available	Not available	Not available	
Kenna	October 22 – 26, 2002	Category 5 hurricane	165 mph (270 km/h)	913 hPa (26.96 inHg)	Western Mexico, Southwestern United States	$101 million	4	
Alma	May 29 – 30, 2008	Tropical storm	65 mph (100 km/h)	994 hPa (29.35 inHg)	Nicaragua	$33 million	9	
Manuel	September 13 – 19, 2013	Category 1 hurricane	75 mph (120 km/h)	983 hPa (29.03 inHg)	Western Mexico	$4.2 billion	169	
Odile	September 10 – 18, 2014	Category 4 hurricane	140 mph (220 km/h)	918 hPa (27.11 inHg)	Baja California Peninsula	$1.82 billion	18	
Isis (Note: The name Isis was retired during the WMO's annual meeting in 2015, deeming its usage inappropriate in light of the Islamic State of Iraq and Levant (which was commonly referred to as ISIS at that time). Therefore, no storm data is shown.)	Not available	Not available	Not available	Not available	Not available	Not available	Not available	
Patricia	October 20 – 24, 2015	Category 5 hurricane	215 mph (345 km/h)	872 hPa (25.75 inHg)	Central America, Mexico, Texas	$460 million	13	
Dora	July 31 – August 12, 2023	Category 4 hurricane	150 mph (240 km/h)	939 hPa (27.73 inHg)	Hawaii	None	None	–
Otis	October 22 – 25, 2023	Category 5 hurricane	165 mph (270 km/h)	922 hPa (27.23 inHg)	Guerrero	$12 billion	52	
John	September 22 – 27, 2024	Category 3 hurricane	120 mph (195 km/h)	956 hPa (28.23 inHg)	Mexico	$2.45 billion	29	–
18 names						$21.6 billion	645	

== Names retired in the Central Pacific basin ==
In the Central Pacific basin (between the International Date Line (180°) and 140°W), four names have been retired as of 2024. Hurricanes Iwa and Iniki were retired after impacting Hawaii, while Paka and Ioke were retired after affecting various islands in Micronesia. (Note: References for the Central Pacific retired names.)

Name	Dates active	Peak classification	Sustained wind speeds	Pressure	Areas affected	Damage (USD)	Deaths	Refs
Iwa	November 19 – 25, 1982	Category 1 hurricane	150 km/h (90 mph)	968 hPa (28.59 inHg)	Hawaii	$312 million	4	
Iniki	September 5 – 13, 1992	Category 4 hurricane	230 km/h (145 mph)	938 hPa (27.70 inHg)	Hawaii	$3.1 billion	7	
Paka	November 28 – December 23, 1997	Category 5 super typhoon	295 km/h (185 mph)	920 hPa (27.17 inHg)	Marshall Islands, Guam, Mariana Islands	$584 million	None	(Note: Paka reached its peak intensity in the western Pacific basin, and hence its classification is considered to be a Category 5 super typhoon, not a Category 5 hurricane. In the central Pacific, Paka peaked as a tropical storm.)
Ioke	August 20 – September 9, 2006	Category 5 hurricane	260 km/h (160 mph)	915 hPa (27.02 inHg)	Johnston Atoll, Wake Island	$88 million	None	
4 names						$4.08 billion	11	

== Retired names sorted by letter ==
Letter	Number of retired names	Retired names	Last addition
A	3	Adele, Adolph, Alma	2008 (Alma)
B	0	/	/
C	0	/	/
D	1	Dora	2023
E	0	/	/
F	2	Fefa, Fico	1991 (Fefa)
G	0	/	/
H	1	Hazel	1965
I	6	Iniki, Ioke, Isis, Ismael, Iva, Iwa	2006 (Ioke)
J	1	John	2024
K	2	Kenna, Knut	2002 (Kenna)
L	0	/	/
M	1	Manuel	2013
N	0	/	/
O	2	Odile, Otis	2023 (Otis)
P	3	Paka, Patricia, Pauline	2015 (Patricia)
R	0	/	/
S	0	/	/
T	0	/	/
V	0	/	/
W	0	/	/

== See also ==
- List of Pacific hurricanes
- List of retired Atlantic hurricane names
- List of retired Pacific typhoon names
- List of retired Philippine typhoon names
- List of retired Australian cyclone names
- List of retired South Pacific tropical cyclone names
