= Typhoon Paka =

Pacific typhoon in 1997

Typhoon Paka (Rubing)
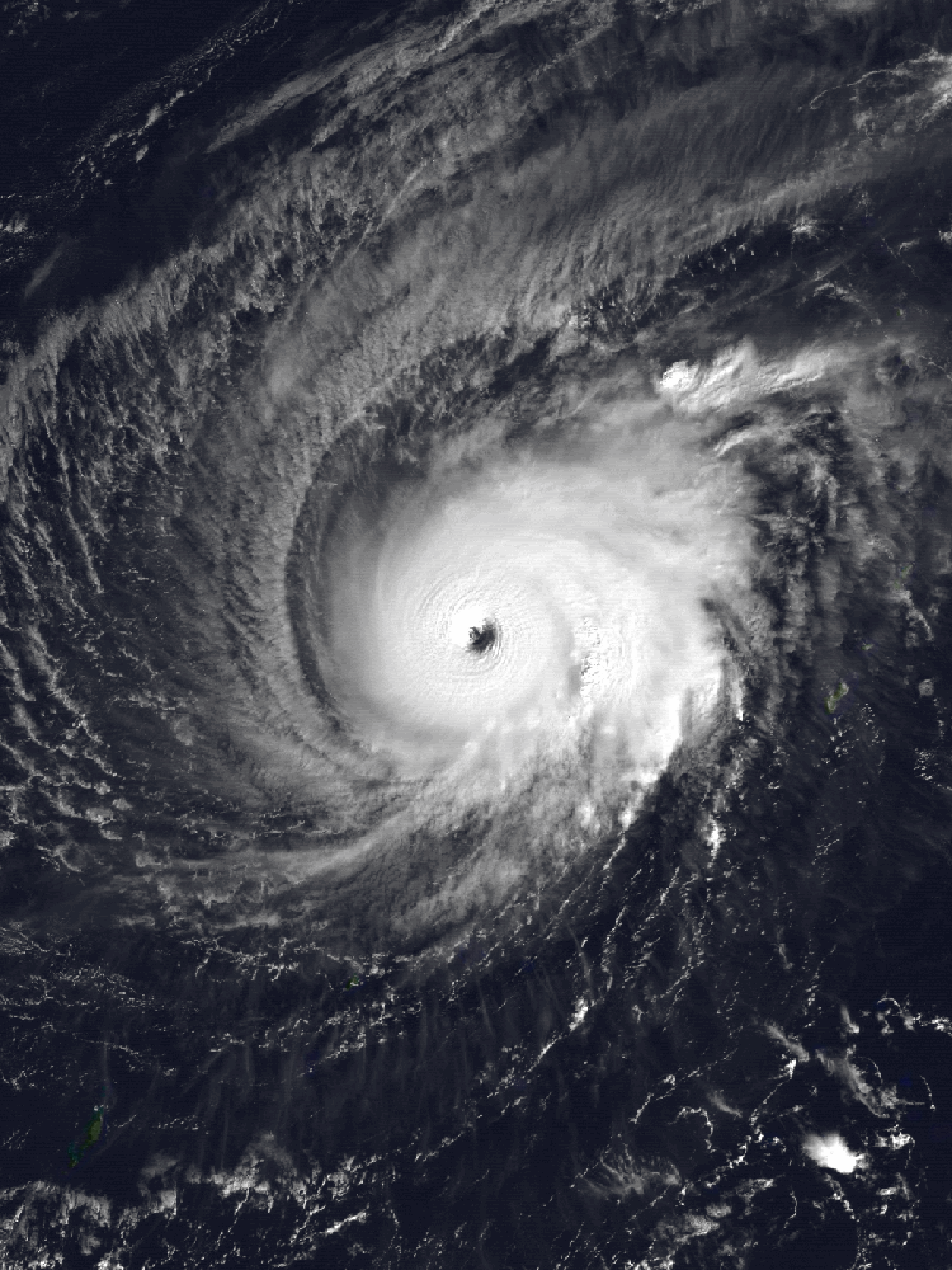
- Typhoon Paka at peak intensity on 18 December

Meteorological history
- Formed: November 28, 1997
- Dissipated: December 23, 1997

Very strong typhoon
- 10-minute sustained (JMA)
- Highest winds: 185 km/h (115 mph)
- Lowest pressure: 920 hPa (mbar); 27.17 inHg

Category 5-equivalent super typhoon
- 1-minute sustained (SSHWS/JTWC)
- Highest winds: 295 km/h (185 mph)
- Lowest pressure: 901 hPa (mbar); 26.61 inHg

Overall effects
- Fatalities: None
- Damage: $580 million (1997 USD)
- Areas affected: Marshall Islands; Mariana Islands
- IBTrACS
- Part of the 1997 Pacific hurricane and typhoon seasons

Typhoon Paka, (Note: Paka is the Hawaiian name for Pat) named Rubing by PAGASA, was an extremely powerful and long-lived storm that devastated Guam and the Marshall Islands in December 1997, produced the second-highest accumulated cyclone energy—a metric used to measure the total energy generated by tropical cyclones—of any individual cyclone on record in the basin. One of the strongest Pacific typhoons ever recorded in December, Paka was the last tropical cyclone of the 1997 Pacific hurricane season and 1997 Pacific typhoon season and the last of a record eleven super typhoons that formed in 1997. Paka developed on 28 November from a trough well to the southwest of Hawaii. The storm tracked generally westward for much of its duration, and on 7 December it crossed into the western Pacific Ocean. Much of its track was characterized by fluctuations in intensity, and on 10 December the cyclone attained typhoon status as it crossed the Marshall Islands. On 16 December, Paka struck Guam and Rota with winds of 230 km/h (140 mph), and it strengthened further to reach peak winds on 18 December over open waters as the final super typhoon of the year. Subsequently, it underwent a steady weakening trend, and on 23 December, Paka dissipated.

Typhoon Paka first impacted the Marshall Islands, where it dropped heavy rainfall and left US$80 million in damages. Later, it passed just north of Guam, where strong winds destroyed about 1,500 buildings and damaged 10,000 more; 5,000 people were left homeless, and the island experienced a complete power outage following the typhoon. Damage on the island totaled US$500 million, which warranted the retirement of its name. Paka also caused minor damage in the Northern Mariana Islands, and overall, the typhoon did not cause any reported fatalities.

== Meteorological history ==
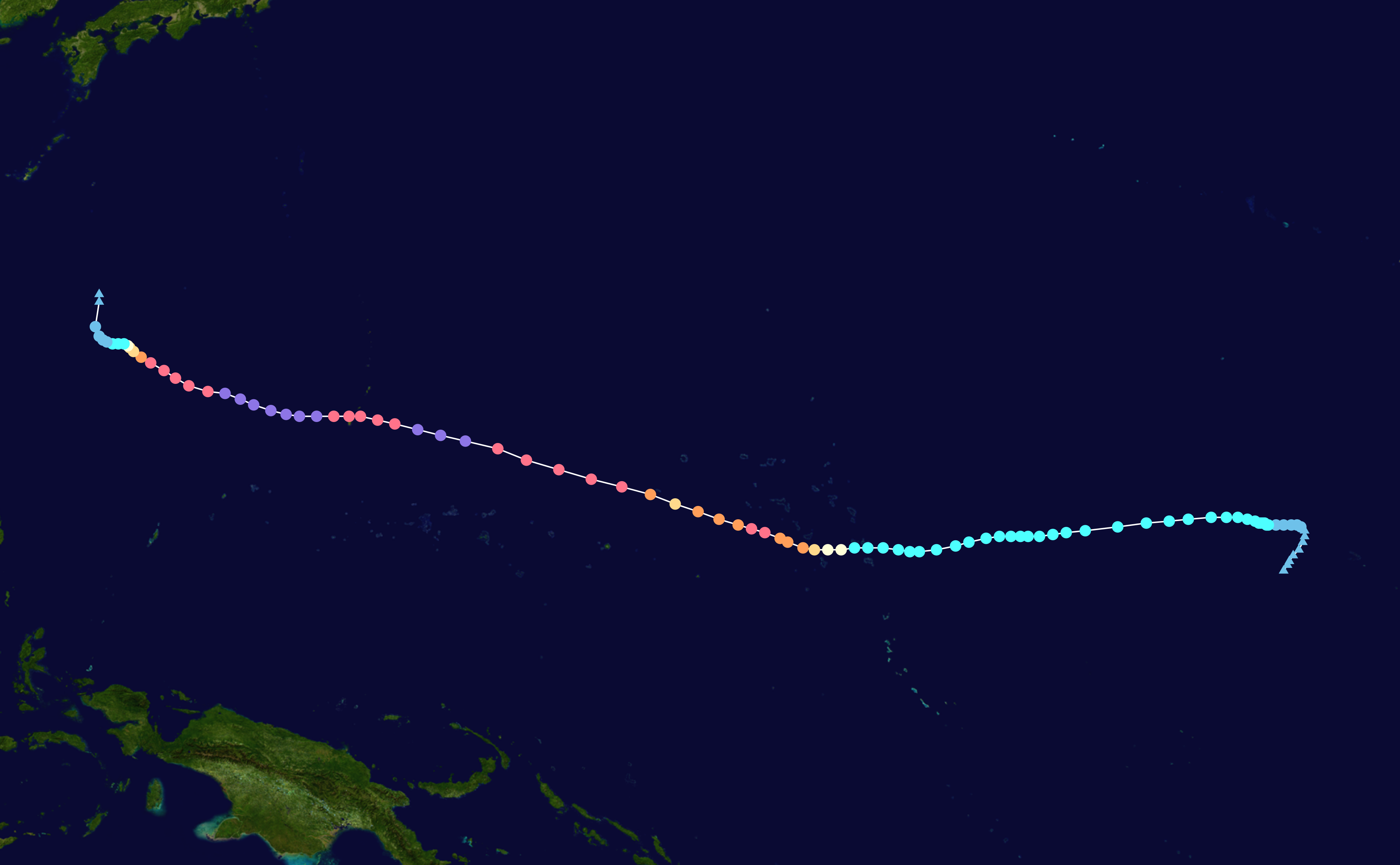
Map plotting the storm's track and intensity, according to the Saffir–Simpson scale Map key Saffir–Simpson scale Tropical depression (≤38 mph, ≤62 km/h) Tropical storm (39–73 mph, 63–118 km/h) Category 1 (74–95 mph, 119–153 km/h) Category 2 (96–110 mph, 154–177 km/h) Category 3 (111–129 mph, 178–208 km/h) Category 4 (130–156 mph, 209–251 km/h) Category 5 (≥157 mph, ≥252 km/h) Unknown Storm type Tropical cyclone Subtropical cyclone Extratropical cyclone, remnant low, tropical disturbance, or monsoon depression

As the weather synoptics of the northern Pacific Ocean transitioned into a late-fall to early winter-type pattern, convection from the monsoon trough extended to the east of the International Date Line. During late November, a westerly disturbance developed into twin troughs on opposite sides of the equator; the one in the Southern Hemisphere eventually developed into Tropical Cyclone Pam, while the one in the Northern Hemisphere formed into an area of convection about 2,000 km (1,200 mi) southwest of Hawaii. The disturbance gradually organized as it drifted north-northeastward, and on 28 November it developed into Tropical Depression Five-C about 465 km (289 mi) west-northwest of Palmyra Atoll. Operationally, the Central Pacific Hurricane Center (CPHC) did not begin issuing warnings on the system until 2 December.

The tropical depression continued drifting north-northeastward, and failed to strengthen significantly. It turned to the west on 1 December, due to the presence of a strong anticyclone to its north with a ridge extending westward past the International Date Line. On 2 December, based on satellite estimates, the CPHC upgraded the depression to Tropical Storm Paka while located about 1,000 km (620 mi) south-southeast of Johnston Atoll. Due to the presence of high clouds across the area, forecasters had difficulty at times in locating the low-level circulation. After becoming a tropical storm, Paka remained nearly stationary for about two days before resuming a slow motion to the west-southwest. It steadily intensified due to warm water temperatures, and on 3 December the storm attained winds of 105 km/h (65 mph). The next day, however, it encountered dry air and began weakening; by 6 December, the winds had decreased to minimal tropical storm status for about 12 hours. Subsequently, Paka began to re-intensify, and on 7 December the storm crossed the International Date Line into the western North Pacific Ocean with winds of 80 km/h (50 mph).

Upon entering the western North Pacific Ocean, tropical cyclone warning duties transferred from the CPHC to the Japan Meteorological Agency (JMA), and the JMA first assessed Paka as a 65 km/h (40 mph) storm. The Joint Typhoon Warning Center (JTWC) unofficially assumed warning duties for interests in the United States Department of Defense. Paka continued to intensify after crossing the date line, and from late on 7 December through early the following day it remained a strong tropical storm. However, upper-level wind shear increased, and it again weakened. At 1200 UTC on 9 December, the JTWC assessed Paka as an 85 km/h (53 mph) tropical storm and forecast it to continue weakening. By 10 December, the shear had begun to decrease as the storm moved through the Marshall Islands, and that night the JTWC upgraded Paka to typhoon status. Paka officially attained typhoon status when JMA classified it with winds of 120 km/h (75 mph) at 0000 UTC on 11 December.

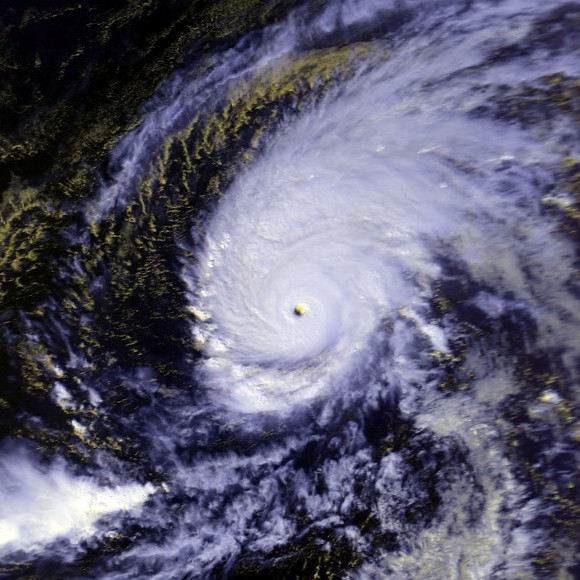
Super Typhoon Paka on 15 December

After attaining typhoon status, Paka strengthened fairly quickly, and by 12 December it reached sustained winds of 150 km/h (93 mph) for a ten-minute (10 min) duration, or 215 km/h (134 mph) over a one-minute (1 min) duration. Subsequently, it briefly weakened as its forward motion increased. However, Paka again re-intensified, and at 1200 UTC on 14 December it attained the unofficial ranking of Category 5 super typhoon status while over the open Pacific Ocean with estimated 1-minute sustained winds of 260 km/h (160 mph). At the same time, the JMA classified it with 10 min sustained winds of 175 km/h (109 mph). After reaching its initial peak intensity, Paka underwent an eyewall replacement cycle and began weakening as it approached the southern Mariana Islands; the NEXRAD Doppler weather radar from Guam revealed the presence of a primary eyewall of 74 km (46 mi) in diameter, with a fragmented inner wall cloud of 19 km (12 mi) in diameter. Additionally, satellite imagery indicated an eyewall mesovortex within the eye of the typhoon. It slowed and began to re-intensify as it continued westward, and at 0530 UTC on 16 December the northern portion of the outer eyewall of Paka passed over the island of Rota; 20 minutes later, the southern portion of the inner wall cloud moved across northern Guam. As it tracked through the Rota Channel, the center of Paka passed about 8 km (5.0 mi) north of the northern tip of Guam, its closest approach to the island.

Typhoon Paka continued to steadily intensify after passing the Marianas Islands, and late on 17 December it reached its peak intensity of 185 km/h (115 mph) 10 min sustained) while located 440 km (270 mi) west-northwest of Guam. Early on 18 December, the JTWC assessed it as attaining peak winds of 295 km/h (183 mph) 1 min winds). On 19 December, it entered the area of responsibility of the Philippine Atmospheric, Geophysical and Astronomical Services Administration, or PAGASA, and was named Rubing. Shortly thereafter, Paka moved through an area of progressively increasing wind shear, which resulted in a steady weakening trend. By 21 December, winds decreased to tropical storm status. The next day, it degenerated into a tropical depression before it dissipated on 23 December.

== Preparations and impact ==
=== Marshall Islands ===
Prior to the typhoon passing through the Marshall Islands, several hundred residents on the island of Ebeye fled to safer structures. The threat of Paka prevented Continental Micronesia from flying in or out of the area.

Paka entered the Marshall Islands between Mili and Majuro as a tropical storm on 10 December, and after strengthening into a typhoon, it left the archipelago on 14 December. The cyclone affected several islands in the nation, and the Majuro and Kwajalein atolls reported wind gusts in excess of 75 km/h (47 mph). On Jaluit Atoll, the typhoon dropped 217 mm (8.5 in) of precipitation in six hours, with a total of about 300 mm (12 in) recorded in 30 hours. Strong waves inundated low-lying islands, which flooded crops with salt water. The combination of the wind and flooding caused severe damage to banana, papaya, and lime trees across the territory. Typhoon Paka damaged 70% of the houses on Ailinglaplap Atoll, and most of the coconut trees on the atoll were left toppled or damaged. Strong winds left large portions of Ebeye island without electricity or telephone. The typhoon caused no reported deaths or injuries in the region, and damage was estimated at US$80 million.

=== Guam ===
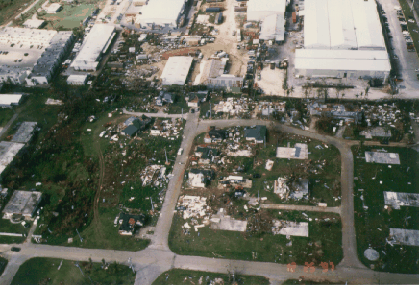
Damage on Guam

The Guam National Weather Service issued a typhoon watch on 14 December, which was upgraded to a typhoon warning the next day. The Antonio B. Won Pat International Airport was closed during the passage of Paka, with only emergency flights permitted.

Passing a short distance north of the island, Typhoon Paka produced strong winds across northern Guam, though reliable wind reports are incomplete due to the long duration and intensity of the winds. The highest reading believed to be reliable was at Apra Harbor. There, a station recorded a wind gust of 277 km/h (172 mph) before the sensor failed as winds shifted to the southwest; since the winds from the southwest were stronger and of greater duration, officials believe gusts there reached 297 km/h (185 mph). Additionally, Andersen Air Force Base recorded a peak wind gust of 381 km/h (237 mph), which at the time was considered the highest wind speed on record, surpassing the 1934 world record of 372 km/h (231 mph) on Mount Washington in New Hampshire. However, a subsequent wind survey of the area discarded the reading at the base, as it was considered unreliable. As microbarographs are less exposed than wind sensors, pressure readings on the island are considered accurate; the lowest reading on the island was 948 hPa (27.99 inHg) at Andersen Air Force Base. In two days, the typhoon dropped about 533 mm (21.0 in) of precipitation on the northern portion of the island, or about 89% of the monthly rainfall total. Waves along northern Guam reached about 11 m (36 ft) in height.

The strong winds from Paka left around 1,500 buildings destroyed on the island, of which 1,160 were single-family homes. A further 10,000 buildings sustained damage to some degree, with 60% of the homes on the island reporting major damage. In all, about 5,000 people were left homeless due to the typhoon. Additionally, an estimated 30–40% of the public buildings received major damage. Buildings on the island made of reinforced concrete fared well, as opposed to light metal-frame structures, which more often than not were destroyed. Large tourist hotels near Hagåtña, on which Guam is dependent, received generally minor damage, such as broken windows and damaged power generators.

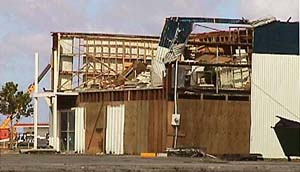
A damaged business at Agaña

A complete island-wide power outage followed the typhoon; damage to the main electrical transmission and distribution system was estimated at USD16 million. Following the passage of the typhoon, 25% of the homes on Guam were left without water. Telephone service remained working after the storm, due to most lines being underground. Strong waves washed away a few coastal roads in the northern portion of the island, leaving them temporarily closed. The waves surpassed the seawall at Apra Harbor, damaging the road and infrastructure of the seaport; many boats were washed ashore after breaking from their moorings. Strong winds damaged a radar system and lights along the runway of the Antonio B. Won Pat International Airport, though most airport facilities received light damage. Andersen Air Force Base also sustained heavy damage, with hundreds of downed trees and many facilities left damaged. Across Guam, damage was estimated at USD500 million. About 100 people were injured, but the typhoon caused no deaths on the island.

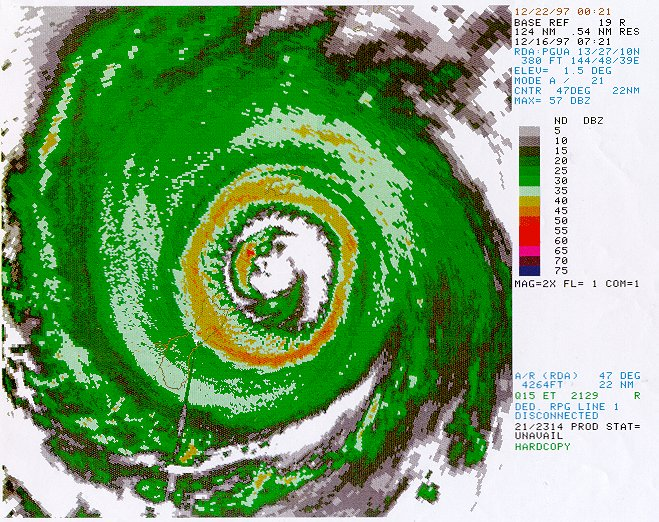
NEXRAD image of Typhoon Paka from Guam

=== Northern Mariana Islands ===
A typhoon watch was issued for Rota, Tinian, and Saipan on 14 December, which was upgraded to a typhoon warning the next day. Because Paka was intensifying while passing to the south of Rota, the first wind, or northeast through east winds, was less severe than the second wind from the southeast. Sustained winds on the island reached 145 km/h (90 mph), with gusts reaching 185 km/h (115 mph). Many trees in the mountainous portion of the island were left defoliated, which limited nesting and foraging sites for the endangered bridled white-eye bird. While passing to the south of the island, Paka dropped 250–300 mm (9.8–11.8 in) of rain. Damage on the island totaled $4.4 million (1997 USD, $6.4 million 2015 USD). The typhoon also produced above-normal precipitation on Saipan.

== Aftermath ==
Following the passage of the typhoon in the Ailinglaplap Atoll in the Marshall Islands, residents experienced severe food shortages due to damaged crops and little rainfall. Experts estimated the entire redevelopment of its fauna would require more than a decade. As a result of the crop shortage, large-scale evacuations of the islands' residents were considered. Officials in the nation requested assistance from the Federal Emergency Management Agency of the United States, and on 20 March 1998, the area was declared a disaster area; the declaration allowed for the usage of emergency funds.

On 17 December 1997, President Bill Clinton declared Guam a federal disaster area, making it eligible for federal assistance. One week later, a disaster declaration was ordered for the Northern Mariana Islands. Ultimately, FEMA received 14,770 Individual Assistance Applications from residents on Guam. In turn, FEMA provided the residents with over $27 million in assistance (1997 USD, $39 million 2015 USD). The entire island of Guam was left without power after Paka. Water and sewage systems on Guam were directly affected minimally by the typhoon. With the usage of power generators, most areas of the island had water pumping capabilities within a few days after the typhoon. The Antonio B. Won Pat International Airport was partially reopened to daytime flights a day after the typhoon, and by a week after the passage of Paka the airport was fully re-opened.

=== Retirement ===
Due to the typhoon's impacts on Guam, the World Meteorological Organization later retired the name Paka from future use in the central North Pacific. The name Pama was chosen as its replacement.

== See also ==
- 1997–98 El Niño event
- List of off-season Pacific hurricanes
- Typhoon Gay (1992)
- Typhoon Keith
- Typhoon Oliwa
