= Tommy Iva =

Malagasy footballer (born 2000)

Personal information
- Full name: Tommy Régis Iva
- Date of birth: 2 June 2000 (age 26)
- Place of birth: Saint-Malo, France
- Height: 1.79 m (5 ft 10 in)
- Position: Winger

Team information
- Current team: Créteil
- Number: 19

Youth career
- 2005–2012: La Jacques Cartier
- 2012–2019: Saint-Malo

Senior career*
Years	Team	Apps	(Gls)
2019–2023	Saint-Malo	74	(6)
2023–2024	Le Puy	17	(4)
2024–2025	Orléans II	5	(0)
2024–2025	Orléans	15	(2)
2025–	Créteil	7	(1)

International career^{‡}
2025–	Madagascar	3	(0)
- * Club domestic league appearances and goals as of 17 October 2025 ‡ National team caps and goals as of 13:13, 18 June 2025 (UTC)

Tommy Régis Iva (born 2 June 2000) is a professional footballer who plays as a winger for Championnat National 1 club Créteil. Born in France, he plays for the Madagascar national team.

== Club career ==
A youth product of La Jacques Cartier, Iva joined the youth academy of Saint-Malo at the age of 12 and worked his way up their youth academy, before debuting with their senior team in 2019. On 19 July 2023, he transferred to the Championnat National 2 club Le Puy. On 12 June 2024, he transferred to the Championnat National club Orléans on a 2-year contract.

== International career ==
Born in France, Iva is of Malagasy descent. He made his senior and professional debut with Madagascar in a 4–1 2026 FIFA World Cup qualification win over Central African Republic on 19 March 2025.
