= A4A =

A4A may refer to:

- Adam4Adam, a gay dating service
- Airlines for America, an industry association in the US
- Apps4Africa, an African innovation accelerator
