= 1968–69 Australian region cyclone season =

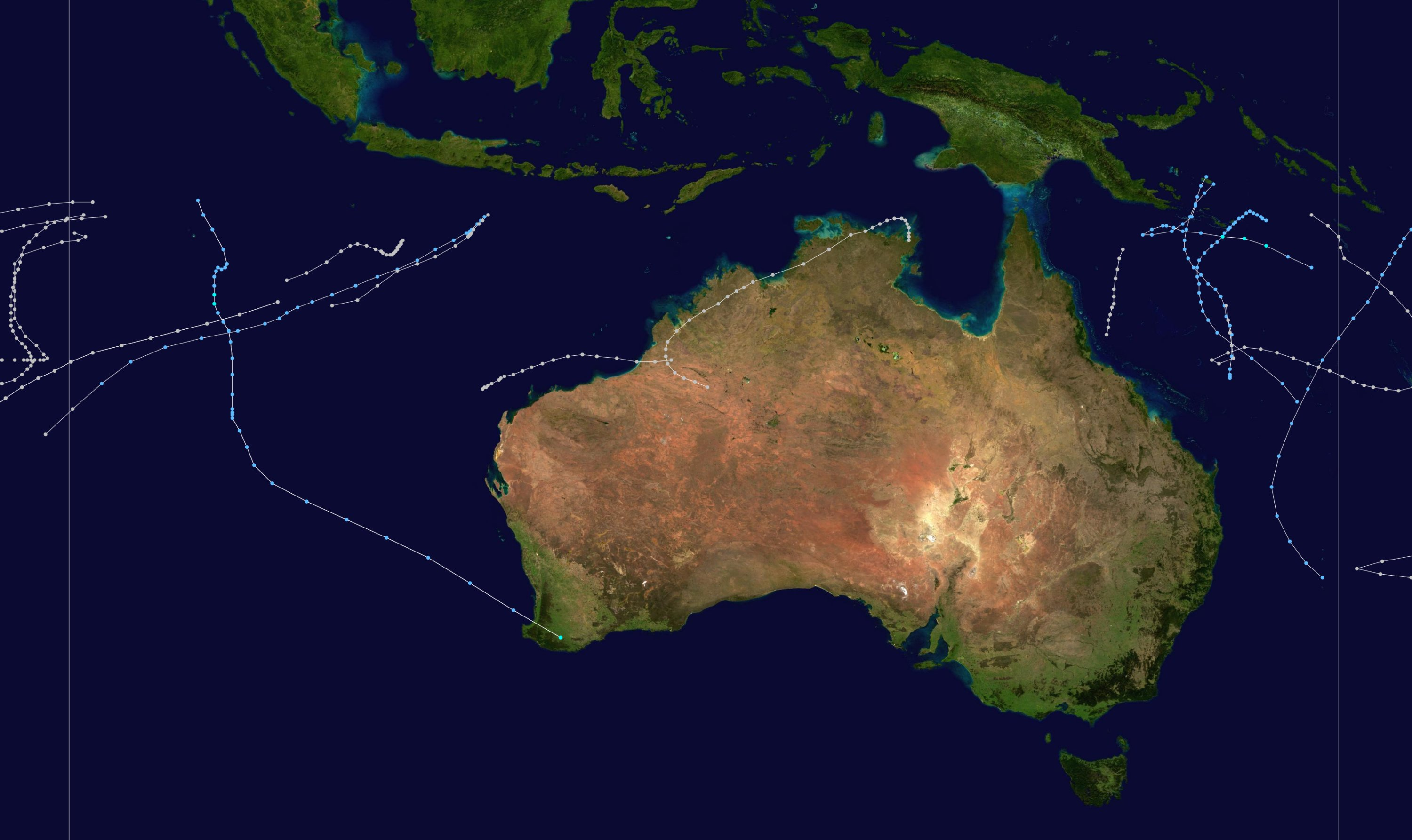
- Season summary map

Seasonal boundaries
- First system formed: 22 November 1968
- Last system dissipated: 30 April 1969

Strongest storm
- By maximum sustained winds: Amber
  - Maximum winds: 130 km/h (80 mph)
  - Lowest pressure: 977 hPa (mbar)
- By central pressure: Audrey-Bonnie
  - Maximum winds: 110 km/h (70 mph)
  - Lowest pressure: 975 hPa (mbar)

Seasonal statistics
- Tropical lows: 15
- Tropical cyclones: 13
- Severe tropical cyclones: 1
- Total fatalities: Unknown
- Total damage: Unknown

Related articles
- 1968–69 South Pacific cyclone season; 1968–69 South-West Indian Ocean cyclone season

The 1968–69 Australian region cyclone season was an above-average tropical cyclone season, featuring 15 tropical lows, of which 12 of them are named. Amber was the only hurricane-strength tropical cyclone of the season, however, it did not affect any landmasses. It ran from 1 November 1968 to 30 April 1969, with the regional tropical cyclone operational plan defining a "tropical cyclone year" separately from a "tropical cyclone season", with the "tropical cyclone year" for this season lasting from 1 July 1968 to 30 June 1969.

== Systems ==
=== Tropical Cyclone Adele ===
- Tropical low (Australian scale)
- Tropical storm (SSHWS)
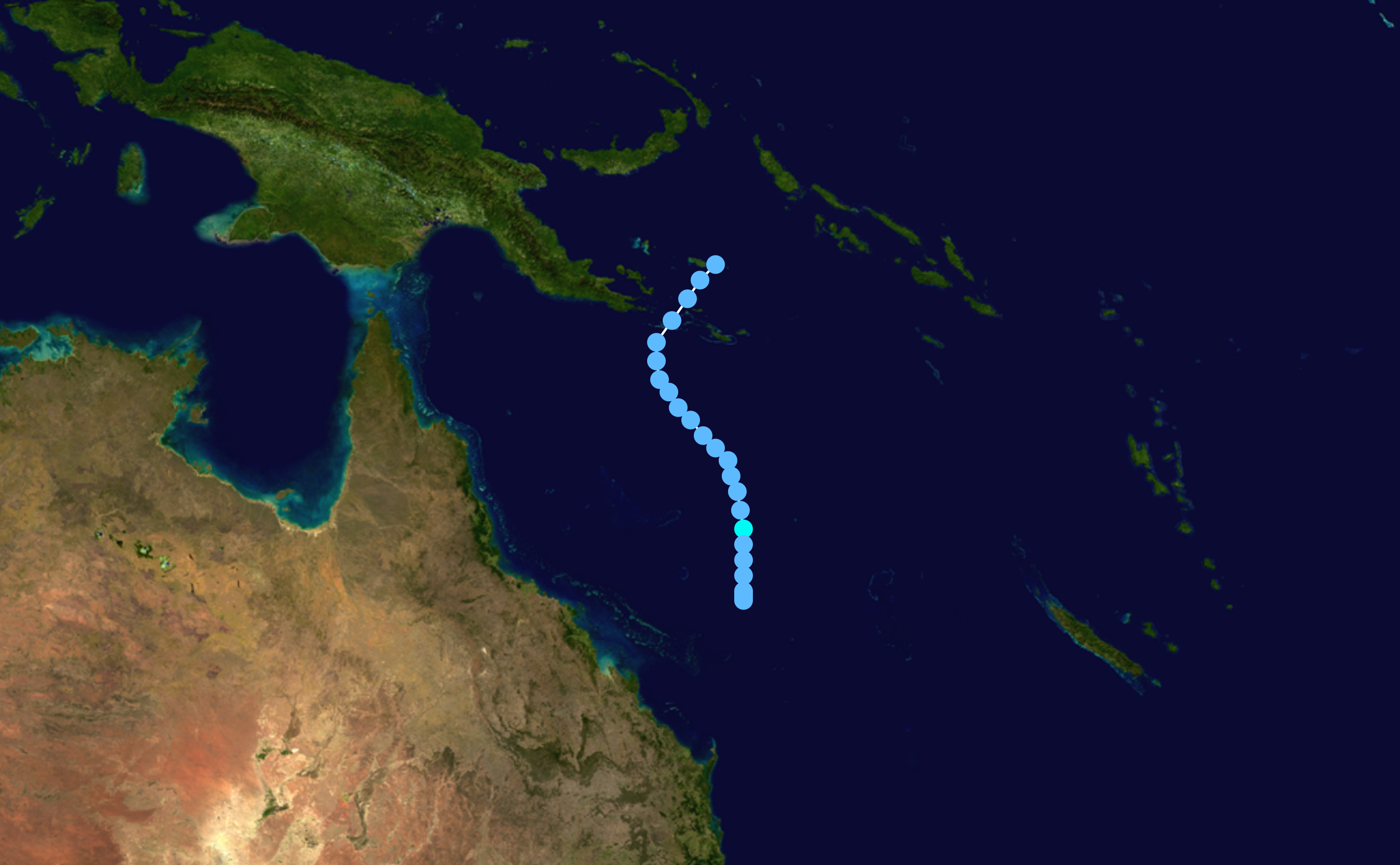
- Duration: November 22 – November 29
- Peak intensity: 65 km/h (40 mph) (1-min); 998 hPa (mbar)

On November 22, a tropical depression formed near Papua New Guinea and moved to the southwest. It failed to strengthen until the 27th of November when it briefly reached tropical storm status and was named Adele. The storm then weakened and dissipated the next day.

=== Severe Tropical Cyclone Amber ===
- Category 1 tropical cyclone (SSHWS)
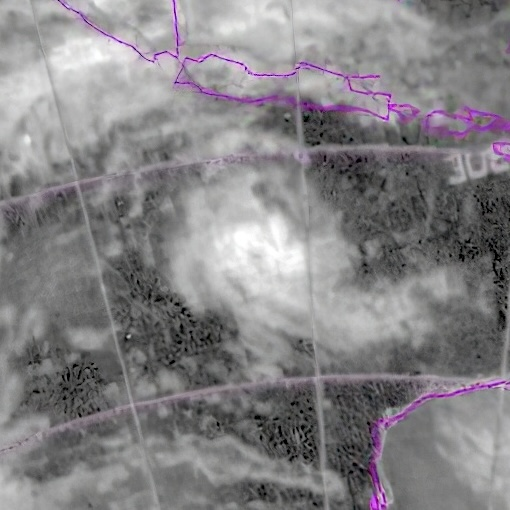
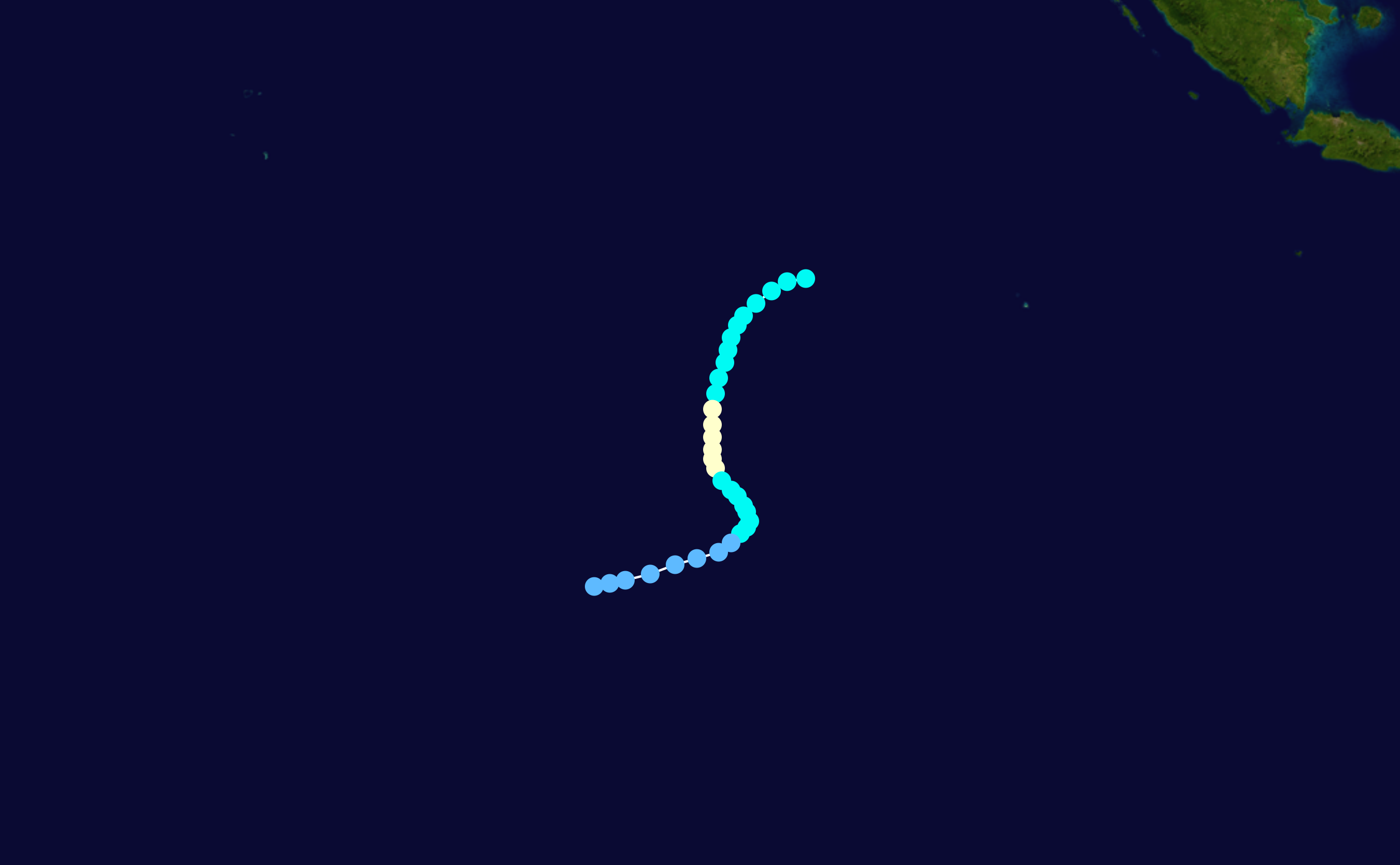
- Duration: December 16 – December 22
- Peak intensity: 130 km/h (80 mph) (1-min); 977 hPa (mbar)

On December 19, a tropical low developed to the southwest of Jakarta. It further strengthened to a tropical cyclone, earning the name Amber. It briefly reached Category 1-equivalent hurricane before weakening. It was last noted on December 22.

=== Tropical Cyclone Beatie ===
- Tropical depression (SSHWS)
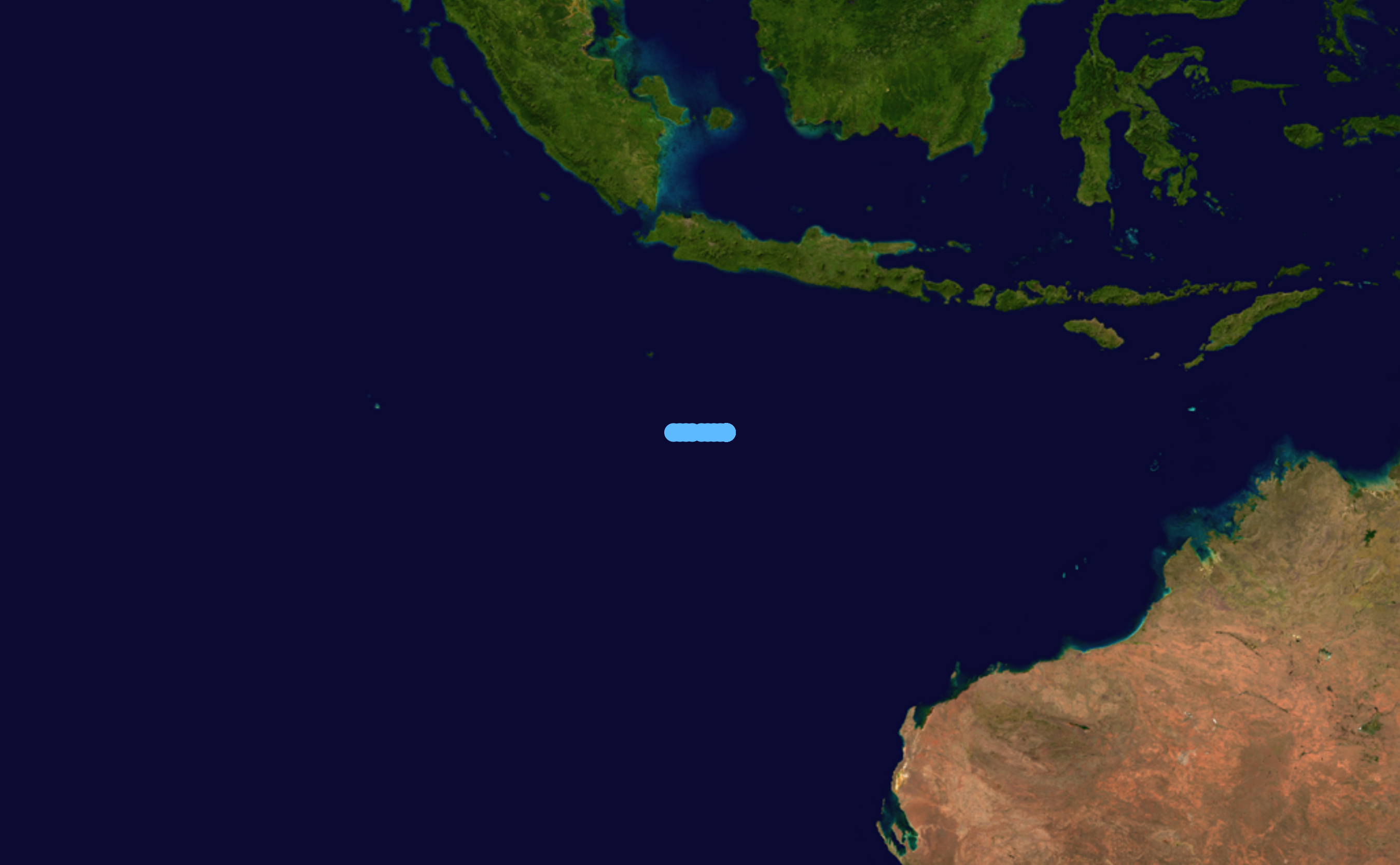
- Duration: December 19 – December 24
- Peak intensity: 45 km/h (30 mph) (1-min); 1001 hPa (mbar)

Beatie was a weak tropical cyclone that originated to the south of Java. It moved westward, passing to the south of Christmas Island. It remained weak until it dissipated on December 24.

=== Tropical Cyclone Bettina-Berthe ===
- Tropical storm (SSHWS)
- Duration: December 26 – December 27 (Exited basin)
- Peak intensity: 85 km/h (50 mph) (1-min);

A tropical low to the west of Cocos Islands strengthened to Tropical Cyclone Bettina. However, it exited the basin towards the South-West Indian Ocean basin, early the next day.

=== Tropical Cyclone Cheri ===
- Tropical storm (SSHWS)
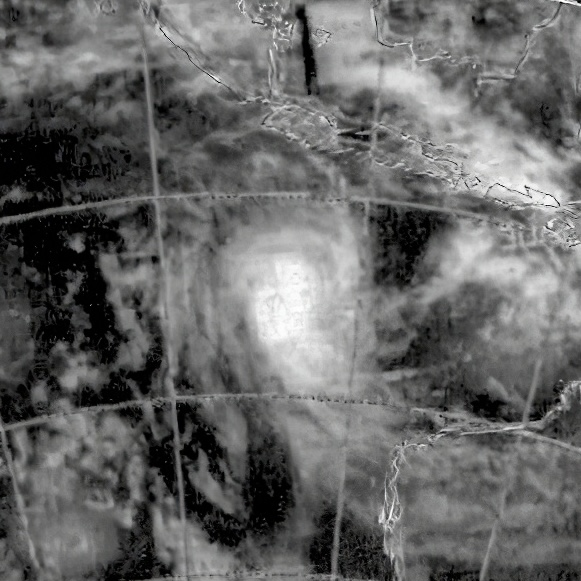
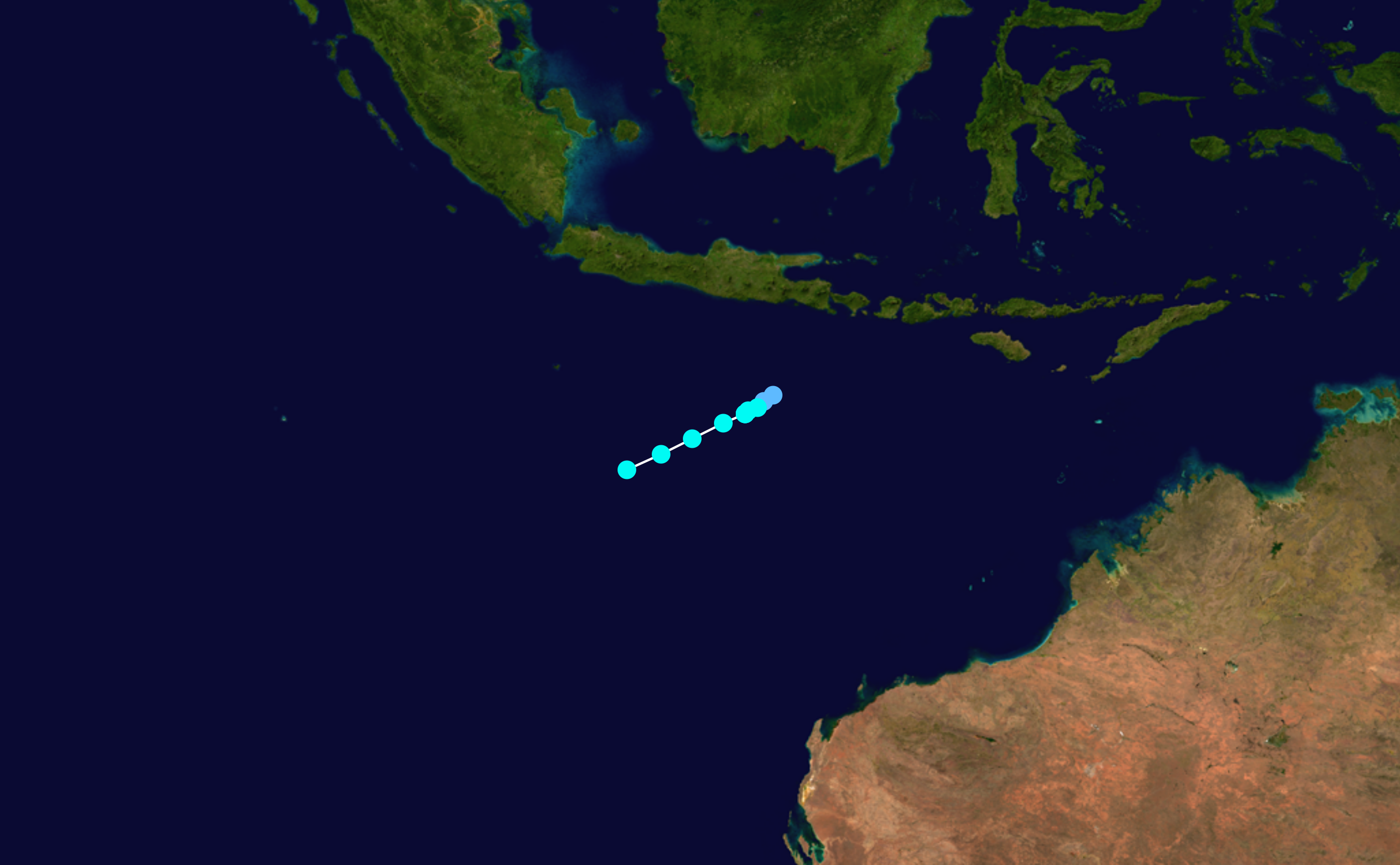
- Duration: December 27 – December 30
- Peak intensity: 75 km/h (45 mph) (1-min); 995 hPa (mbar)

Cheri was first noted on December 27 forming to the west of Christmas Island. It briefly strengthened to a Category 1 tropical cyclone before it was last noted dissipating on December 30.

=== Tropical Low Bridget ===
- Tropical low (Australian scale)
- Tropical depression (SSHWS)
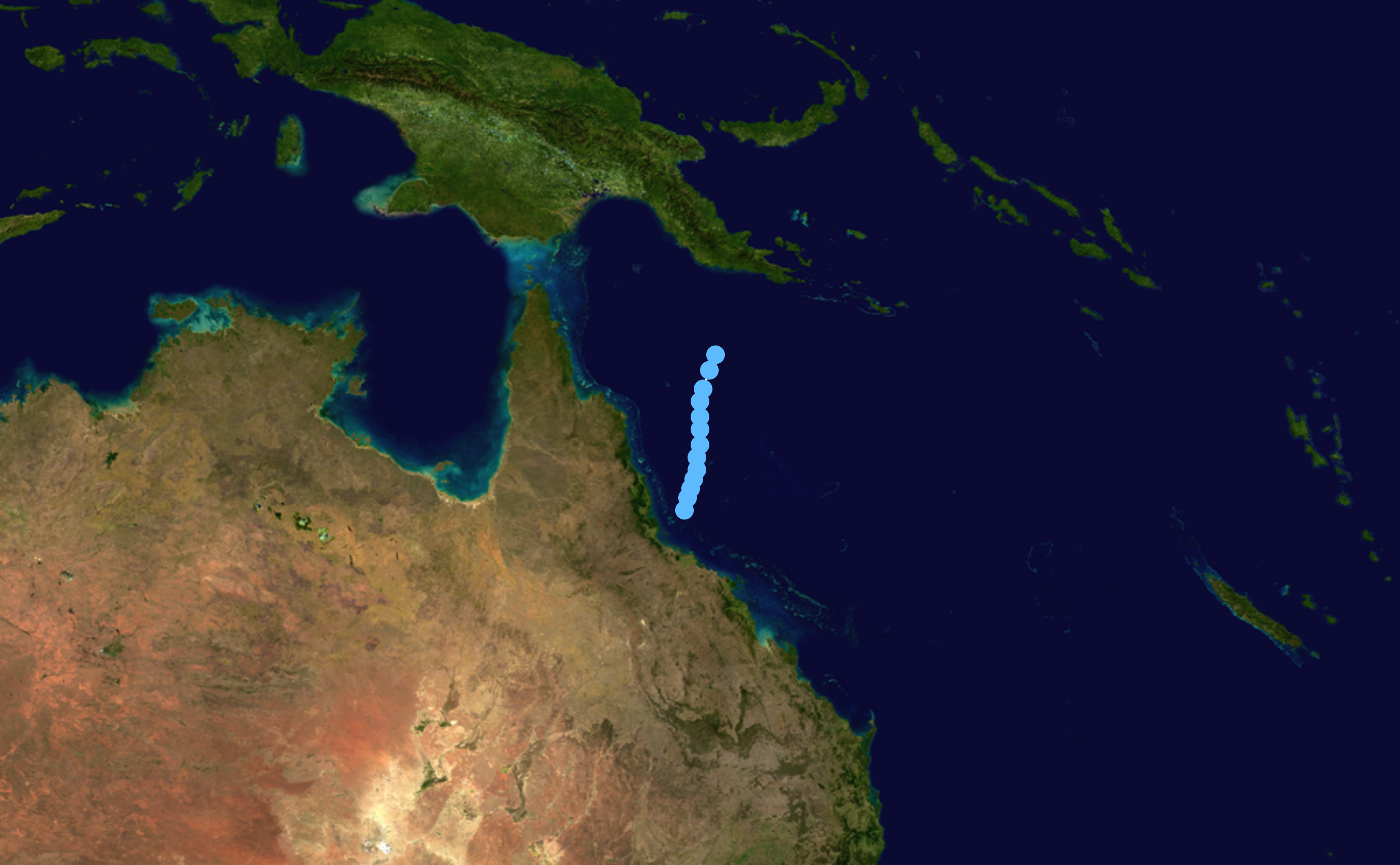
- Duration: January 24 – January 26
- Peak intensity: 45 km/h (30 mph) (1-min); 1002 hPa (mbar)

Another weak cyclone, Bridget was seen developing to the south of Papua New Guinea. It moved to the south before it was last noted to the north of Townsville.

=== Tropical Cyclone Colleen ===
- Tropical storm (SSHWS)
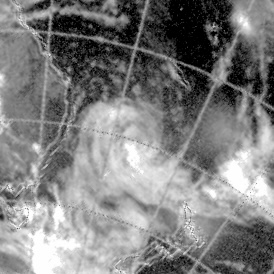
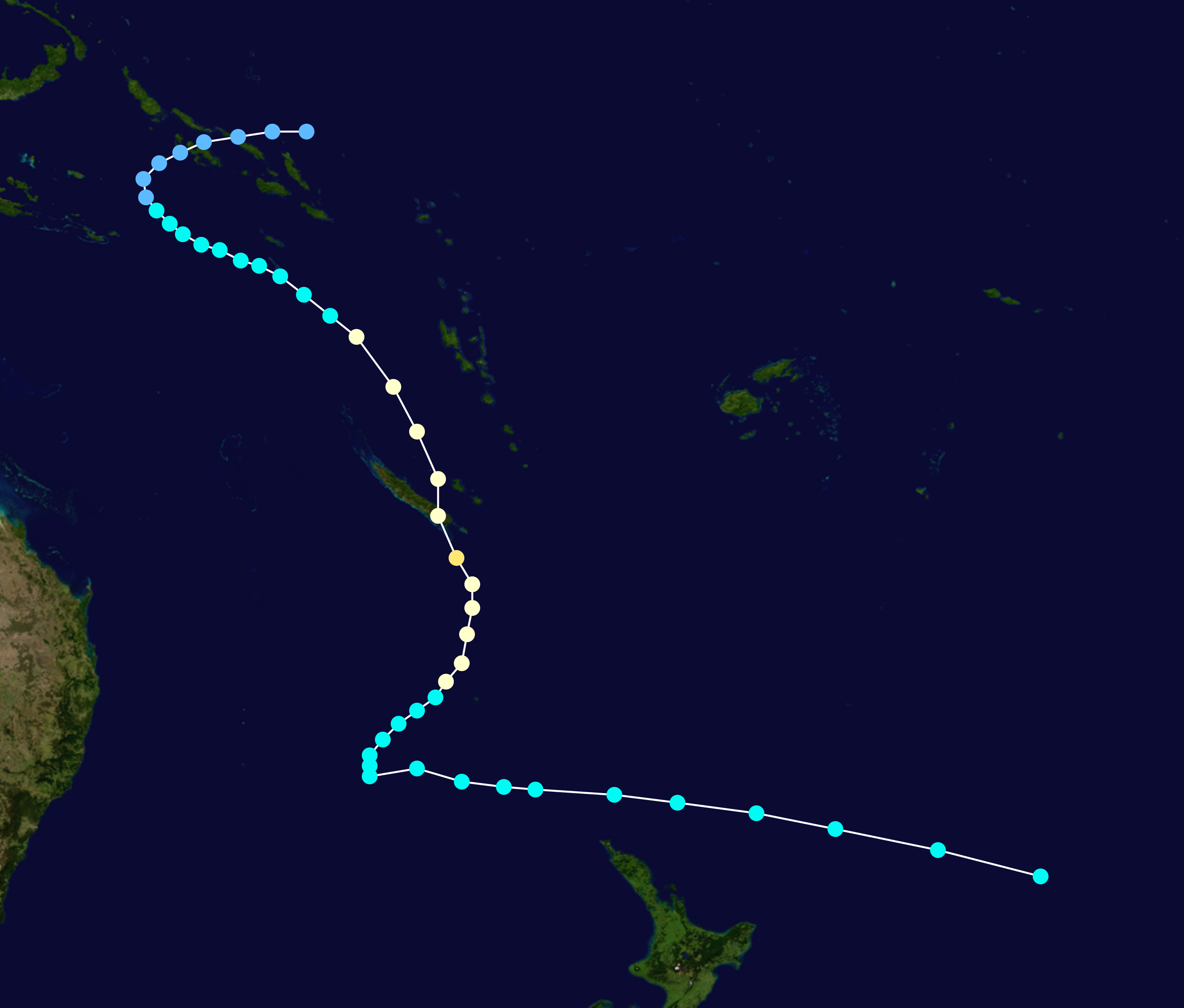
- Duration: January 27 – February 5 (Exited basin) (Out of basin on 28 January–4 February)
- Peak intensity: 100 km/h (65 mph) (1-min); 984 hPa (mbar)

A tropical low was noted forming near the Solomon Islands on January 27. It failed to develop and moved into the South Pacific basin, where it was named Colleen before striking New Caledonia. It entered the basin again on February 4; however, it wasn't renamed. It reexited the region, the next day, shortly before transitioning to an extratropical cyclone.

=== Tropical Cyclone Gladys ===
- Tropical storm (SSHWS)
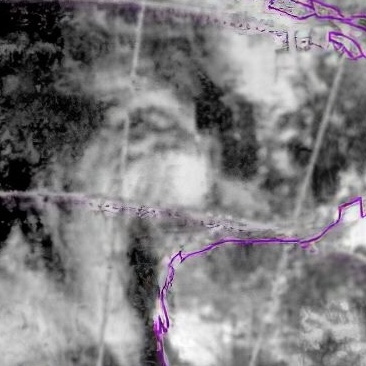
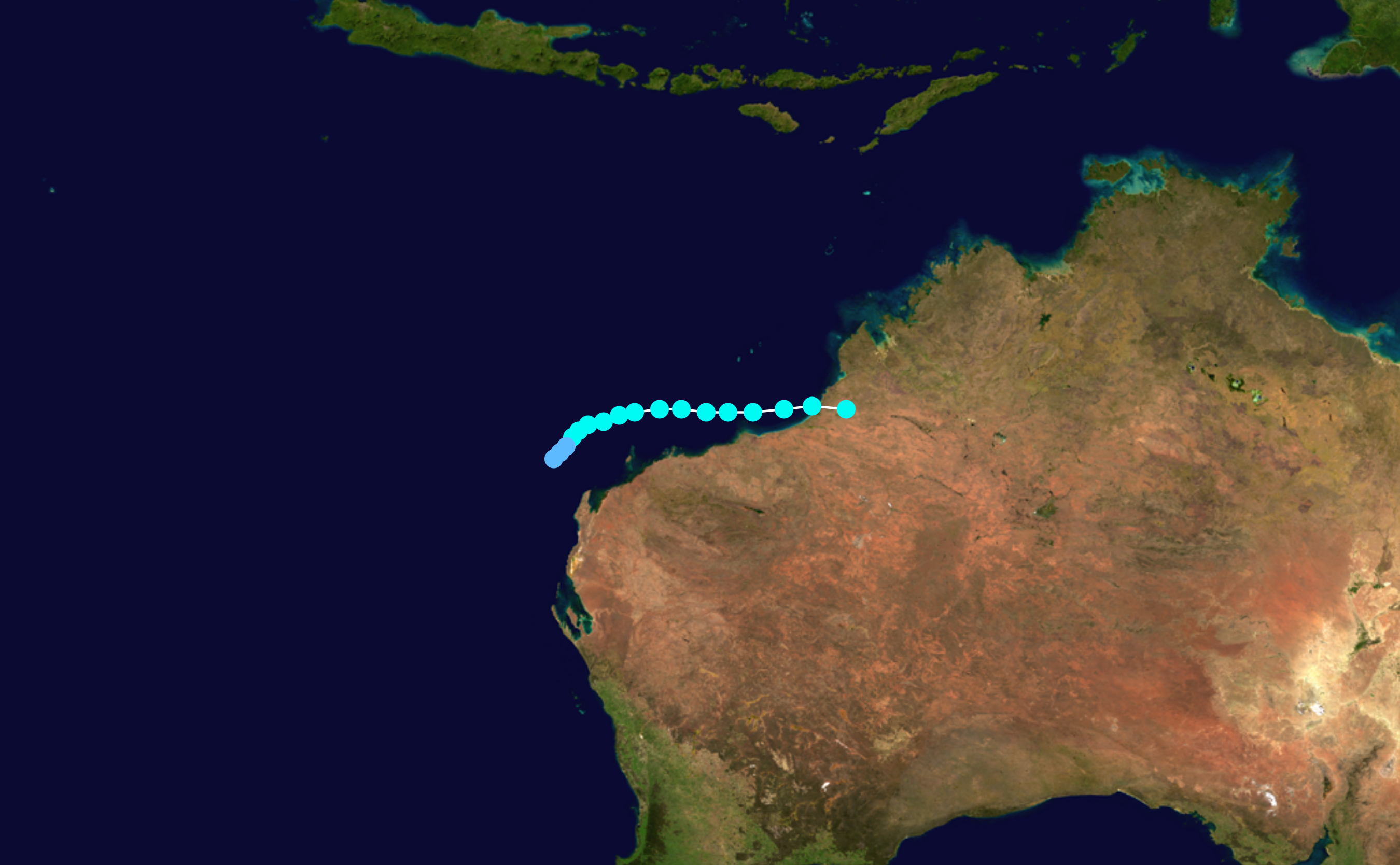
- Duration: February 15 – February 20
- Peak intensity: 95 km/h (60 mph) (1-min); 987 hPa (mbar)

Gladys formed over Western Australia, to the south-southwest of Derby. It moved offshore on the same day and moved to the west before it was last noted dissipating to the north-northwest of Exmouth.

=== Tropical Cyclone Irene ===
- Tropical storm (SSHWS)
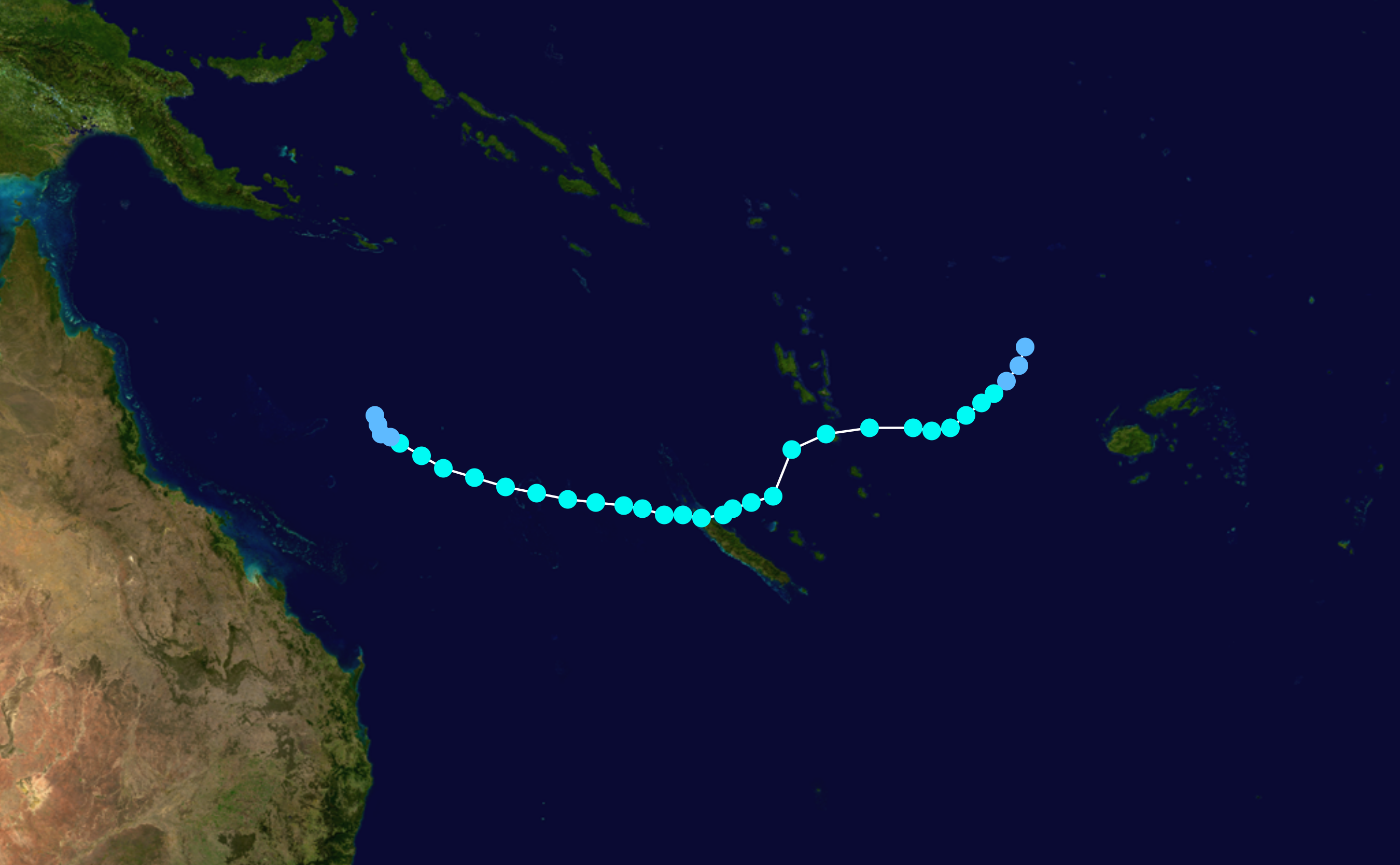
- Duration: February 21 (Entered basin) – February 24
- Peak intensity: 75 km/h (45 mph) (1-min); 990 hPa (mbar)

The weakening Irene from the South Pacific basin entered the region on February 21. The storm weakened as it executed a loop before it was last noted on February 24 to the east of Cairns.

=== Tropical Cyclone Audrey-Bonnie ===
- Tropical storm (SSHWS)
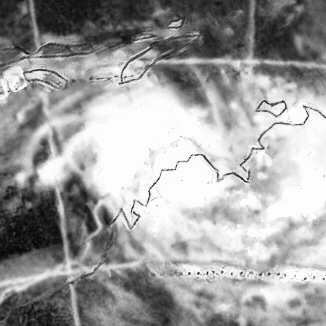
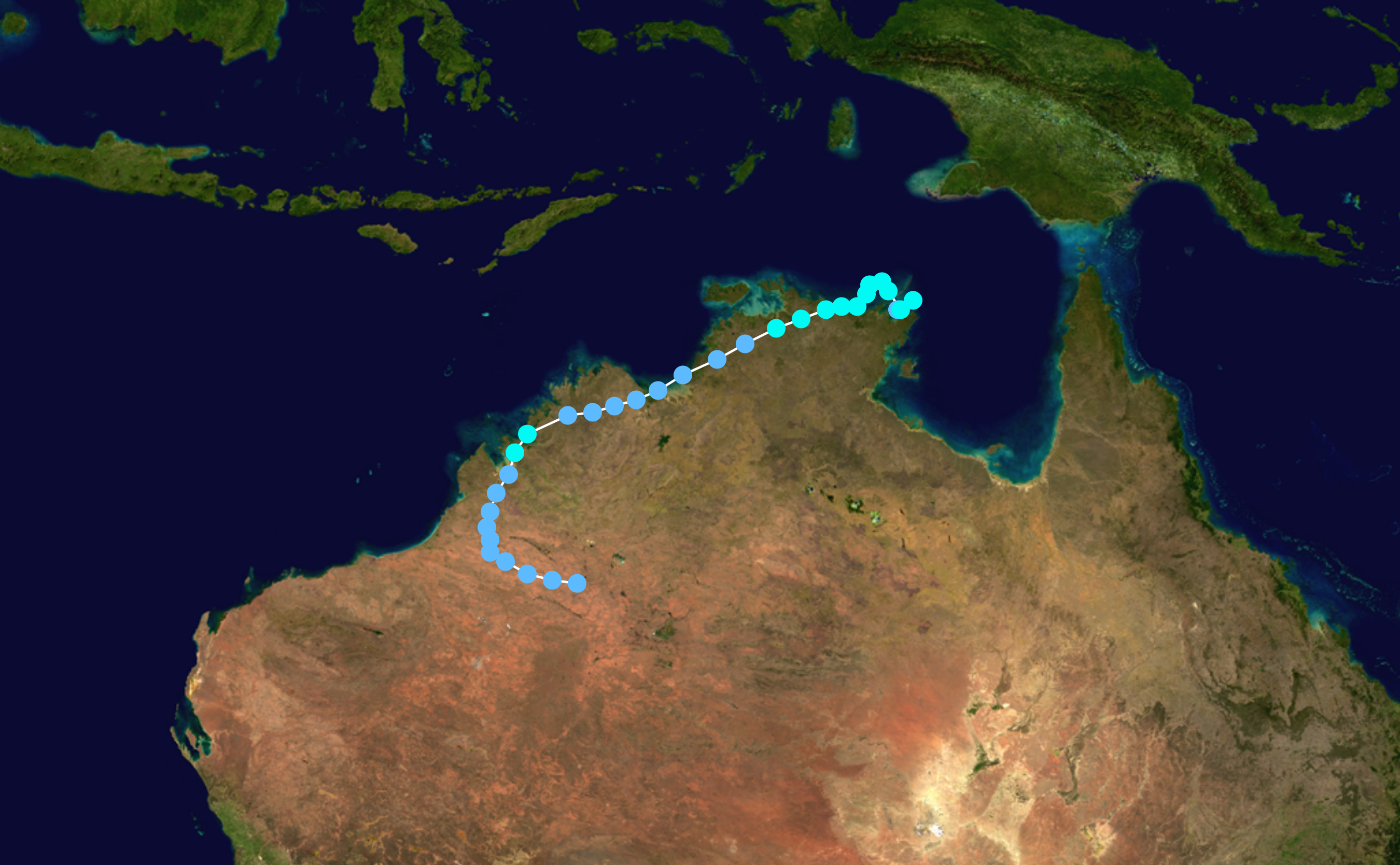
- Duration: March 1 – March 9
- Peak intensity: 110 km/h (70 mph) (1-min); 975 hPa (mbar)

A tropical low developed to become Tropical Cyclone Audrey on March 1. However, it made landfall near Maningrida on March 3. It weakened inland as it moved southwestward; however, it regenerated to a tropical cyclone to the northwest of Broome, with the BoM renaming the system Bonnie. It weakened again as it moved further inland, and it was last noted on March 9.

=== Tropical Cyclone Leonie ===
- Tropical storm (SSHWS)
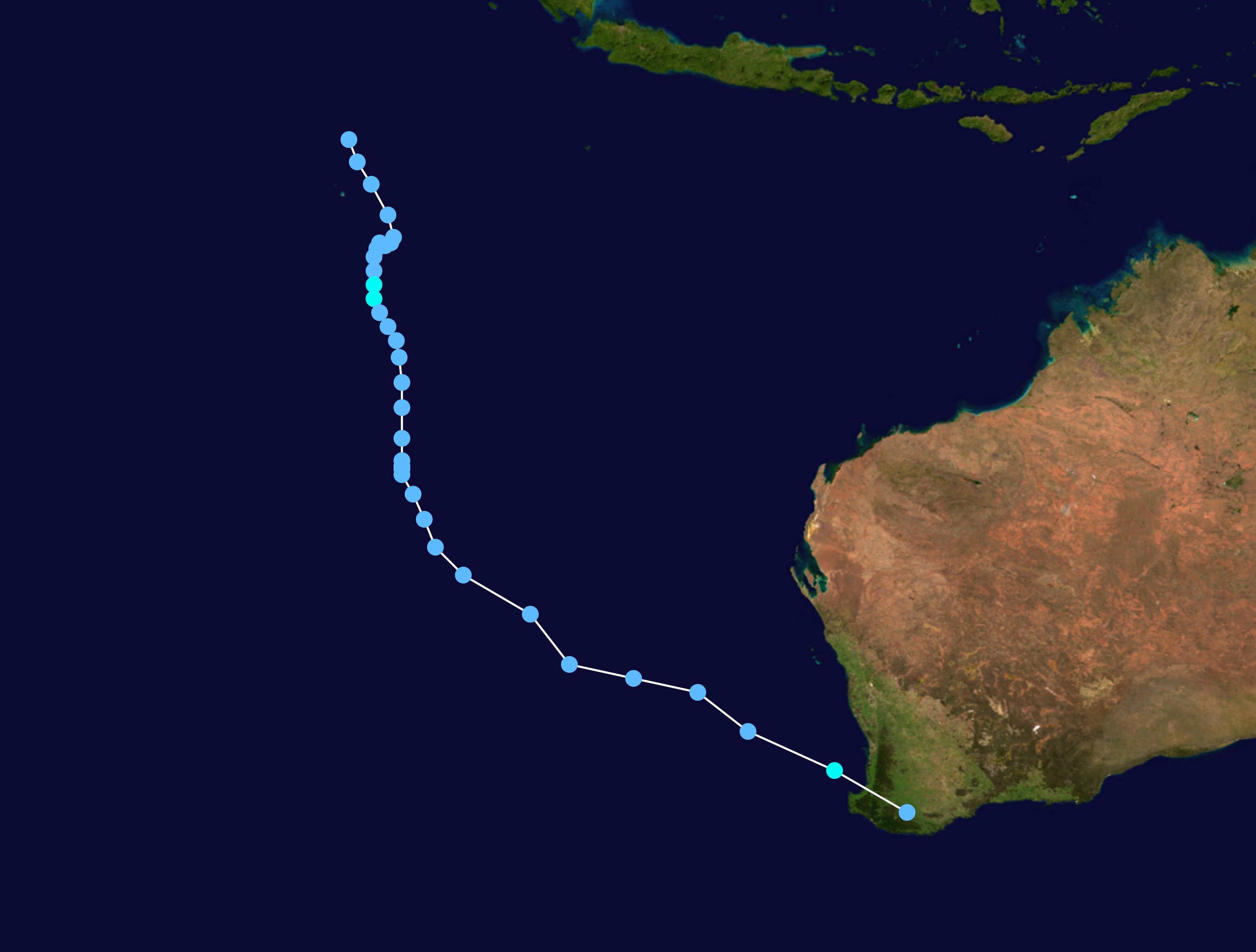
- Duration: April 5 – April 6
- Peak intensity: 65 km/h (40 mph) (1-min); 995 hPa (mbar)

Leonie developed to the north of Cocos Islands. Moving southward, the cyclone slowly weakened and transitioned to an extratropical storm before it was last noted inland, to the south of Jingalup.

=== Tropical Cyclone Esther ===
- Tropical storm (SSHWS)
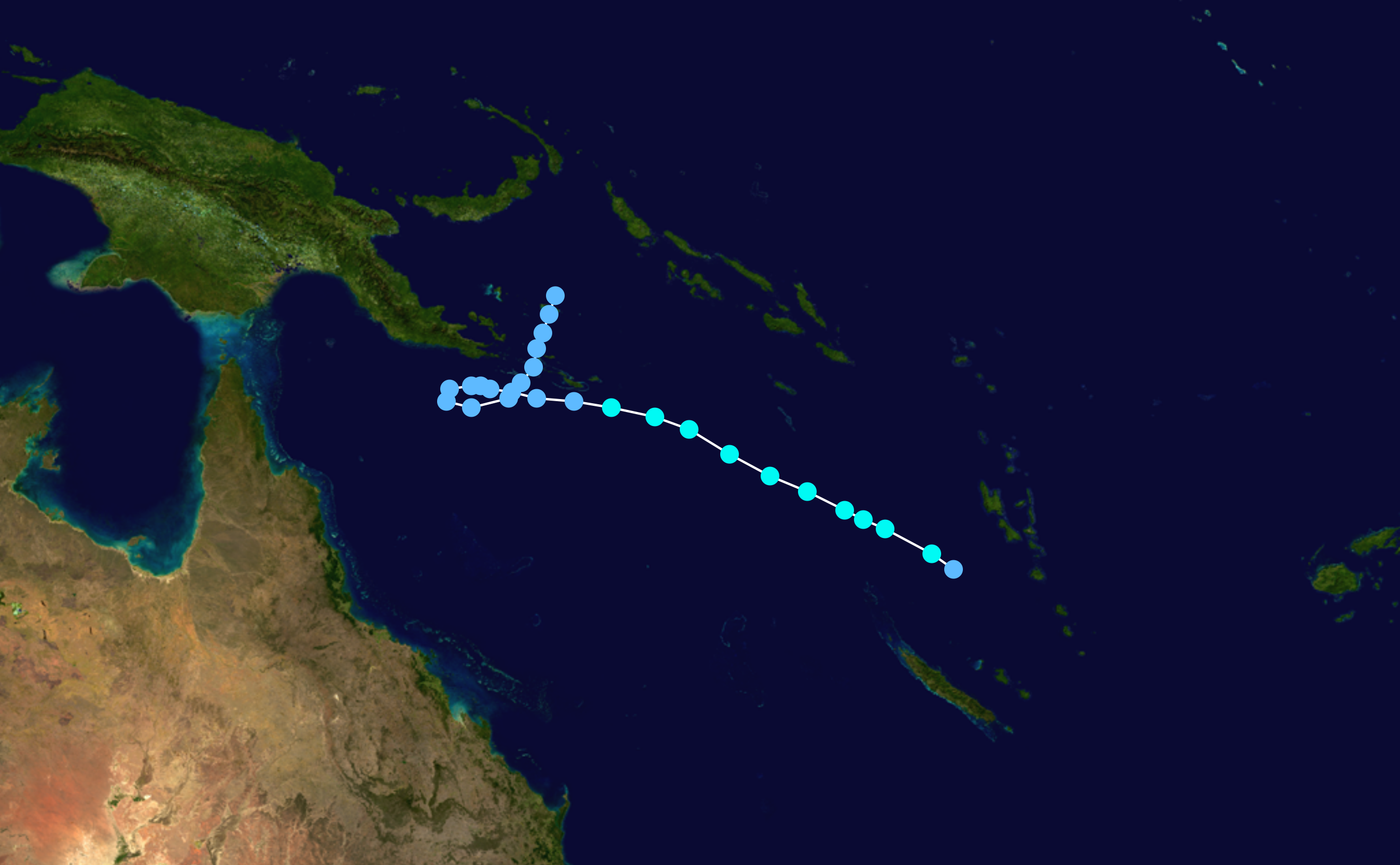
- Duration: April 25 – April 30 (Exited basin)
- Peak intensity: 85 km/h (50 mph) (1-min); 992 hPa (mbar)

The last named tropical cyclone of the season, Esther formed to the east of Port Moresby on April 25. The system then performed a loop before exiting the basin on April 30. Formed east of Papua New Guinea, executed a loop, and moved eastward into the South Pacific basin.

=== Other systems ===
A tropical depression formed on December 16 and later moved into the neighboring South-West Indian Ocean, becoming Cyclone Amber.

Tropical Cyclone Enid formed on the extreme western portion of the basin on an unknown date; it later moved on the South-West Indian Ocean basin and was renamed Fanny.

There were two storms in April that exited off the northeast coast of Australia. The first one developed on April 8 to the southwest of Honiara, Solomon Islands. It moved to the northwest, then turned to the southwest, before it was last noted on April 15, midway between Queensland and New Caledonia. The second one formed on April 11 near the island nation and was last seen to the south-southwest of Brisbane on April 16.

== Season effects ==
1968–69 Australian region cyclone season
Name	Dates	Peak intensity			Areas affected	Damage (US$)	Deaths
Name	Dates	Category	Wind speed (km/h (mph))	Pressure (hPa)	Areas affected	Damage (US$)	Deaths
Adele	22–29 Nov	Category 1 tropical cyclone	65 (40)	998	None	None	0
Amber	16–22 Dec	Category 3 severe tropical cyclone	130 (80)	977	None	None	0
Beatie	19–24 Dec	Category 1 tropical cyclone	65 (40)	1001	Christmas Island	None	0
Bettina	26–27 Dec	Category 1 tropical cyclone	75 (45)	Not specified	None	None	0
Cheri	27–30 Dec	Category 1 tropical cyclone	85 (50)	995	None	None	0
Bridget	24–26 Jan	Category 1 tropical cyclone	65 (40)	1002	Queensland	None	0
Colleen	27 Jan – 5 Feb	Category 2 tropical cyclone	100 (65)	984	Solomon Islands, New Caledonia, New Zealand	Unknown	Unknown
Enid	5–6 Feb	Category 1 tropical cyclone	65 (40)	984	None	None	0
Gladys	15–20 Feb	Category 2 tropical cyclone	95 (60)	987	Western Australia	Unknown	Unknown
Irene	21–24 Feb	Category 1 tropical cyclone	75 (45)	990	None	None	0
Audrey-Bonnie	1–9 Mar	Category 2 tropical cyclone	110 (70)	975	Western Australia, Northern Territory	Unknown	Unknown
Leonie	5–6 Apr	Category 1 tropical cyclone	75 (45)	995	Western Australia	Unknown	Unknown
Unspecified	8–15 Apr	Tropical low	45 (30)	Unspecified	None	None	0
Unspecified	11–16 Apr	Tropical low	45 (30)	Unspecified	None	None	0
Esther	25–30 Apr	Category 1 tropical cyclone	65 (40)	996	Solomon Islands, Papua New Guinea	None	0
Season aggregates
15 systems	22 Nov – 30 Apr		130 (80)	975		Unknown	Unknown

== See also ==
- Australian region tropical cyclone
- List of Southern Hemisphere tropical cyclone seasons
- Atlantic hurricane seasons: 1968, 1969
- Eastern Pacific hurricane seasons: 1968, 1969
- Western Pacific typhoon seasons: 1968, 1969
- North Indian Ocean cyclone seasons: 1968, 1969
- 1968–69 South-West Indian Ocean cyclone season
- 1968–69 South Pacific cyclone season
