= List of storms named Iva =

The name Iva was used for seven tropical cyclones in the East Pacific Ocean:

- Hurricane Iva (1961) – a Category 1 hurricane that made landfall in Mexico
- Tropical Storm Iva (1968) - a tropical storm that stayed out to sea
- Tropical Storm Iva (1972) - a tropical storm that stayed out to sea
- Hurricane Iva (1976) – a Category 4 hurricane that stayed out to sea
- Hurricane Iva (1978) – a Category 1 hurricane that stayed out to sea
- Tropical Storm Iva (1982) - a tropical storm that stayed out to sea
- Hurricane Iva (1988) – a Category 2 hurricane that affected Socorro Island

The name Iva was retired after the 1988 season and replaced with Ileana.

== See also ==
Storms with similar names

- Tropical Storm Iba (2019) – a South Atlantic Ocean tropical cyclone.
- Hurricane Iwa (1982) – a Central Pacific hurricane that became the costliest to affect Hawaii at the time.
