= List of A4 roads =

This is a list of roads designated A4.

A4 is the name of several roads:

- A004 road (Argentina), a road connecting Buenos Aires-La Plata highway with the Juan María Gutiérrez circle
- A4 motorway (Austria), a road connecting Vienna and Nickelsdorf on the Hungarian border
- A4 highway (Australia) may refer to:
  - A4/M4 (Sydney), a road linking the Blue Mountains and Sydney
  - Capricorn Highway, a road connecting Rockhampton with the Landsborough Highway at Barcaldine
  - Esk Highway, a road connecting the Midland Highway with the Tasman Highway
- A4 motorway (Belgium), a road connecting Brussel and the A6 in Luxembourg
- A4 motorway (Bulgaria), a road connecting A1 at Chirpan and the border crossing to Turkey, at the village of Kapitan Andreevo
- A4 road (China) may refer to:
  - A4 road (Shanghai), a road in Shanghai connecting Xinzhuang Interchange and Fengjing Interchange
- A4 motorway (Croatia), a road connecting Zagreb to Hungary
- A4 motorway (Cuba), connecting Havana to Pinar del Río
- A4 autoroute (France), a road connecting Paris to Strasbourg
- A4 motorway (Germany), a road connecting Aachen and Görlitz
- A4 motorway (Italy), a road connecting Torino to Trieste
- A4 road (Jamaica), a road connecting Kingston and the A3 junction west of Annotto Bay
- A4 road (Kenya), a road from Gilgil to the Ethiopian border
- A4 road (Latvia), a beltway around Riga
- A4 highway (Lithuania), a road connecting Vilnius and Gardinas
- A4 motorway (Luxembourg), a road connecting Luxembourg City to Esch-sur-Alzette
- A4 road (Malaysia), a road in Sabah
- A4 motorway (Netherlands), a road connecting Amsterdam, The Hague, Rotterdam with the Belgian border near Antwerp's Harbour
- A4 highway (Nigeria), a road connecting Calabar and Maiduguri
- A4 autostrada (Poland), a motorway running through southern Poland from Zgorzelec (Polish-German border) to Korczowa (Polish-Ukrainian border)
- A4 motorway (Portugal), a highway connecting Amarante and Porto
- A4 motorway (Romania), a road serving as bypass for the Black Sea port town of Constanta
- A4 motorway (Serbia), a road connecting Niš and Dimitrovgrad at the Bulgarian border
- A4 motorway (Slovenia), a road connecting Maribor and Gruškovje at the Croatian border
- A4 road (Spain) may refer to:
  - A-4 motorway (Spain), a road connecting Madrid to the Andalusia region
  - Autovía EX-A4, a road in Extremadura connecting Cáceres and Badajoz
- A 4 road (Sri Lanka), a road connecting Colombo and Batticaloa via Ratnapura
- A4 motorway (Switzerland), a road connecting Schaffhausen to central Switzerland
- A4 motorway (Tunisia), a road connecting Tunis and Bizerte
- A4 road (United Kingdom) may refer to:
  - A4 road (England), a road connecting London to Avonmouth, Bristol
  - A4 road (Isle of Man), a primary road which connects Peel with Kirk Michael
  - A4 road (Northern Ireland), a road in Northern Ireland
- Interstate A-4, a road in Alaska
- A4 road (Zimbabwe), a highway between Beitbridge and Harare

== See also ==
- List of highways numbered 4
