= AIV =

AIV may refer to:

- Aimco, NYSE symbol AIV, an American operator of apartment communities
- AIV fodder, a kind of acidified silage
- Bavarian A IV, an 1852 German steam locomotive model
- George Downer Airport (IATA: AIV) serving Aliceville, Alabama, US
- Panoz AIV Roadster, an American automobile
- Angiotensin IV (angiotensin 4)
