= A4 (classification) =

Amputee sports classification

A4 is an amputee sport classification used by the International Sports Organization for the Disabled (ISOD).for people with acquired or congenital amputations. People in this class have one leg amputated below the knee. Their amputations impact their sport performance, including having balance issues, increased energy costs, higher rates of oxygen consumption, and issues with their gait. Sports people in this class are eligible to participate in include athletics, swimming, sitting volleyball, archery, weightlifting, wheelchair basketball, amputee basketball, amputee football, lawn bowls, and sitzball.

== Definition ==
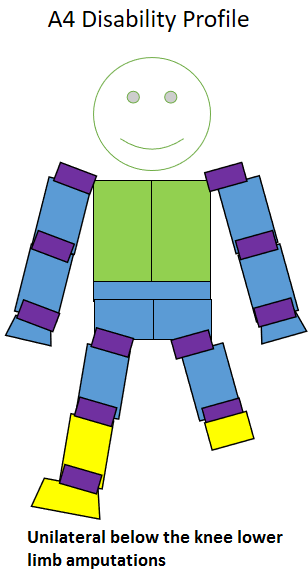
Type of amputation for an A4 classified sportsperson.

This class is for people who have one leg amputated below the knee. This classification is sometimes abbreviated as B/K. In competing in other sports, this class may have a different name:

Class	Abbr	Athletics	Cycling	Skiing	Swimming	Comparable classifications in other sports	Ref
A4	B/K	T44, F44, T54	LC2, LC3	LW 4	S10	Amputee basketball: Open. Amputee football: Field player. Lawn bowls: LB2. Sitting volleyball: Open. Sitzball: Open. Ten-pin bowling: TPB8, TPB9. Wheelchair basketball: 4 point player, 4.5 point player.	

== Performance and physiology ==
The nature of a person's amputations in this class can effect their physiology and sports performance. Because of the potential for balance issues related to having an amputation, during weight training, amputees are encouraged to use a spotter when lifting more than 15 pounds (6.8 kg). Lower limb amputations effect a person's energy cost for being mobile. To keep their oxygen consumption rate similar to people without lower limb amputations, they need to walk slower. People in this class use around 7% more oxygen to walk or run the same distance as someone without a lower limb amputation.

People in this class can have a number of problems with their gait. There are a number of different causes for these issues, and suggested ways to modify them. For a gait that has abrupt heel contact, the cause can be excessive heel lever. This can be fixed by realigning their prosthetic foot. For jerky knee motions, the cause could be a loose socket in the knee or inadequate suspension. In that case, the socket might need replacing or they may need to realign the prosthesis. If they have prolonged heel contact, the cause could be problems with the heel lever in their prosthesis or a worn out heel. These are fixed by increasing heel stiffness or realigning the prosthesis. In some cases, prolong heel contact or knees remaining fulling extended is a problem with training in how to use the prosthesis. Another issue might be foot drag. This can be caused by an ill fitting prosthesis that can be fixed by shortening the length of the prosthesis. Some people in this class could have uneven length strides. This can be a result of problems with hip flexion or insecurity about their walk. Both are fixed by physical therapy.

== Governance ==
This classification was set up by ISOD, with the current version adopted in 1992 and then modified in 1993. IWAS was created following the merger of ISOD and International Stoke Mandeville Games Federation (ISMGF) in 2005. Subsequently, IWAS became the classification governing body for some amputee sports.

== Sports ==
=== Athletics ===
For athletics competitions that use the IPC athletics classification system, this class competes in T44 and F44. In modern pentathlon, they compete in P44. Shank length for people in this class is not uniform, with competitors having different lengths of leg found below their knee. People in this class use a prosthetic limb when competing in athletics. It has three parts: a socket, a shank and a foot. People in this class can use standard starting blocks because their amputation generally allows for the use of a standard starting position. Use of a specially made carbon fibre running prosthetic leg assists runners in this class in lowering their heart rate compared to using a prosthetic not designed for running. Runners in this class can have lower metabolic costs compared to elite runners over middle and long distances.

Inside the class, shank length does not impact the distance that male long jumpers can jump. A study of was done comparing the performance of athletics competitors at the 1984 Summer Paralympics. It found there was no significant difference in performance in times between women in A3 and A4 in the javelin, women in A2, A3 and A4 in the long jump, men in the A3, A4, A5, A6, A7, A8 and A9 in the discus, men in A2, A3 and A4 in the discus, men in A1, A2, A3, A4, A5, A6, A7, A8 and A9 in the javelin, men in A2, A3 and A4 in the javelin, men in A2, A3 and A4 in the shot put, men in A2, A3 and A4 in the high jump, men in A4, A5 and A6 in the high jump, and men in A1, A2, A3 and A4 in the 400 meter race.

Historically, because of low participation rates in men's T43 races, the class has been combined with the T44 class. The combined class was then called T44 and included both single and double below the knee amputees. There was a push in 2008 to avoid this happening because of a perception that double below knee amputees had a competitive advantage compared to single below knee amputees. Subsequent research related to results for men at the 2012 Summer Paralympics in London confirmed this to be the case for both the 200 meters and 400 meters.

=== Basketball ===
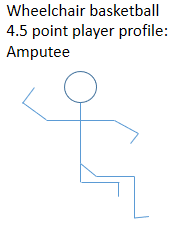
Profile of a wheelchair basketball player amputation type

In wheelchair basketball, sportspeople in this class tend to be classified a 4 point players or 4.5 point players. The cut off point between the two classes is generally based on the location of the amputations. People with amputations longer than 2/3rds the length of their thigh are generally 4.5 point players. Those with shorter amputations are 4 point players. In wheelchair basketball, A4 players can have issues with controlling their sideways movements. Despite wheelchair basketball having been around since the first Paralympic Games, amputee players from this class were first allowed to be classified and participate internationally in 1983 following the creation of a functional classification system in Cologne, Germany by Horst Strokhkendl. Players from this class first competed at the 1983 Gold Cup Championships.

There is a basketball variant called amputee basketball. It uses the ISOD classification system as to whom is eligible to participate, but it is open in terms of all eligible classes, including this one, can play. There is no point system for who is allowed on the floor at any given time like there is in wheelchair basketball.

=== Cycling ===
People in this class tend to be classified in cycling events as LC2 or LC3. LC2 is for cyclists with an impairment in one leg but who can pedal normally. LC3 is for cyclists with an impairment in one leg, and who cannot pedal normally. They generally can only pedal with one leg.

=== Football ===
One of the sports available to people in this class is amputee football. There are two variants of the game, one with 4 players a side and one with 7 players a side. In both variants, A2 and A4 players must be field players while A6 and A8 players must be goalkeepers. In the 4 person variant, there are two halves of 15 minutes each. In the 7 person variant, there are two halves of 25 minutes each. Players in this class cannot use their residual stumps to kick the ball as it would give them an unfair advantage.

=== Skiing ===
This class was one of the first to be involved in alpine skiing. Early in the sports history, skiers in this class did not use prosthetic legs. People in this class are currently classified as LW4.

=== Swimming ===
People with amputations are eligible to compete in swimming at the Paralympic Games. A4 swimmers may be found in several classes. These include S10. Prior to the 1990s, this class was often grouped with other amputee classes in swimming competitions, including the Paralympic Games. Because they have only a single leg, they have less area on a swimming starting block. The balance issues associated with this can make it more challenging to use a traditional starting position to enter the water. Swimmers in this class have a similar stroke length and stroke rate to able bodied swimmers.

A study comparing the performance of swimming competitors at the 1984 Summer Paralympics found there was no significant difference in performance in times between women in A4, A5 and A6 the 100 meter 100 meter freestyle, men in A4 and A5 in the 100 meter freestyle, men and women in A2, A3 and A4 in the 25 meter butterfly, women in A4, A5 and A6 in the 4 x 50 meter individual medley, and men and women in A4, A5 and A6 in the 100 meter backstroke.

=== Other sports ===
Other sports people in this class are eligible to compete in include sitting volleyball, archery, and weightlifting In both archery and sitting volleyball, different classes of amputees have historically competed against each other as one class for people with amputations or people who have a minimal disability level. In the case of weightlifting, amputees have also traditionally been grouped together, with divisions being based on weight instead. Another sport open to people in this class is lawn bowls. A4 competitors can be classified as LB2. This is a standing class. Ten pin bowling is also open to people in this class. They compete in the TPB8 class and TPB9 class. Sitzball, the precursor to sitting volleyball, is another option. It is open to A1 to A9 classified players along with anyone who might be classified as "les autres" or who have lesser amputations that would not qualify them for ISOD classification. It is not open to people with spinal cord injuries. Play is open, with no requirements as to which types of disabilities are on the court at any time. Rowing is another sport open to people with amputations. In 1991, the first internationally accepted adaptive rowing classification system was established and put into use. People from this class were initially classified as A1 for people with single limb amputations.

== Becoming classified ==
Classification is often based on the anatomical nature of the amputation. The classification system takes several things into account when putting people into this class. These include which limbs are effected, how many limbs are effected, and how much of a limb is missing.

For this class, classification generally has four phase. The first stage of classification is a health examination. For amputees, this is often done on site at a sports training facility or competition. The second stage is observation in practice, the third stage is observation in competition and the last stage is assigning the sportsperson to a relevant class. Sometimes the health examination may not be done on site because the nature of the amputation could cause not physically visible alterations to the body. This is especially true for lower limb amputees as it relates to how their limbs align with their hips and the impact this has on their spine and how their skull sits on their spine.

During the observation phase involving training or practice for track and field, athletes in this class may be asked to demonstrate their skills in athletics, such as running, jumping or throwing. A determination is then made as to what classification an athlete should compete in. Classifications may be Confirmed or Review status. For athletes who do not have access to a full classification panel, Provisional classification is available; this is a temporary Review classification, considered an indication of class only, and generally used only in lower levels of competition.

For wheelchair basketball, part of the classification process involves observing a player during practice or training. This often includes observing them go one on one against someone who is likely to be in the same class the player would be classified into.
