= Iva, Iran =

Iva (Persian: ايوا) may refer to:

- Iva, Heris, East Azerbaijan Province
- Iva, Sarab, East Azerbaijan Province
- Iva, Mazandaran
