= Ararat International Airlines =

Armenia-based airline

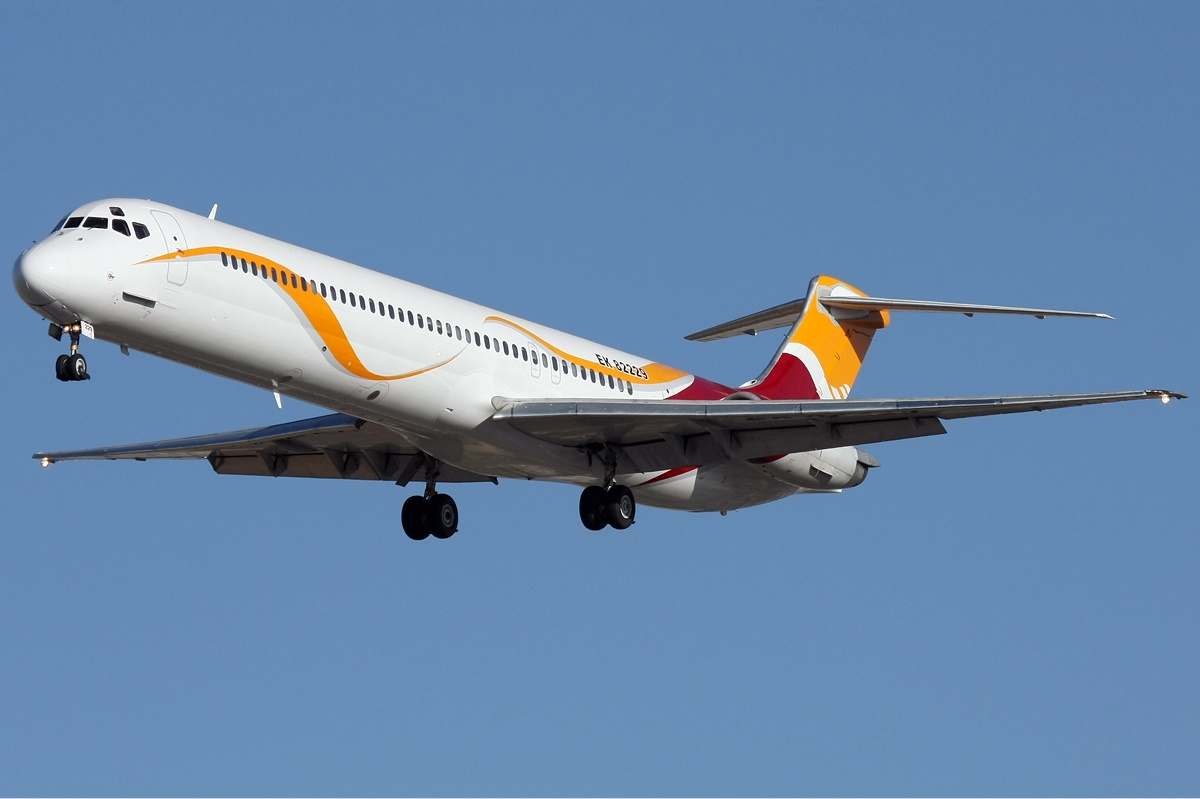
- McDonnell-Douglas MD.82
IATA	ICAO	Call sign
4A	RRN	ARARAT AVIA
- Founded: 2010
- Ceased operations: 2013
- Operating bases: Zvartnots International Airport
- Fleet size: 1
- Headquarters: Yerevan, Armenia
- Website: '

Ararat International Airlines was an airline headquartered in Yerevan, Armenia and based at the city's Zvartnots International Airport. The company (the name of which is derived from Mount Ararat) was founded in 2010. All operations were stopped in 2013.

== Fleet ==
In January 2013 the Ararat International Airlines fleet, consisting of just one McDonnell Douglas MD-82, was leased out to Kish Air from Iran.
