= Hurricane Francelia =

Category 2 Atlantic hurricane in 1969

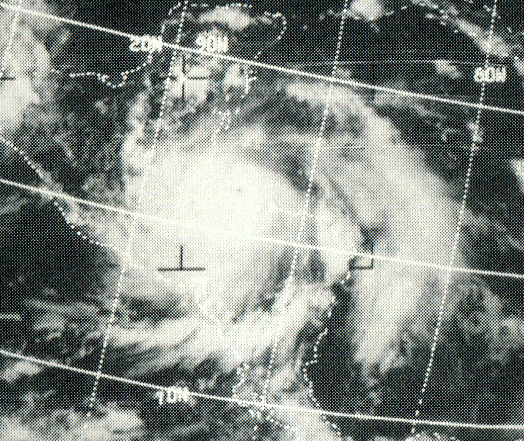
- Francelia at peak intensity on September 2

Meteorological history
- Formed: August 29, 1969
- Dissipated: September 4, 1969

Category 2 hurricane
- 1-minute sustained (SSHWS/NWS)
- Highest winds: 100 mph (155 km/h)
- Lowest pressure: 973 mbar (hPa); 28.73 inHg

Overall effects
- Fatalities: 271
- Damage: $35.6 million (1969 USD)
- Areas affected: Leeward Islands, Honduras, Guatemala, Belize
- IBTrACS
- Part of the 1969 Atlantic hurricane season

Hurricane Francelia was the deadliest hurricane of the 1969 Atlantic hurricane season after causing significant flooding to Central America, especially Belize and Guatemala. The sixth named storm and fourth hurricane of the season, Francelia developed from a tropical wave in the southeastern Caribbean Sea on August 29. It moved west-northwestward and strengthened into a tropical storm on the following day. On September 1, Francelia reached hurricane status, shortly before re-curving west-southwest. While approaching Central America, the storm intensified and peaked as a 100 mph (160 km/h) Category 2 hurricane on September 2. Francelia weakened slightly before making landfall near Punta Gorda, Belize (then British Honduras) (Note: British Honduras, formerly a British Overseas Territory, attained its independence in 1981 and became the country of Belize. The territory is referred to as Belize in the article.) late on September 3. The storm quickly weakened inland and dissipated by the following day.

During its early stages, Francelia brought gusty winds and light rainfall to several islands in the Caribbean Sea. While remaining nearly stationary offshore Central America, heavy precipitation fell in some countries, especially Guatemala where severe flooding killed 269 people and caused $15 million in damage. (Note: All damage totals are in 1969 United States dollars.) In neighboring Honduras, the hurricane struck after the undeclared Football War, causing additional damage in the northern portions of the country. Damage in Honduras was heaviest on the offshore Bay Islands, and the hurricane damaged or destroyed the majority of two towns there. In El Salvador, flooding isolated towns for several days and caused crop damage. Several rivers in the region flooded, with the Belize River reaching 36 feet (11 m) above normal. Coastal areas of Belize lost electricity and telephone service, and high winds resulted in extensive damage to banana crops. Francelia ranked as the deadliest tropical cyclone in Guatemala, until Hurricane Mitch in 1998. Overall damage was estimated at $35.6 million, and there were 271 deaths.

== Meteorological history ==
Map plotting the storm's track and intensity, according to the Saffir–Simpson scale Map key Saffir–Simpson scale Tropical depression (≤38 mph, ≤62 km/h) Tropical storm (39–73 mph, 63–118 km/h) Category 1 (74–95 mph, 119–153 km/h) Category 2 (96–110 mph, 154–177 km/h) Category 3 (111–129 mph, 178–208 km/h) Category 4 (130–156 mph, 209–251 km/h) Category 5 (≥157 mph, ≥252 km/h) Unknown Storm type Tropical cyclone Subtropical cyclone Extratropical cyclone, remnant low, tropical disturbance, or monsoon depression

The origins of Hurricane Francelia were from a tropical wave – an elongated low pressure area – that exited the western coast of Africa on August 19. It moved westward across the tropical Atlantic Ocean, and the annual summary of 1969 tropical cyclone activity indicated there may have been a tropical depression – a cyclone with sustained winds of less 40 mph (64 km/h) – briefly located within the system. On August 26, an area of convection, or thunderstorms, developed along the wave, about 800 miles (1,300 km) east of Barbados. A Hurricane Hunters flight two days later reported no low-level circulation. As the system moved through the southern Lesser Antilles, ship and land observations suggested a circulation had developed, signalling the formation of a tropical depression in the extreme southeastern Caribbean Sea early on August 29.

The new tropical cyclone moved quickly west-northwestward away from South America, and on August 30 reconnaissance aircraft recorded winds of 45 mph (72 km/h). Based on the observation, the depression was upgraded to tropical storm status and given the name Francelia. Strengthening continued to near hurricane-force, but the fast-moving circulation outran the convection, causing brief weakening as it passed south of Jamaica. Although initially forecast to continue to the west-northwest, Francelia slowed and turned to the west-southwest on September 1 due to a ridge to its north. Concurrently, the storm intensified into hurricane status after its winds reached 75 mph (121 km/h), and late on September 1 Francelia passed over Swan Island. During its passage, an atmospheric sounding occurred in its eye; a sounding is a measurement of the physical properties of the atmosphere, and the process had only occurred four times previously.

Hurricane Francelia continued west-southwestward toward the northern coast of Central America, strengthening significantly despite its proximity to land. A Hurricane Hunters flight on September 2 reported winds of 115 mph (185 km/h) and a minimum pressure of 973 mbar (28.7 inHg) as the hurricane crossed over the Bay Islands, only 30 miles (48 km) off the coast of Honduras. Francelia weakened slightly as its forward movement slowed, but it remained a hurricane as it approached land, based on confirmation from ship reports. Late on September 3, the hurricane made landfall with winds estimated at 110 mph (180 km/h), just north of Punta Gorda in southern Belize, then known as British Honduras. Tropical storm force winds spread across the country, although hurricane-force winds occurred only in a small area near where the hurricane made landfall. Francelia weakened quickly over land, dissipating late on September 4 over Guatemala. The system continued slowly across Central America, crossing into the eastern Pacific Ocean three days after it moved ashore. On September 8, the remnants of Francelia redeveloped into Tropical Storm Glenda off the coast of Mexico, which moved parallel to the southwest Mexican coast before dissipating on September 12.

== Impact ==
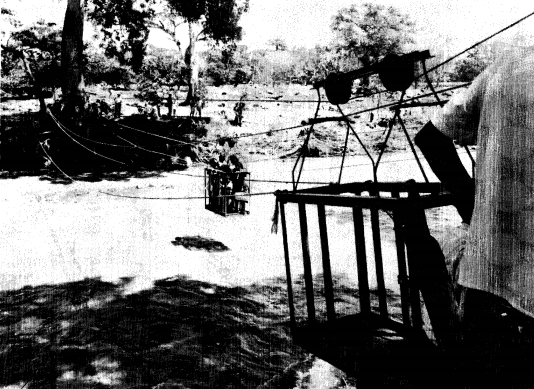
Image of a washed out bridge along the Achiguate River

As a developing tropical cyclone, Francelia brought gusty winds to several islands across the eastern Caribbean. A few days later, it passed south of Jamaica, and winds of around 30 mph (48 km/h) were recorded, and there was heavy rainfall. Shortly thereafter, the eye of Francelia crossed over Grand Cayman, producing 0.56 in (14 mm) in a 16‑hour period. On Swan Island, located about 90 miles (140 km) offshore Honduras, Francelia produced peak winds of 60 mph (97 km/h). A station on the island recorded a minimum pressure of 994 mbar (29.4 inHg), as well as 3.57 in (91 mm) of rainfall during the storm's passage.

Before Francelia made its final landfall, the National Hurricane Center (NHC) issued warnings for countries in the western Caribbean, although there were few observations confirming the track while it was active due to inadequate regional weather stations and lack of the Hurricane Hunters close to land. When Francelia nearly stalled off the coast of Central America, it brought prolonged rainfall and extensive flooding. In Guatemala, daily rainfall reached 7.27 in (185 mm) at a station along the Achiguate River, and totals reached about 20 in (510 mm) in some mountainous areas. Along the Belizean coast, the hurricane produced a storm tide of about 10 ft (3.0 m). Mountain rainfall resulted in overflown rivers, with the Belize River rising to over 36 feet (11 m) above normal. The hurricane forced over 20,000 people to evacuate their homes.

Offshore northern Honduras, the Bay Islands experienced heavy rainfall and high tides from the hurricane. Most of the houses in French Harbor were damaged or destroyed, leaving 400 families homeless. About half of the town of Coxen Hole on Roatán was destroyed, and the rest of the buildings were damaged. Damage was less severe on Útila and Guanaja islands. Francelia flooded most of the northern coast of Honduras, inundating the airport in San Pedro Sula to a depth of 10 ft (3.0 m). In San Pedro Sula, the storm cut the water supply for several days, and the floods cut road and rail links between there and Puerto Cortés along the coast. Across the region, Francelia caused widespread power outages. Along the Ulúa River, several residents were stranded when their cars stalled in flooded roadways. The floods wrecked four bridges on a road between La Lima and Tela. Flooding also ruined over 50% of the United Fruit Company's banana crop, forcing over 15,000 acres (6,100 ha) to be replaced. Banana damage totaled $4.7 million, and United Fruit estimated it would take two years to reach production levels before the hurricane. Other damaged crops included corn, sugar, coconut, and bean. Nationwide, the hurricane destroyed about 1,000 houses, leaving 5,000 people homeless. Damage was estimated at $19 million.

In neighboring Guatemala, Francelia caused flash flooding along the Pacific coast due to the heavy rainfall. The rains overflowed rivers, canals, and the crater lake of Volcán de Agua, causing widespread landslides. The floods and landslides wrecked highways, rail lines, and many boats, leaving several towns isolated. A 135 ft (41 m) portion of the Pan-American Highway was washed out in the country's western portion, and another bridge was destroyed by a landslide between Quetzaltenango and Huehuetenango; landslides also forced the closure of two roads in Quiché Department. In Amatitlán, the floods covered the entire town with mud to shoulder-height. Five entire towns were largely destroyed, leaving 10,200 people homeless nationwide. Francelia destroyed 1,704 houses, mostly along rivers and in landslide zones. The floods also damaged power lines and crops. Throughout the country, the hurricane killed 269 people and caused $15 million in damage.

Francelia's rainfall extended into El Salvador, where about 1,000 homes were flooded along the Lempa River. Isolated residents along the Paz River required food to be airdropped. The floods damaged corn and sorghum crops, and some livestock were killed. Francelia destroyed 42 houses in El Salvador, destroyed a bridge, and caused $1.6 million in damage. The hurricane killed two people and injured 40 others. Heavy damage also occurred along the Belize coast, and communications were cut. The storm caused extensive damage to crops, including heavy losses to the banana industry. High waves and heavy rainfall caused power outages and flooded coastal roadways.

== Aftermath ==
By September 5, or two days after the hurricane's landfall, floods were receding across Honduras, and flights were restored to the Bay Islands. Floods receded a day later in Guatemala and not until September 9 in El Salvador.

Shortly after Francelia struck the Bay Islands, the Honduran health ministry flew a doctor and nurse with medical supplies to the islands. Undamaged boats were used to transport people and supplies to the islands, utilizing relief goods intended for the recovery after a war earlier in 1969. In Guatemala, the president organized the National Emergency Committee to coordinate disaster relief, but after few organizations complied, there was duplicate relief work in some areas and no assistance in other areas. The Guatemalan Red Cross and the country's air force and army helped in the relief efforts. Citizens throughout the country donated over $200,000 worth of food and clothing. The government made widespread road and bridge repairs following the floods with the assistance of the United States, installing two Bailey bridges that were completed by early November; there were delays installing the bridges due to persistent unsettled weather. The United States ultimately provided $281,659 in aid to the country, mostly through the road reconstruction and C-rations. Other countries and Red Cross chapters sent money to Guatemala, including 10 tons of medicine from Brazil, 500 blankets from Chile, and 200 bottles of snake bite serum from Costa Rica. El Salvador also received assistance from the United States, including food and blankets.

== See also ==
- List of Category 2 Atlantic hurricanes
- 1931 British Honduras hurricane – A destructive Category 4 hurricane that became the deadliest storm to ever strike Belize
- Hurricane Greta–Olivia (1978) – A deadly, crossover Category 4 hurricane that took similar path and caused catastrophic damage
