= 1969 Atlantic hurricane season =

- Season summary map

Seasonal boundaries
- First system formed: June 8, 1969
- Last system dissipated: November 25, 1969

Strongest storm
- Name: Camille
  - Maximum winds: 175 mph (280 km/h) (1-minute sustained)
  - Lowest pressure: 900 mbar (hPa; 26.58 inHg)

Seasonal statistics
- Total depressions: 23
- Total storms: 18
- Hurricanes: 12
- Major hurricanes (Cat. 3+): 3
- Total fatalities: 535 total
- Total damage: $1.495 billion (1969 USD)

Related articles
- 1969 Pacific hurricane season; 1969 Pacific typhoon season; 1969 North Indian Ocean cyclone season

The 1969 Atlantic hurricane season was the most active Atlantic hurricane season since the 1933 season, and was the last year in a positive Atlantic multidecadal oscillation (AMO) period, which would not occur again until 1995. The hurricane season officially began on June 1, and lasted until November 30. Altogether, 12 tropical cyclones reached hurricane strength, the highest number on record at the time; a mark not surpassed until 2005. The season was above-average despite an El Niño, which typically suppresses activity in the Atlantic Ocean, while increasing tropical cyclone activity in the Pacific Ocean. Activity began with a tropical depression that caused extensive flooding in Cuba and Jamaica in early June. On July 25, Tropical Storm Anna developed, the first named storm of the season. Later in the season, Tropical Depression Twenty-Nine caused severe local flooding in the Florida Panhandle and southwestern Georgia in September.

The most significant storm of the season was Hurricane Camille, which peaked as a Category 5 hurricane on August 17 and devastated the Gulf Coast of the United States upon striking Mississippi the next day. Strong winds and storm surge heights especially impacted Mississippi and Louisiana. Later in its duration, the storm caused severe flooding Virginia and West Virginia. Camille alone was responsible for 259 deaths and $1.43 billion. (Note: All monetary values are in 1969 United States dollars unless otherwise noted.) It was the costliest United States hurricane at the time, until Hurricane Agnes in 1972. In early September, Hurricane Francelia caused deadly floods in Central America, with 271 people killed in Central America. Hurricane Inga had the third longest duration of an Atlantic tropical cyclone. The last storm, Hurricane Martha, was the only known tropical cyclone to make landfall in Panama. Martha caused minor flooding in the former and Costa Rica. Overall, the systems of the season collectively caused 535 deaths and over $1.5 billion in losses.

== Season summary ==
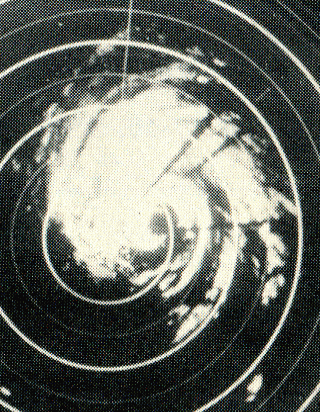
Radar image of Hurricane Camille on August 17

The 1969 Atlantic hurricane season officially began on June 1. Of the twenty-three tropical cyclones that developed in the North Atlantic Ocean in 1969, eighteen of them intensified into tropical storms; this was above the 1950–2000 average of 9.6 named storms. In terms of tropical storms, it was the busiest season since 1933. Twelve systems reached hurricane status, a record that stood until there were fifteen named storms in 2005. Three of the hurricanes deepened into major hurricanes, which are Category 3 or higher on the Saffir–Simpson hurricane wind scale. Between 1950 and 2000, there was an average of 2.3 major hurricanes per season. Throughout the season, the U.S. Weather Bureau issued more advisories than in any previous season. Additionally, reconnaissance aircraft were utilized for more flight hours than in any year in the Atlantic basin until that point. The season officially ended on November 30.

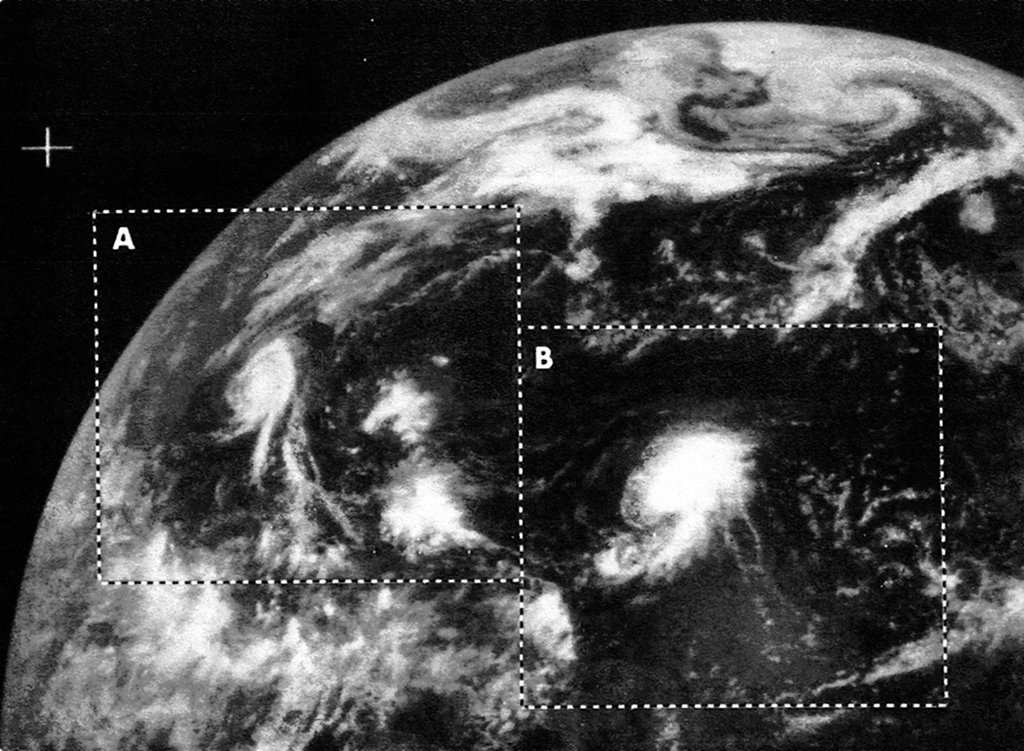
ATS-3 Satellite imagery on August 17, showing Hurricanes Camille and Debbie active simultaneously

Hurricane Camille made landfall in Mississippi on August 18 as a Category 5 hurricane, one of only four tropical cyclones on record to strike the continental United States at that strength, after the 1935 Labor Day hurricane, and addition to: Hurricane Andrew in 1992, and Hurricane Michael in 2018. During the 1969 season, Project Stormfury conducted seeding experiments on Hurricane Debbie, which declined in wind speed by 31% on the first day and by 18% of the following day. With a duration of almost 25 days from September 20 to October 15, Hurricane Inga became the third longest-lasting tropical cyclone on record in the Atlantic, behind only the 1899 San Ciriaco hurricane, and Hurricane Ginger in 1971. On November 24, Hurricane Martha became the first tropical cyclone on record to strike Panama.

The season was above average despite an El Niño, which typically suppresses tropical cyclogenesis in the Atlantic Ocean while increasing activity in the eastern Pacific Ocean. The Atlantic upper tropospheric shear line, a semi-permanent feature that extended southeastward into the Caribbean Sea, which enhances outflow from disturbances, remained persistent throughout the season. However, the opposite periphery of the shear line inhibits the divergent outflow of a disturbance. This may have increased the number of tropical cyclones developing, while causing other storms to remain weak or dissipate over the deep tropics. Additionally, an abnormally strong mid-tropospheric ridge replaced the southward-displaced westerlies that deterred tropical cyclone formation in 1968. Five hurricanes and two tropical storms made landfall, causing 535 deaths and $1.5 billion in damage; Tropical Depression Twenty-Nine also resulted in damage.

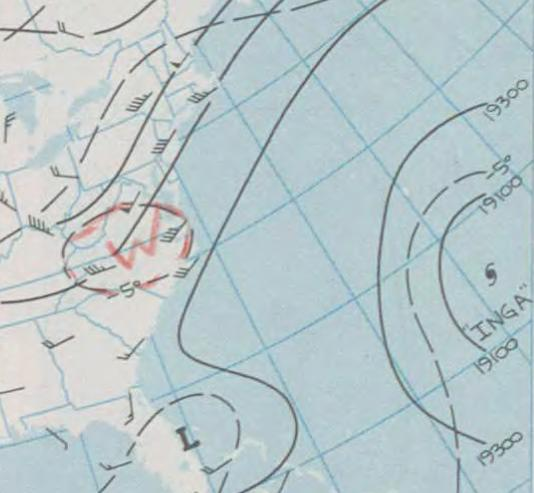
Weather map featuring Hurricane Inga on October 3

Tropical cyclogenesis began early, with a tropical depression that affected Jamaica. Activity briefly went dormant between June 15 and July 25, when the next depression originated. That same day, the season's first named storm, Anna, developed over the eastern Atlantic. There were five tropical cyclones that formed in the month of August – Blanche, Camille, Debbie, Eve, and Francelia. Camille was the most intense tropical cyclone of the season, peaking as a Category 5 hurricane with maximum sustained winds of 175 mph (282 km/h) and a minimum barometric pressure of 900 mbar (27 inHg).

September was the most active month of the season, with six tropical cyclones, five of which intensified into a tropical storm – Gerda, Holly, Inga, and an unnamed hurricane. Of the five named storms that originated in October, three intensified into hurricanes, including Kara, Laurie, and an unnamed storm. While an unnamed hurricane existed into November, Martha was the only tropical cyclone to originate in that month. Martha, the last storm of the season, dissipated over Panama on November 25.

The season's activity was reflected with an accumulated cyclone energy (ACE) rating of 149. ACE is, broadly speaking, a measure of the power of the hurricane multiplied by the length of time it existed, so storms that last a long time, as well as particularly strong hurricanes, have high ACEs. It is only calculated for full advisories on tropical systems at or exceeding 39 mph (63 km/h), which is the threshold for tropical storm status.

== Systems ==
=== June tropical depression ===
- Tropical depression (SSHWS)
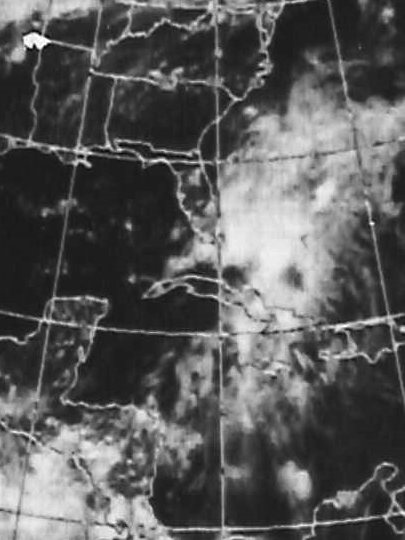
- Duration: June 8 – June 9
- Peak intensity: 30 mph (45 km/h) (1-min); 1006 mbar (hPa)

A tropical depression developed near the Yucatan Peninsula on June 7. It moved north, reaching western Cuba by the following day. As the depression moved towards Florida, small-craft warnings were issued for the southern coast. The depression made landfall in Florida on June 9 and dissipated shortly thereafter. As a result of 2 to 3 in (51 to 76 mm) rain in Cuba, Radio Havana warned of a flash flood and later reported that three rivers were overflowing in Camagüey. Flooding also forced 1,801 people from their homes. Sustained winds of 15 to 25 mph (24 to 40 km/h) and gusts up to 40 mph (64 km/h) were observed on the island. Impact from the depression in Florida is unknown.

Damage was catastrophic in Jamaica with landslides, flooding, broken communication lines, cancellation of its railway service and evacuation of hundreds of people from their homes. The Jamaica Railway Corporation's trains were disrupted by landslides blocking the tracks from Spanish Town to Port Antonio and floodwaters inundating a bridge in Gregory Park. A train bound for Kingston was disrupted by the flooded bridge, as was a diesel tram, isolating both trains at Richmond. Furthermore, the former train did not reach its destination due to landslides. The Jamaica Telephone Company reported troubles due to waterlogged telephone lines. Schools and colleges in Kingston suspended classes and motorists in the area had difficulty traveling due to flooded roads. Correspondents from The Gleaner reported heavy rains, which inundated roads, washed away livestock and destroyed crops. On June 9, the Church Welfare Organization of the West Indies Junior Seventh Day Adventists set out food, money and blankets the victims.

=== July tropical depression ===
- Tropical depression (SSHWS)
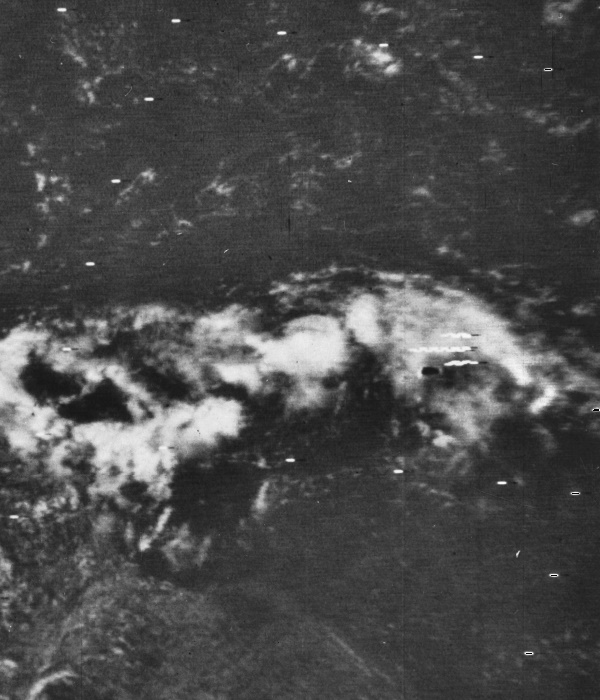
- Duration: July 25 – July 27
- Peak intensity: 30 mph (45 km/h) (1-min); ≤1011 mbar (hPa)

A tropical wave situated about 400 mi (640 km) east of Trinidad developed into a tropical depression on July 25. The depression moved northwestward toward the Lesser Antilles and later that day crossed Barbados with winds of 35 mph (56 km/h). It continued to the northwest and may have struck Martinique on July 26. At 0000 UTC on the following day, the depression dissipated about 30 mi (48 km) west-southwest of Basseterre, Guadeloupe.

=== Tropical Storm Anna ===
- Tropical storm (SSHWS)
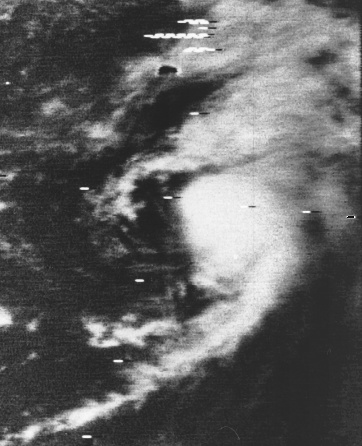
- Duration: July 25 – August 4
- Peak intensity: 70 mph (110 km/h) (1-min); 1001 mbar (hPa)

On July 23, a tropical wave emerged into the Atlantic from the west coast of Africa. By 06:00 UTC on July 25, the system developed into Tropical Depression Twelve. Initially, the depression strengthened slowly while moving west-northwestward. Eventually, it was upgraded to Tropical Storm Anna at 06:00 UTC on July 27. Modest intensification ensued during the next 18 hours, after which Anna maintained winds of 60 mph (97 km/h) for nearly two days. At 12:00 UTC on July 30, Anna began to weaken and moved in a more northwesterly direction. By 12:00 UTC on July 31, Anna degenerated into a surface-based trough while situated north of the Lesser Antilles, but continued to produce gale-force winds.

Anna reorganized into a tropical storm by 12:00 UTC on August 1, but weakened to a tropical depression as it re-curved northeastward on August 2, while situated offshore of the East Coast of the United States. By 18:00 UTC, however, Anna once again regained tropical-storm status, and underwent steady intensification on the following day. At 18:00 UTC on August 3, Anna peaked with winds of 70 mph (110 km/h), and six hours later attained its minimum central pressure of 1,001 mb (29.6 inHg). Anna subsequently weakened and merged with an extratropical low-pressure area on the same day, while centered near Sable Island. The remnants continued rapidly east-northeastward across the Atlantic until becoming unidentifiable on August 5.

=== August tropical depression ===
- Tropical depression (SSHWS)
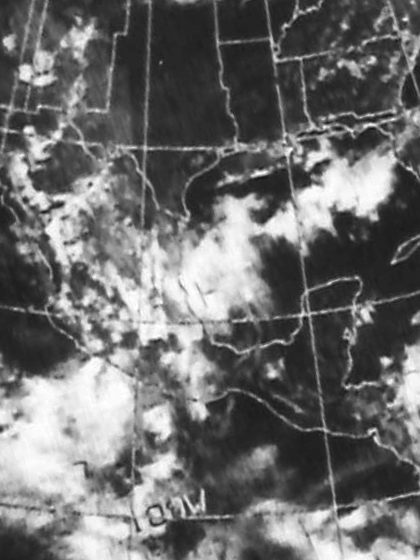
- Duration: August 7 – August 8
- Peak intensity: 35 mph (55 km/h) (1-min); 1010 mbar (hPa)

A trough in the western Gulf of Mexico produced an area of thunderstorms. On August 7, a Hurricane Hunters flight observed a circulation, indicating that a tropical depression developed. The system moved southwestward, making landfall near Tuxpan in northeastern Mexico early on August 8. It quickly dissipated after moving ashore.

=== Hurricane Blanche ===
- Category 1 hurricane (SSHWS)
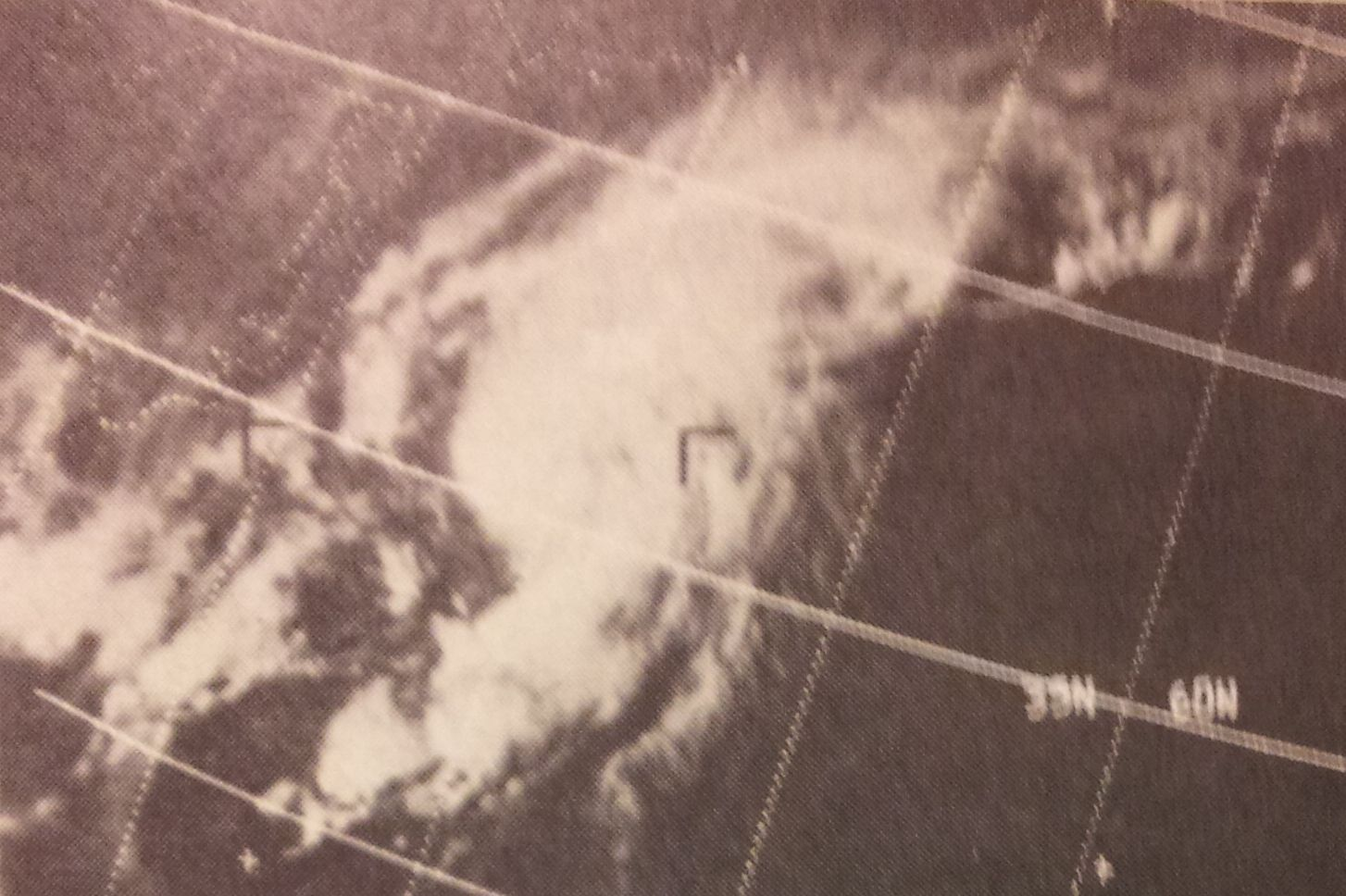
- Duration: August 11 – August 13
- Peak intensity: 85 mph (140 km/h) (1-min); 997 mbar (hPa)

A tropical wave was initially tracked about 1,300 mi (2,100 km) east of the Lesser Antilles on August 6. The system curved west-northward on August 6 and eventually moved around the western periphery of the Bermuda high. Late on August 10, a closed circulation developed, indicative of a tropical depression, and by 00:00 UTC on August 11 the system became a tropical storm while located about 530 mi (850 km) east of Wabasso Beach, Florida. Under the influence of a trough, Blanche headed rapidly north to north-northeastward while significantly intensifying, becoming a hurricane by 18:00 UTC on the same date, based on Navy reconnaissance reports.

At 00:00 UTC on August 12, Blanche peaked at 85 mph (137 km/h). Afterward, the strong southwesterly current in which Blanche was embedded caused the storm to accelerate northeastward. By 12:00 UTC Blanche lost its tropical characteristics near Sable Island, having developed an asymmetrical wind field. At Sable Island, a weather station reported sustained winds of 51 mph (82 km/h) and gusts up to 69 mph (111 km/h). While passing to the south of Newfoundland, the extratropical remnants of Blanche turned eastward and east-southeastward, eventually to be absorbed by a frontal zone late on August 14.

=== Hurricane Debbie ===
- Category 3 hurricane (SSHWS)
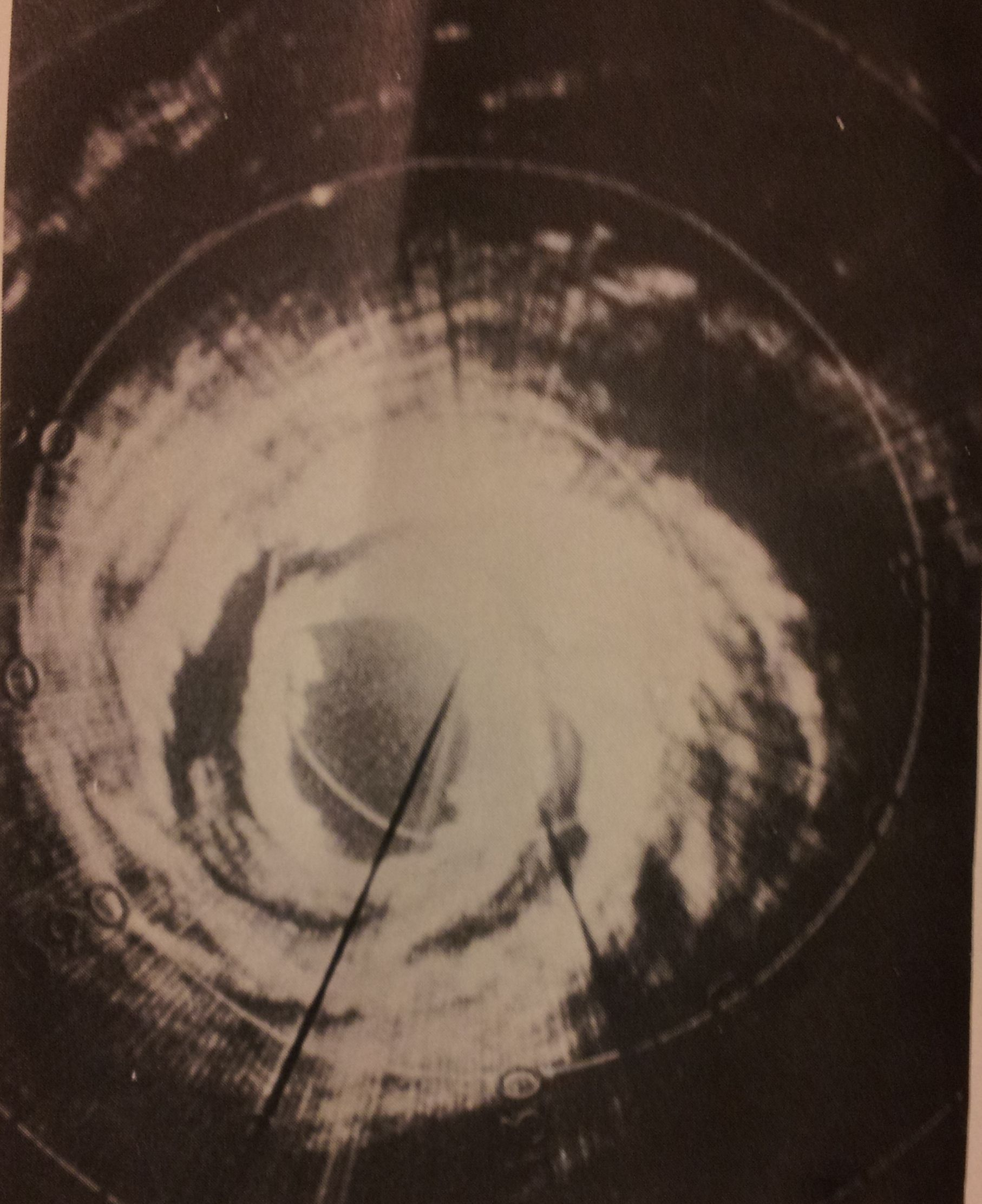
- Duration: August 14 – August 25
- Peak intensity: 125 mph (205 km/h) (1-min); 950 mbar (hPa)

On August 14, a tropical wave developed into a tropical depression while located about midway between the Lesser Antilles and the coast of Africa. The following day, the depression strengthened into Tropical Storm Debbie. By 12:00 UTC on August 16, Debbie became a Category 1 hurricane, and continued intensification led to its first peak of 105 mph (169 km/h) by 18:00 UTC on August 17. Debbie then began oscillating between a Category 1 and a Category 2 hurricane for the next few days, possibly due to being seeded by silver iodide as part of Project Stormfury, though reanalysis suggested that an eyewall replacement cycle was the culprit instead. Debbie was chosen as a test for Project Stormfury because it did not threaten any land, it passed within range of seeding aircraft, and was intense with a distinct eye.

Moving northwestward, Debbie began re-intensifying on August 19, becoming Category 3 hurricane with winds of 115 mph (185 km/h) by 18:00 UTC. By 00:00 UTC on August 20, Debbie peaked with winds of 125 mph (201 km/h), which it maintained for a full day. The storm's minimum barometric pressure of 950 mbar (28 inHg) was measured by hurricane hunters during this timeframe. Debbie curved northeastward as Hurricane Camille moved offshore the East Coast of the United States, weakening to a Category 2 hurricane early on August 21. Gradually losing strength, Debbie passed well to the southeast of Bermuda, although it is believed that if not for the presence of nearby Hurricane Camille, which emerged into the Atlantic from the United States on August 20, Debbie would have likely ended up further west, closer to the island. Debbie accelerated and fell to below Category 2 intensity by 12:00 UTC on August 23. Six hours later Debbie became extratropical while still bearing hurricane-force winds, shortly before passing just offshore Newfoundland. The remnants of Debbie turned northeastward and deteriorated to gale strength late on August 24. About three days later, Debbie's remnants dissipated about 225 mi (362 km) east-northeast of Cape Farewell, Greenland. In Newfoundland, wind gusts up to 85 mph (137 km/h) were observed in St. John's, while rainfall up to 0.98 in (25 mm) was recorded along the Avalon and Bonavista peninsulas. The remnants of Debbie began to lose definition as they accelerated northeastward, while moving over increasingly cold waters. Debbie's remnants finally dissipated west of Norway on August 27.

=== Hurricane Camille ===
- Category 5 hurricane (SSHWS)
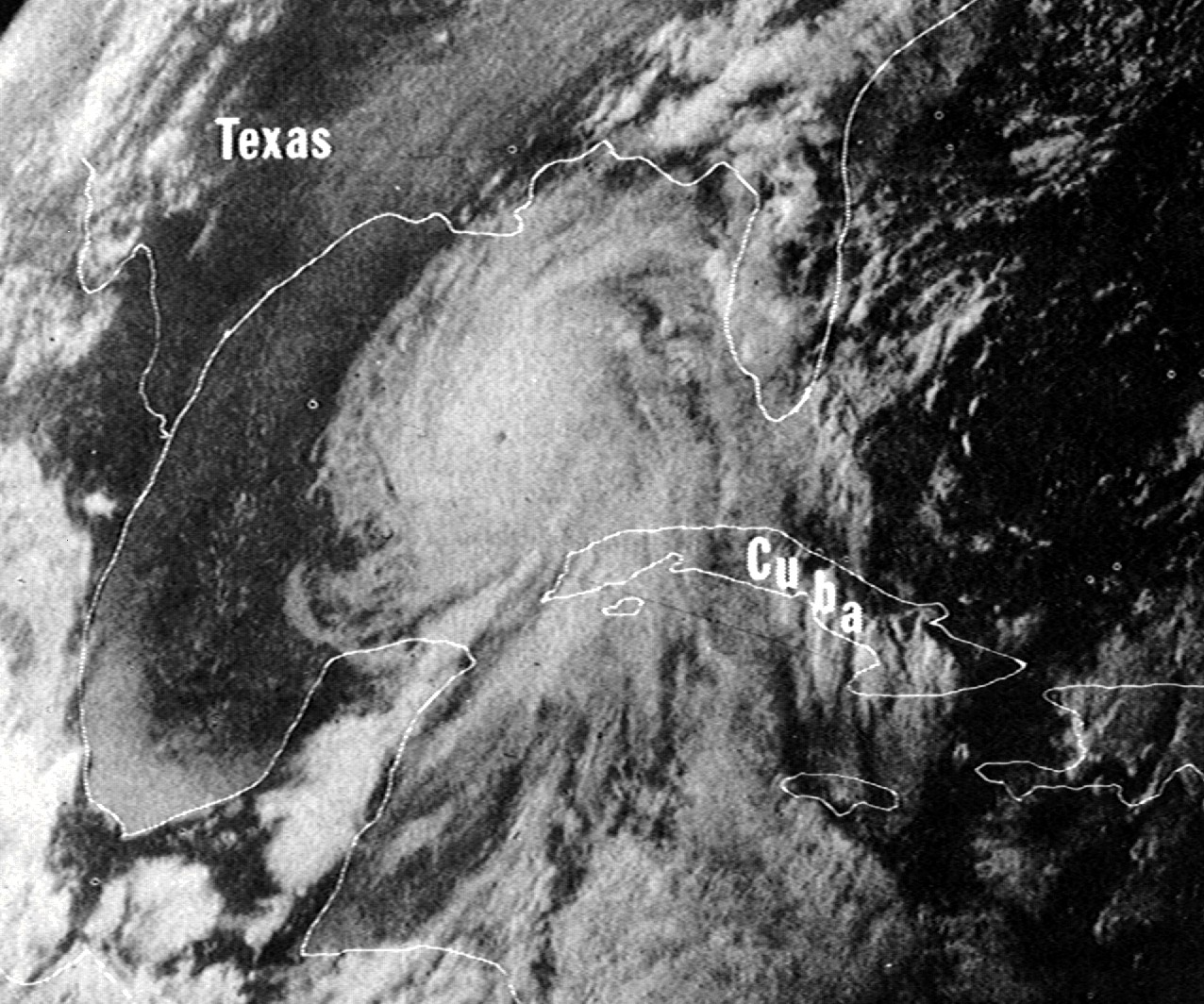
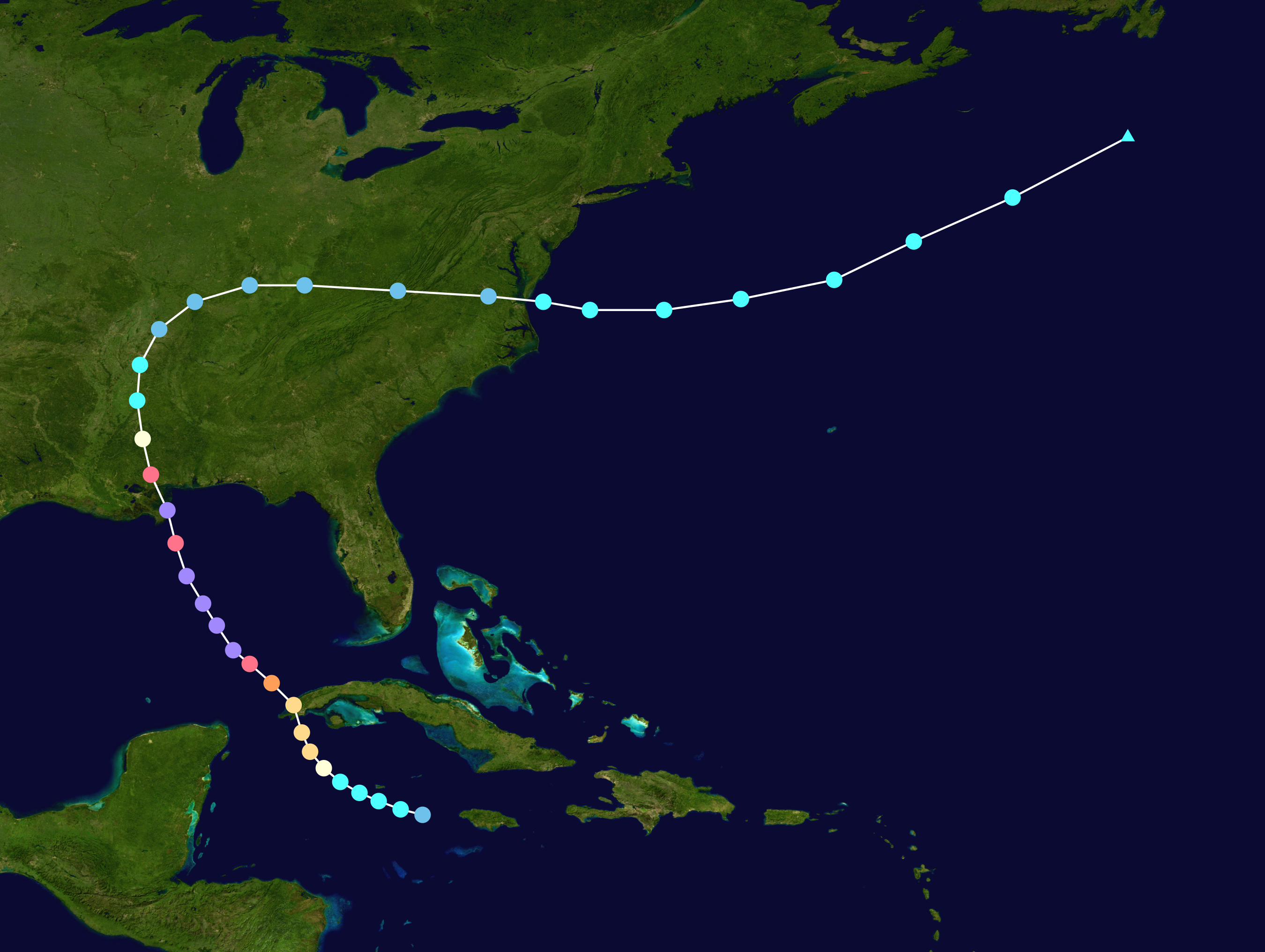
- Duration: August 14 – August 22
- Peak intensity: 175 mph (280 km/h) (1-min); 900 mbar (hPa)

A tropical disturbance moved off the west coast of Africa on August 5, and developed into Tropical Storm Camille near Grand Cayman on August 14. The storm strengthened quickly into a strong Category 2 hurricane with winds of 110 mph (180 km/h) when it struck near the western tip of Cuba on August 15. The storm damaged 100 homes on Isla de la Juventud, while 20,000 residents were left homeless on the mainland; five fatalities were also reported and damages reached $5 million. Early on August 16, Camille emerged into the Gulf of Mexico. Between August 16–17, the storm rapidly deepened, attaining a minimum barometric pressure of 905 mb (26.7 inHg), along with maximum sustained winds of 175 mph (282 km/h), making it a Category 5 hurricane. After briefly weakening to Category 4 intensity near the Mississippi River Delta, Camille re-intensified prior to landfall near Waveland, Mississippi, early on August 18, becoming one of only four tropical cyclones to strike the mainland United States as a Category 5, the others being the 1935 Labor Day hurricane, Hurricane Andrew in 1992, and Hurricane Michael in 2018. With winds of 175 mph (282 km/h) and an estimated pressure of 900 mb (27 inHg) at landfall, Camille was the second strongest and next most intense hurricane to strike the mainland United States, as measured by wind and pressure, respectively, after the 1935 hurricane. Mississippi bore the brunt of Hurricane Camille. A combination of strong winds—estimated at up to 200 mph (320 km/h) in gusts—and large storm surges caused adverse impact in the state. In Mississippi alone, 3,881 dwellings were destroyed and 41,848 were damaged. About 406 trailers were destroyed and an additional 325 suffered major losses. An estimated 645 farm buildings were destroyed and another 2,002 received major damage. In addition, 569 small businesses were impacted.

In Mississippi's neighboring states of Alabama and Louisiana, 1,781 homes were destroyed and 6,000 others were inflicted losses. About 676 trailers were demolished and 296 were severely impacted. Additionally, 124 small businesses were either destroyed or incurred major damage. Camille rapidly weakened after landfall on August 18 and was only a tropical depression about 24 hours later. However, the storm maintained intensity as it recurved to the east over the Ohio River Valley. It dropped heavy rainfall while approaching the Atlantic Ocean, especially in Virginia. Up to 27 in (690 mm) fell in west central Nelson County. In Nelson County alone, 133 bridges washed out, while in some places entire communities were under water. Rivers crested at record heights, causing severe flooding. In the state of Virginia and West Virginia combined, an estimated 349 homes were destroyed and 2,587 received damage to some degree. Eighty-three trailers were demolished and 71 others received major losses. Reportedly, 730 farm buildings were destroyed and 535 were inflicted minor damage. Ninety-six small businesses were also severely damaged or destroyed. Along its path, rainfall was recorded in several other states, including Arkansas, Delaware, Florida, Georgia, Illinois, Indiana, Maryland, New Jersey, North Carolina, Ohio, Pennsylvania, South Carolina, and Tennessee. After reaching the Atlantic, Camille re-strengthened into a strong tropical storm with winds of 70 mph (110 km/h) on August 21, but was absorbed by a cold front south of Newfoundland on August 22. With losses estimated at $1.42 billion, Camille was considered the costliest hurricane in United States history at the time. Additionally, there were 256 deaths in the United States.

=== Tropical Storm Eve ===
- Tropical storm (SSHWS)
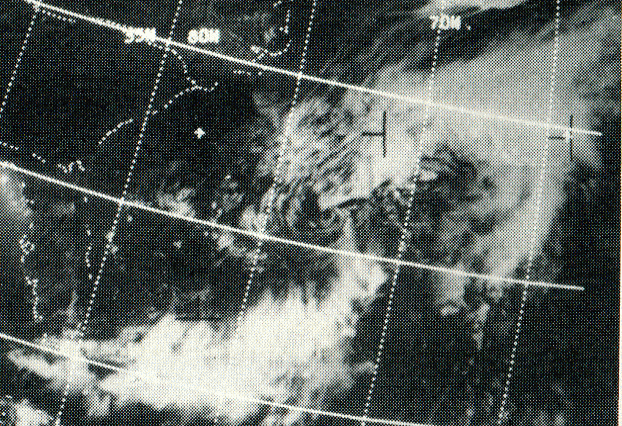
- Duration: August 24 – August 27
- Peak intensity: 50 mph (85 km/h) (1-min); 995 mbar (hPa)

In the wake of Hurricane Camille, a quasi-stationary front moved across the Southern United States and became situated over North Florida. A cut-off low pressure area developed along the system and acquired a low-level circulation. By 0000 UTC on August 25, the system was classified as a tropical depression while located about 100 mi (160 km) east of Jacksonville, Florida. Due to cold air in the region, the depression strengthened slowly while tracking nearly due east. Late on August 25, it was upgraded to Tropical Storm Eve.

On August 26, the National Hurricane Center noted although conditions would prevent rapid deepening, further intensification was possible. The storm threatened the Mid-Atlantic states and Bermuda, but remained offshore and caused no impacts in either region. Eve strengthened slightly on August 26, reaching maximum sustained winds of 60 mph (97 km/h). Although the storm weakened later that day, Eve reached its minimum barometric pressure of 996 mbar (29.4 inHg). Early on August 2, Eve was downgraded to a tropical depression. It began to succumb to the effects of cold air, which entrained the circulation of the storm. At 0000 UTC on August 28, Eve degenerated into a trough of low pressure while located about 70 mi (110 km) west-northwest of Bermuda.

=== Hurricane Francelia ===
- Category 2 hurricane (SSHWS)
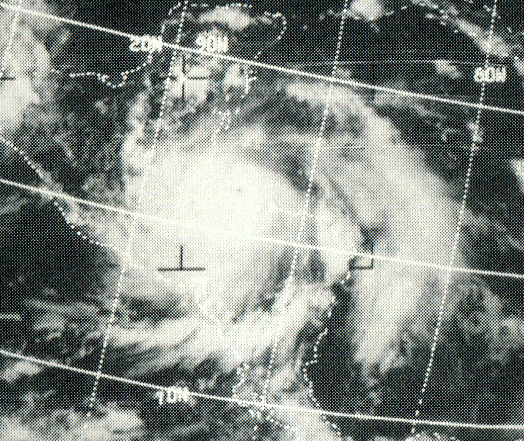
- Duration: August 29 – September 4
- Peak intensity: 100 mph (155 km/h) (1-min); 973 mbar (hPa)

A tropical wave developed into a tropical depression near the Windward Islands on August 29. Initially, the depression slowly strengthened while moving west-northwestward and was upgraded to Tropical Storm Francelia until more than 24 hours later. While located north of Honduras, it curved west-southwestward and was upgraded to a hurricane on September 1. Late on September 3, Francelia made landfall near Punta Gorda, Belize with winds of 100 mph (160 km/h). The storm quickly weakened inland, and less than 24 hours later, it dissipated over northern Guatemala. However, the remnants of Francelia later contributed to the development of Hurricane Glenda in the eastern Pacific Ocean.

During its early stages, Francelia brought gusty winds and light rainfall to several islands in the Caribbean Sea. While remaining nearly stationary offshore Central America, heavy precipitation fell in some countries, especially Guatemala where severe flooding killed 269 people and caused $15 million in damage. Throughout the country, approximately 10,200 people were left homeless. In neighboring Honduras, the hurricane caused damage in the northern portions of the country, with the offshore Bay Islands Department being particularly hard hit. There, the storm damaged or destroyed the majority of two towns. In El Salvador, flooding isolated towns for several days and caused crop damage. Coastal areas of Belize lost electricity and telephone service, and high winds resulted in extensive damage to banana crops. A number of rivers in the region flooded, including the Belize River, which reached 36 ft (11 m) above normal. Francelia ranked as the deadliest tropical cyclone in Guatemala, until Hurricane Mitch in 1998. Overall damage was estimated at $35.6 million, and there were 271 deaths.

=== Early September tropical depression ===
- Tropical depression (SSHWS)
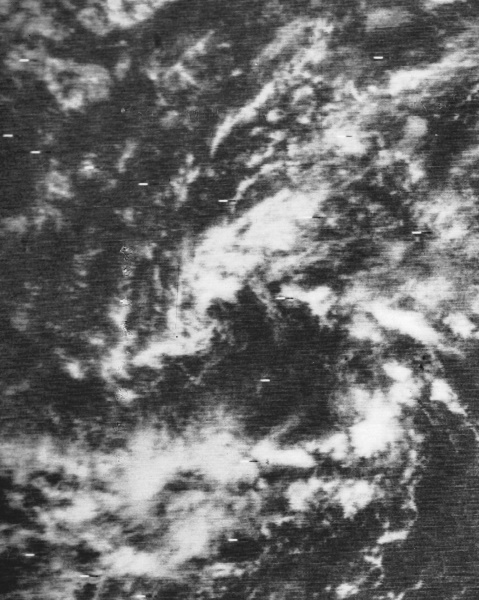
- Duration: September 7 – September 10
- Peak intensity: 35 mph (55 km/h) (1-min);

A tropical depression exited the coast of Africa on September 5 and proceeded westward. Two days later, it developed into a tropical depression, with winds of around 35 mph (56 km/h). At that time, the system had a tight circulation with organized convection over the center. On September 9, the system began weakening, dissipating a day later. The remnants eventually crossed the Lesser Antilles on September 13.

=== Hurricane Gerda ===
- Category 3 hurricane (SSHWS)
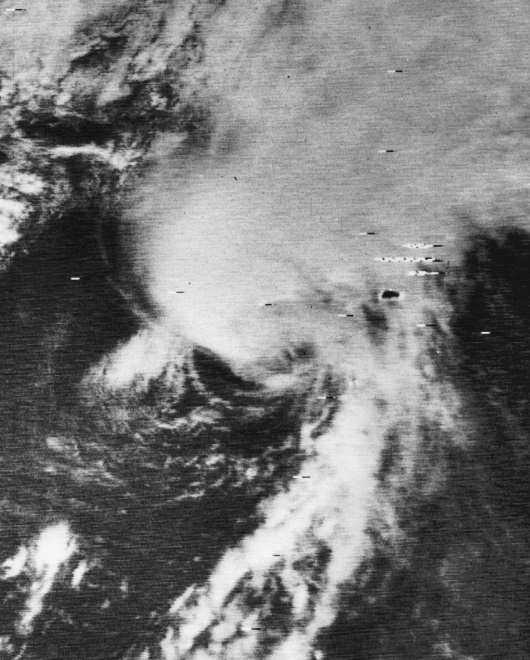
- Duration: September 7 – September 10
- Peak intensity: 120 mph (195 km/h) (1-min); 980 mbar (hPa)

A tropical wave located over the central Bahamas developed into a tropical depression on September 6. The depression moved northwestward and initially remained disorganized. By early on September 7, the depression made landfall near West Palm Beach, Florida. Impact in the state was minimal, limited mostly to light rainfall. Later on September 7, the depression reemerged into the Atlantic Ocean just south of Cape Canaveral. It began to strengthen on the following day and was upgraded to Tropical Storm Gerda at 0600 UTC. By late on September 8, Gerda intensified into a hurricane. The storm deepened significantly further, peaking with winds of 120 mph (190 km/h) on September 9. Early on September 10, Gerda weakened slightly while approaching New England and Atlantic Canada.

It made landfall near Eastport, Maine, at 01:00 UTC on September 10, becoming the only hurricane on record to have impacted the state. Despite landfall as a Category 1 hurricane, the strongest sustained wind speed recorded was 60 mph (97 km/h) in Washington County, Maine as the sheared nature kept the strongest winds farther east. Twenty-four-hour rainfall amounts exceeding 4 in (100 mm) were observed in some areas of New England, with a precipitation peak of 5.67 in (144 mm) in Wellfleet, Massachusetts. Due to the winds and rainfall, portions of Maine, Massachusetts, and New Hampshire reported power outages and localized flooding. By 0600 UTC on September 10, Gerda became extratropical over southeastern Quebec. In Atlantic Canada, winds left many without electricity in New Brunswick and Nova Scotia, and left about $3.5 million in losses to apple crops.

=== Hurricane Holly ===
- Category 1 hurricane (SSHWS)
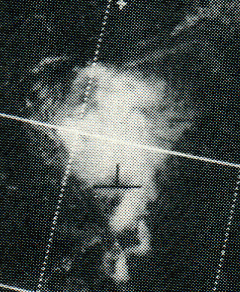
- Duration: September 13 – September 18
- Peak intensity: 80 mph (130 km/h) (1-min); 984 mbar (hPa)

A tropical wave emerged into the Atlantic Ocean from the west coast of Africa on September 8. Moving westward to west-northwestward, it developed into a tropical depression at 1200 UTC on September 14, while located about 1,250 mi (2,010 km) southeast of Puerto Rico, based on Hurricane Hunter observations of an organized circulation. It quickly organized and was soon upgraded to Tropical Storm Holly. Continuing northwestward, it steadily intensified, and the Hurricane Hunters reported that Holly attained hurricane status on September 16, with peak winds of 85 mph (137 km/h) and a minimum barometric pressure of 984 mbar (29.1 inHg).

On September 16, Holly weakened slightly while turning westward toward the Lesser Antilles. Due to the lack of good upper-level outflow, as well as unfavorable water, Holly quickly weakened to tropical storm status on September 18, as confirmed by the Hurricane Hunters. By the next day, it weakened to tropical depression status and later moved through the Lesser Antilles. Holly dissipated on September 21 in the Caribbean Sea, while situated between the Los Roques archipelago of Venezuela and Puerto Rico.

=== Mid-September tropical depression ===
- Tropical depression (SSHWS)
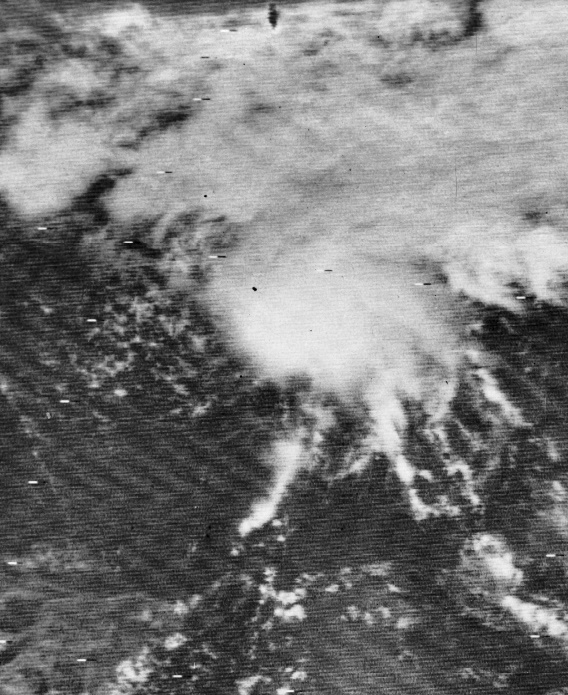
- Duration: September 19 – September 23
- Peak intensity: 35 mph (55 km/h) (1-min); 1007 mbar (hPa)

Ship reports on September 19 indicated the presence of low pressure area in the Gulf of Mexico, centered about 300 mi (480 km) west-northwest of Key West, Florida. It is estimated that a tropical depression developed at 1200 UTC on that day. The depression headed north-northwestward and did not strengthen significantly, although it may have briefly become a tropical storm. By early on September 21, the depression made landfall between Panama City and Port St. Joe, Florida. It degenerated into a remnant low pressure area only a few hours later. A high-pressure ridge blocked the system's movement, moving it to the east. By September 23, the system became a low pressure trough. Upper-level wind shear moved the circulation to the east-northeast and moved into the Atlantic Ocean the next day.

Rainfall in Florida peaked at 23.4 in (590 mm) in Havana, and exceeding 15 in (380 mm) in most of the central Panhandle. Many bridges and roads were washed out or inundated by water, including portions of U.S. Route 98 and State Road 20 between Tallahassee and Panama City. In addition, a tornado spawned by the depression destroyed a trailer, damaged 30 homes, and toppled ballpark bleachers, fences, lights, and electrical poles. Damage in Florida reached almost $3.78 million, including $1.65 million to crops and $2.135 million to property. In southwest Georgia, precipitation totals exceeding 5 in (130 mm) were common, while rainfall peaked at 14 in (360 mm) in southern Decatur County. Severe local flooding ensued, causing damage to property and crops, mostly to peanuts that were not threshed. Up to 7 in (180 mm) of rainfall fell in Alabama, while precipitation totals reached 3 in (76 mm) in Tennessee, South Carolina, North Carolina, and Virginia.

=== Hurricane Inga ===
- Category 2 hurricane (SSHWS)
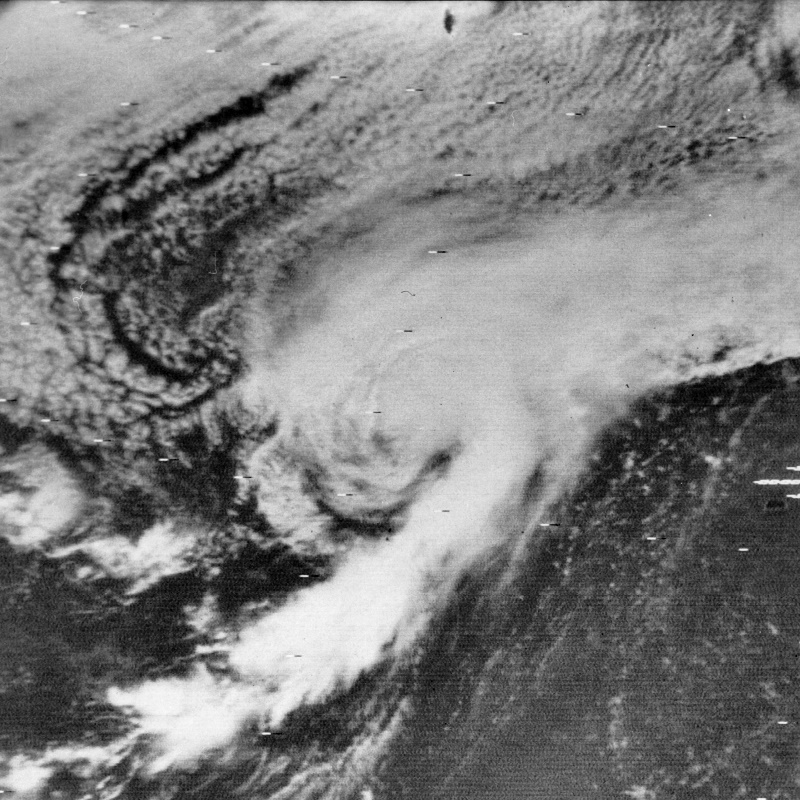
- Duration: September 20 – October 15
- Peak intensity: 110 mph (175 km/h) (1-min); 964 mbar (hPa)

A tropical disturbance developed into a tropical depression on September 20. By the following day, it strengthened into Tropical Storm Inga while centered about 930 mi (1,500 km) east-southeast of San Juan, Puerto Rico. At the time, the storm was moving westward at 14 mph (23 km/h). On September 23, Inga became sprawling and weakened to a tropical depression. Passing north of the Leeward Islands, Inga restrengthened into a tropical storm on September 28. It The depression continued west-northwestward, passing north of the Leeward Islands, before drifting northwestward. It once again attained tropical storm status on September 28, and Inga attained hurricane status on September 30. Around that time, steering currents became weak, and Inga executed a counter-clockwise loop. It curved northeastward and passed southeast of Bermuda on October 5. Later that day, Inga peaked as a strong Category 2 with maximum sustained winds of 110 mph (180 km/h) and a minimum barometric pressure of 964 mbar (28.5 inHg). Inga encountered cooler waters and drier air, causing it to weaken lose tropical characteristics. The hurricane briefly re-strengthened, but again weakened as it turned southward. Inga deteriorated to a tropical storm on October 10. Heading westward, Inga was downgraded to a tropical depression, before dissipating fully on October 15, while located about 290 mi (470 km) from where it initially attained hurricane status. Lasting 24 days, Inga was among the longest-lasting Atlantic tropical cyclones on record.

The hurricane produced wind gusts up to 80 mph (130 km/h) on Bermuda, though minimal impact occurred other than brief power outages.

=== September hurricane ===
- Category 1 hurricane (SSHWS)
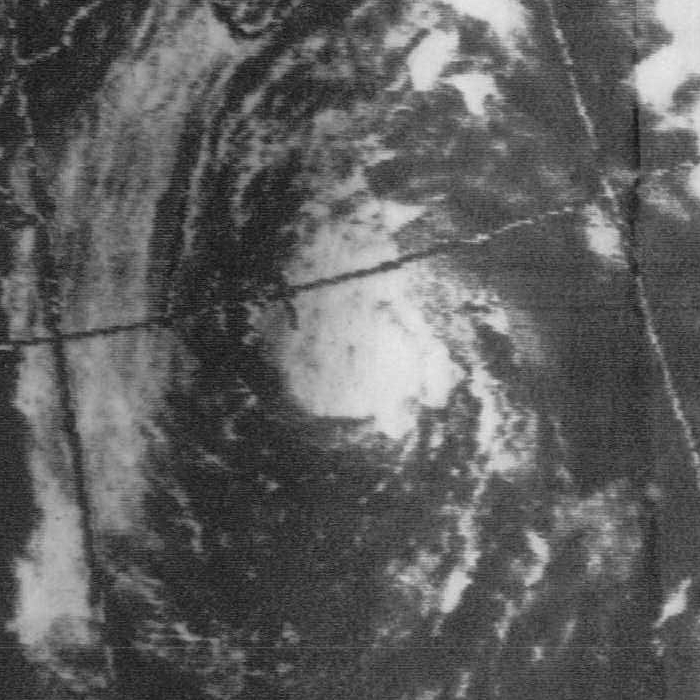
- Duration: September 21 – September 29
- Peak intensity: 75 mph (120 km/h) (1-min); 987 mbar (hPa)

A subtropical depression formed approximately 270 mi (435 km) east-southeast of Cape Hatteras, North Carolina, around 12:00 UTC on September 21. Six hours later, the system intensified into a subtropical storm as it headed east-northeastward. The storm curved northeastward by September 24 and transitioned into a hurricane that day, peaking with maximum sustained winds of 75 mph (121 km/h) and a minimum barometric pressure of 987 mbar (29.1 inHg). Shortly thereafter, the hurricane began accelerating, before dissipating about 200 mi (320 km) south of Newfoundland early on September 26.

=== September tropical storm ===
- Tropical storm (SSHWS)
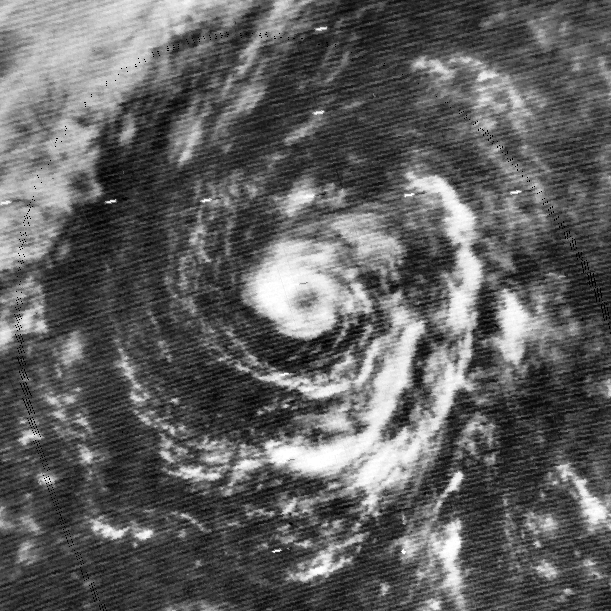
- Duration: September 23 – September 30
- Peak intensity: 70 mph (110 km/h) (1-min); ≤1004 mbar (hPa)

A tropical storm developed from a subtropical depression southwest of the Azores on September 24. After a day of drifting west-southwest, it moved westward where it became a subtropical storm, and later a tropical storm on September 26. The cyclone reached peaked with maximum sustained winds of 70 mph (110 km/h) on September 27 while moving northward. Satellite estimates suggest that it may have reached hurricane intensity but such could not be concluded by other data. It retained that intensity for two days, but on September 30, it became extratropical well east of Newfoundland.

=== Subtropical Storm One ===
- Subtropical storm (SSHWS)
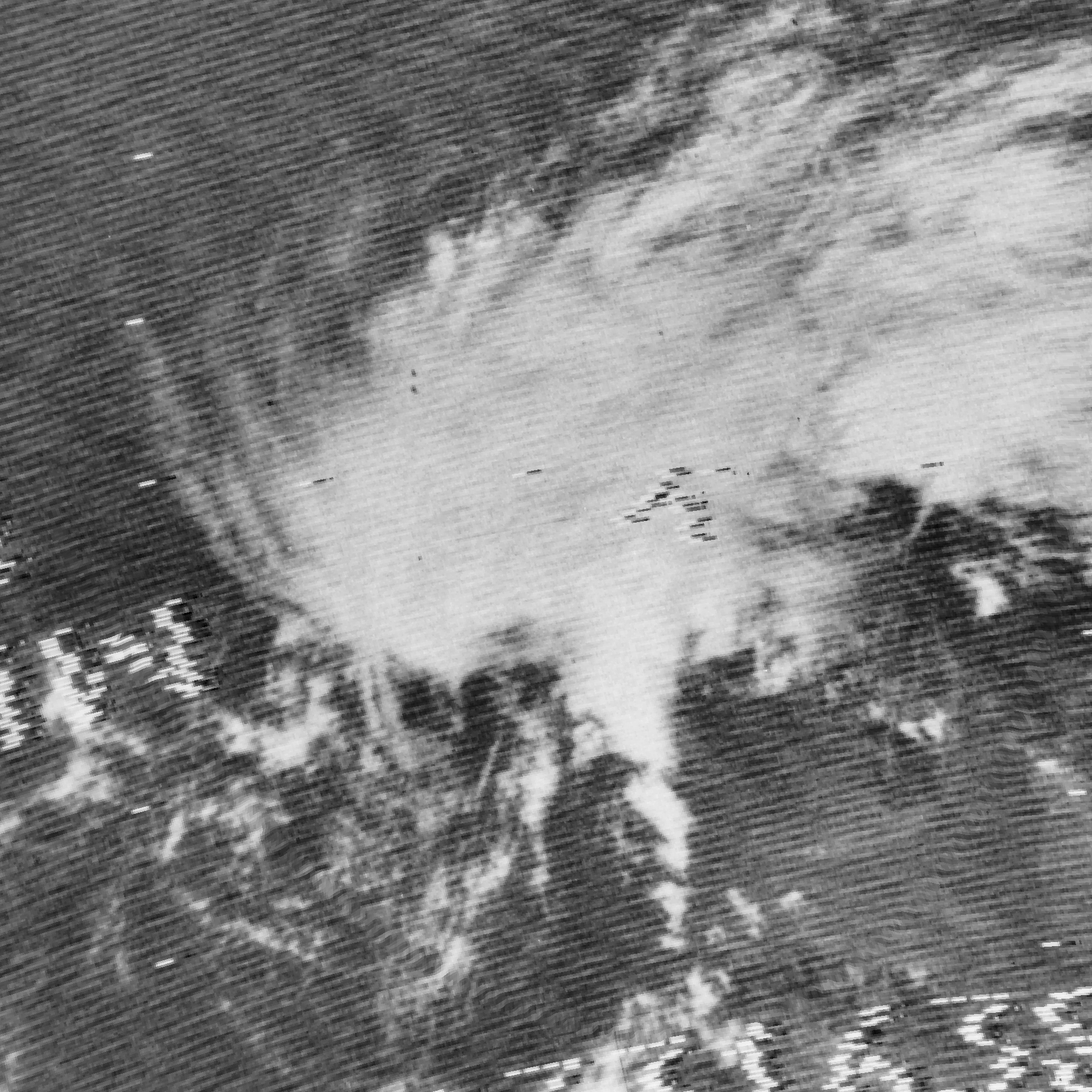
- Duration: September 29 – October 3
- Peak intensity: 60 mph (95 km/h) (1-min); 995 mbar (hPa)

An upper-level low pressure area in the southeastern Gulf of Mexico spawned a subtropical depression at 1200 UTC on September 29. Operationally, it was classified as Tropical Depression Thirty-Two. Six hours later, the strengthened into a subtropical storm. Early on the following day, the storm peaked with maximum sustained winds of 60 mph (97 km/h). It maintained that intensity for about 24 hours, before cool air and wind shear began weakening the storm early on October 1. Shortly thereafter, the storm weakened back to a subtropical depression, a few hours prior to landfall near Fort Walton Beach, Florida. The subtropical depression rapidly dissipated inland.

Rainfall was relatively light and the heaviest amounts were displaced far east of the track, with precipitation peaking at 6.74 inches (171 mm) in Saint Augustine, Florida. Closer to the location of landfall, rainfall reached nearly 4 inches (100 mm) in Pensacola. Several waterspouts were reported in the Panama City area, while a tornado touched down in Carabelle, and another unroofed a home in the St. James community. United States Coast Guard planes searched for three people in a light aircraft that went missing as it traveled from DeFuniak Springs to Sebring. The storm brought rainfall to several others states, reaching as far north as Maine.

=== Tropical Storm Jenny ===
- Tropical storm (SSHWS)
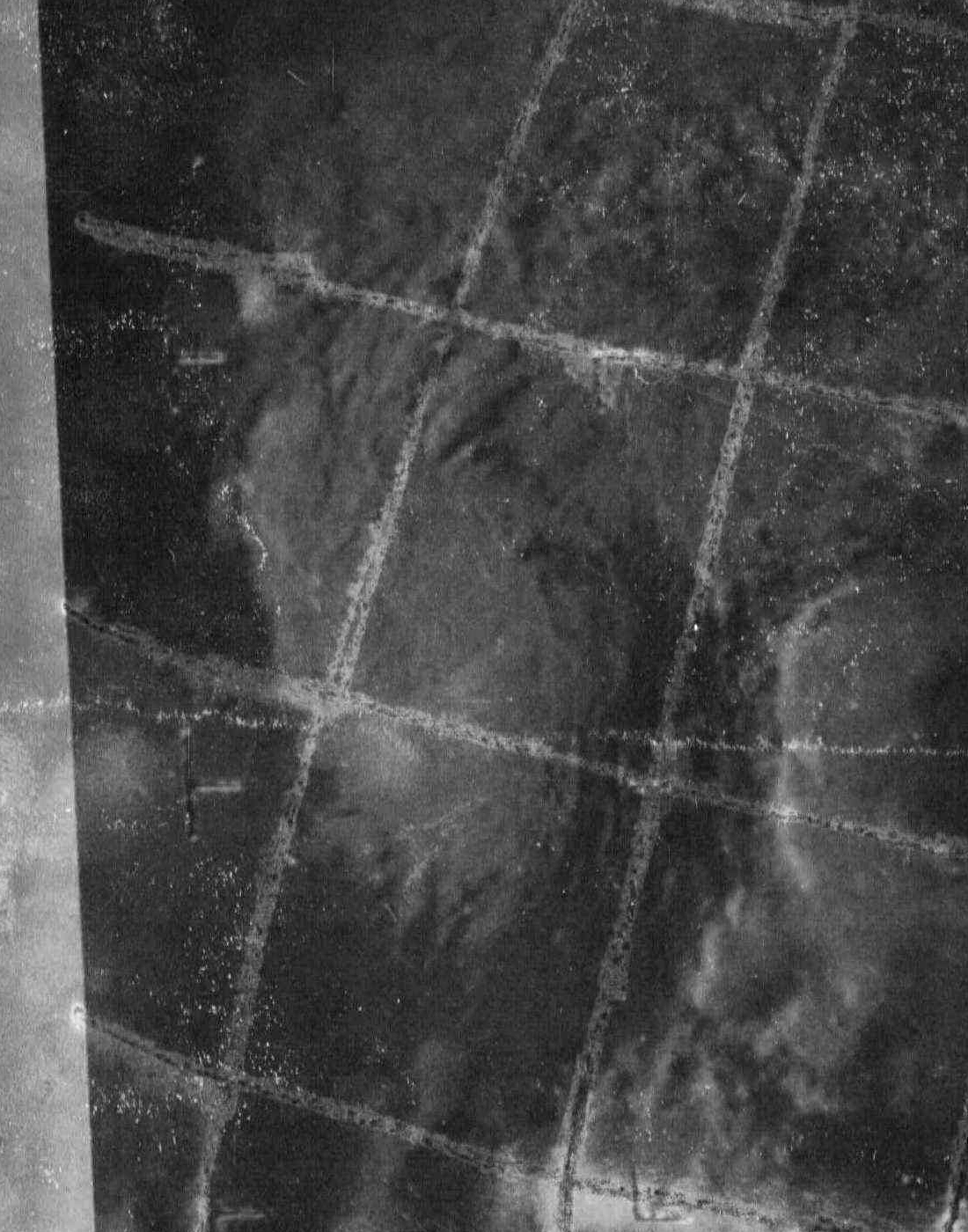
- Duration: October 1 – October 5
- Peak intensity: 45 mph (75 km/h) (1-min); 1000 mbar (hPa)

On October 1, a tropical depression developed over the northwestern Caribbean Sea from the same cut-off low pressure that spawned the previous subtropical storm on September 29. The depression moved quickly north-northeastward and struck Cuba early on October 2. While approaching the southwest coast of Florida later that day, the system intensified into Tropical Storm Jenny. Simultaneously, Jenny attained its peak intensity with winds of 45 mph (72 km/h) and a minimum pressure of 1,000 mbar (30 inHg). Around 0000 UTC on October 2, the storm made landfall between Fort Myers and Naples, Florida, with winds of 40 mph (64 km/h). Jenny emerged into the western Atlantic as a tropical depression, but increased ridging forced the storm to track west-southwestward back over Florida. The cyclone was unable to re-strengthen and dissipated on October 6 south of Louisiana.

The storm crossed Cuba as a tropical depression. Minimal impact was reported. The storm produced moderate to heavy rainfall over parts of the Florida Peninsula, peaking at 6.61 in (168 mm) near Deland. Minor road washouts were reported in Lee County. Rainfall along the lower Kissimmee River and the Lake Okeechobee basin caused some pastures and flood plain areas to be inundated by water. Lake Kissimmee rose 1.5 ft (0.46 m) in height due to precipitation. Jenny's remnants later contributed to the development of heavy rains in southern Louisiana.

=== Hurricane Kara ===
- Category 1 hurricane (SSHWS)
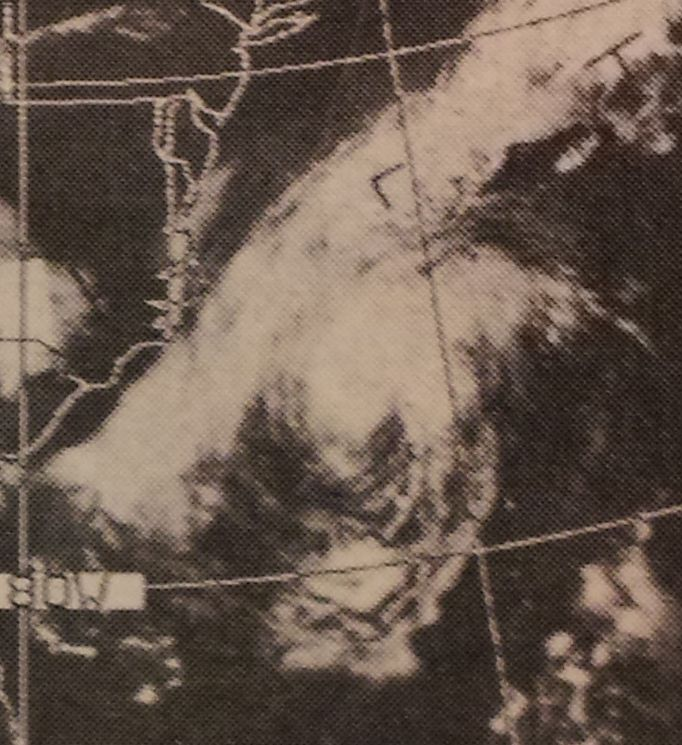
- Duration: October 7 – October 19
- Peak intensity: 90 mph (150 km/h) (1-min); 978 mbar (hPa)

A cold core trough of low pressure over the western Atlantic Ocean warmed on the eastern end, becoming a tropical depression on October 7 about 135 mi (217 km) north of Punta Cana, Dominican Republic. The depression passed south of Turks and Caicos Islands and later to the west of Mayaguana. Early on October 9, the system turned northward and intensified into Tropical Storm Kara after several hours. Southwesterly flow associated with an upper-level trough then caused the storm to curve northeastward. On October 10, an upper-level low pressure formed offshore North Carolina. Initially, Kara moved rapidly north-northwest around the low. However, by October 11, Kara and the low merged, resulting in the former moving erratically. While tracking southwestward into warmer ocean temperatures, the storm continued to strengthen.

After executing a small cyclonic loop, Kara developed an eye feature on October 14, before strengthening into a hurricane on October 15. While moving offshore North Carolina, the storm brought tides of 1 to 3 ft (0.30 to 0.91 m) above normal between October 10 and October 15, causing coastal flooding in very low-lying areas. By October 15, an upper-level westerlies forced the storm to move northeastward and accelerate. Kara began losing tropical characteristics and weakening after encountering a cold trough over the northeast Atlantic, falling to tropical storm intensity late on October 18. The storm soon became extratropical about 435 mi (700 km) north-northeast of Corvo Island in the Azores.

=== Hurricane Laurie ===
- Category 1 hurricane (SSHWS)
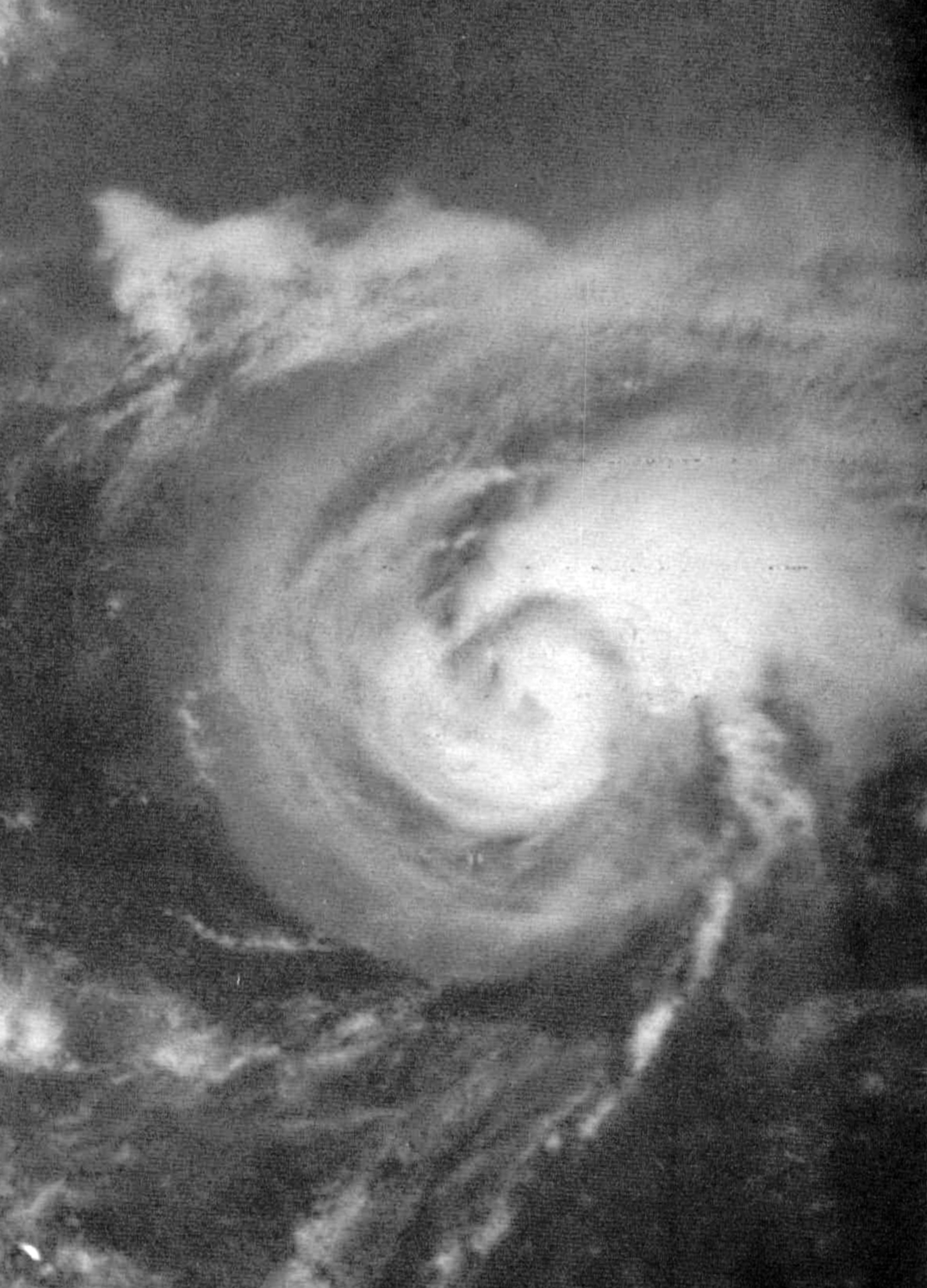
- Duration: October 17 – October 27
- Peak intensity: 90 mph (150 km/h) (1-min); 973 mbar (hPa)

A low pressure area developed into a tropical depression while located about 75 mi (121 km) northeast of Guanaja in the Bay Islands Department of Honduras. Although conditions were favorable for rapid deepening, the depression failed to do so because it was not vertically stacked and struck the Yucatan Peninsula late on October 18. After emerging into the Gulf of Mexico on the following day, the system strengthened into Tropical Storm Laurie. Later on October 19, Laurie curved northward and continued intensifying. At 18:00 UTC on October 20, the storm became a hurricane. It then curved eastward over the central Gulf of Mexico and continued to deepen, peaking as a Category 1 hurricane with sustained winds of 90 mph (140 km/h) and a minimum barometric pressure of 973 mbar (28.7 inHg). Thereafter, drier air began weakening Laurie on October 22. Laurie curved southeastward and then southward, allowing it to remain well offshore the Gulf Coast of the United States.

Early on October 23, the cyclone weakened to a tropical storm while curving west-southwestward. Late the following day, Laurie deteriorated into a tropical depression. After moving southwestward and then southward, the storm made landfall near Paraíso, Tabasco, Mexico, early on October 27. Laurie promptly dissipated. Offshore, oil rig personnel were evacuated as the storm approached. A hurricane watch was issued from Galveston, Texas, to Pensacola, Florida; the watch was extended eastward to Apalachicola, Florida, on October 21. Voluntary evacuations occurred in southern Louisiana out of fear of a storm similar to Hurricane Betsy in 1965 or Camille earlier that year. Impact on land was primarily limited to minor beach erosion. It caused minor damage in the Yucatan Peninsula and in Tabasco.

=== October tropical storm ===
- Tropical storm (SSHWS)
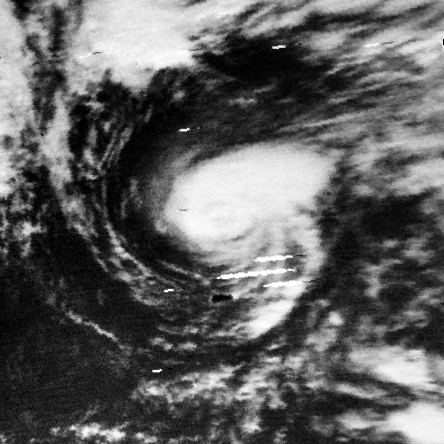
- Duration: October 28 – October 31
- Peak intensity: 70 mph (110 km/h) (1-min); 990 mbar (hPa)

A subtropical depression formed west-southwest of the Azores on October 28. It moved northwestward, reaching tropical storm strength on October 29, and after turning sharply east, the system attained its peak of 70 mph (110 km/h) winds. The storm transitioned into an extratropical on October 31 west of the Azores.

=== October hurricane ===
- Category 1 hurricane (SSHWS)
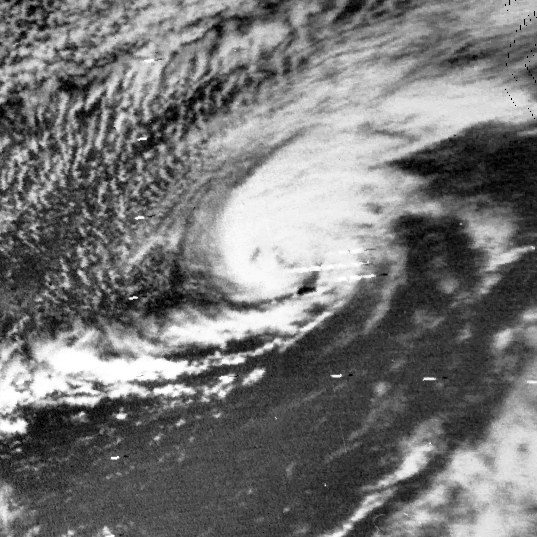
- Duration: October 29 – November 8
- Peak intensity: 90 mph (150 km/h) (1-min); ≤992 mbar (hPa)

A large extratropical storm over the North Atlantic formed a subtropical storm on October 31 south of Newfoundland. It moved southeast, gaining tropical characteristics and strength on the way. It reached hurricane strength on November 4, peaking as a minimal Category 1 storm while approaching the Azores, but weakened prior to passing through the islands. The system transitioned into an extratropical cyclone on November 7.

=== Hurricane Martha ===
- Category 1 hurricane (SSHWS)
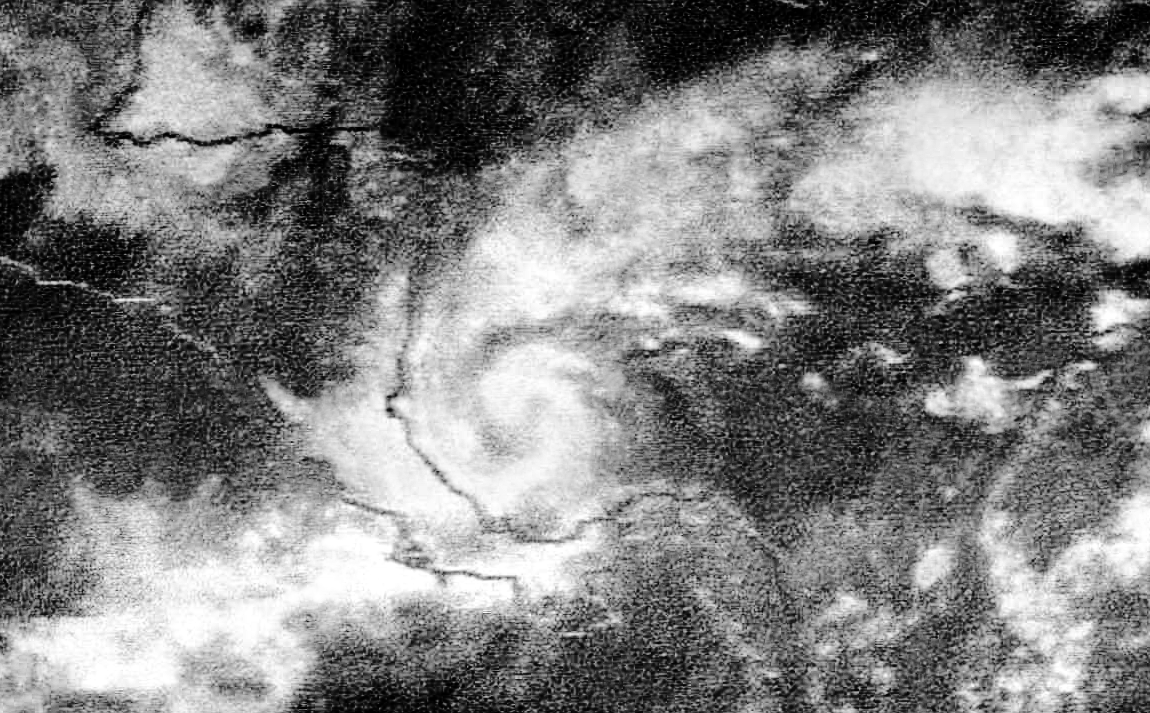
- Duration: November 20 – November 25
- Peak intensity: 90 mph (150 km/h) (1-min); 979 mbar (hPa)

Tropical Storm Martha developed in the southwestern Caribbean Sea on November 21. Initially, the storm developed with sustained winds of 50 mph (80 km/h), skipping tropical depression status. It remained stationary and quickly intensified into a hurricane. Martha attained maximum sustained winds of 90 mph (140 km/h) on November 22. Subsequently, Martha weakened and drifted southward. On November 24, Martha made landfall in Veraguas, Panama, as a strong tropical storm. Martha was the only tropical cyclone on record to make landfall in Panama. The system weakened to a tropical depression and dissipated over land on November 25.

Because the storm weakened prior to landfall, strong winds were not expected or reported in the impacted countries. In Panama, more than 13 inches (330 mm) of precipitation may have fallen in some areas. Agricultural land was flooded in Almirante, Bocas del Toro and streets became inundated in low-lying areas of Puerto Armuelles, Chiriquí. The storm also brought significant rains to Costa Rica. Flooding and mudslides isolated most of the capital city of San José. Numerous streets were inundated in Golfito. Damage in Costa Rica reached $30 million and 5 deaths were reported.

== Storm names ==
The following list of names was used for named storms that formed in the North Atlantic in 1969. This is the same list used in the 1965 season, except for Blanche, Camille, Eve, and Francelia, which replaced Betsy, Carol, Elena, and Frances, respectively. Storms were named Blanche, Camille, Eve, Francelia, Holly, Kara, Laurie and Martha for the first (and in the case of Camille, only) time in 1969.

- Anna
- Blanche
- Camille
- Debbie
- Eve
- Francelia
- Gerda
- Holly
- Inga
- Jenny
- Kara
- Laurie
- Martha
- Netty (unused)
- Orva (unused)
- Peggy (unused)
- Rhoda (unused)
- Sadie (unused)
- Tanya (unused)
- Virgy (unused)
- Wenda (unused)

=== Retirement ===
After the season, the name Camille was retired. The name Cindy was selected to replace Camille in 1973. However, the 4‑year lists then in use were replaced in 1971 by a new series of 10 lists, running through 1980 before recycling.

== Season effects ==
This is a table of all of the storms that formed in the 1969 Atlantic hurricane season. It includes their name, duration, peak classification and intensities, areas affected, damage, and death totals. Deaths in parentheses are additional and indirect (an example of an indirect death would be a traffic accident), but were still related to that storm. Damage and deaths include totals while the storm was extratropical, a wave, or a low, and all of the damage figures are in 1969 USD.

Saffir–Simpson scale
TD	TS	C1	C2	C3	C4	C5

1969 North Atlantic tropical cyclone season statistics
Storm name	Dates active	Storm category at peak intensity	Max 1-min wind mph (km/h)	Min. press. (mbar)	Areas affected	Damage (US$)	Deaths	Ref(s).
Unnamed	June 8–9	Tropical depression	30 (45)	1006	Jamaica, Cuba, Florida	Minimal	None	
Unnamed	July 25–27	Tropical depression	30 (45)	≤1011	Barbados	None	None	
Anna	July 25 – August 4	Tropical storm	70 (110)	1001	None	None	None	
Unnamed	August 7–8	Tropical depression	35 (55)	1010	Veracruz	Minimal	None	
Blanche	August 11–13	Category 1 hurricane	85 (140)	997	Sable Island	None	None	
Debbie	August 14–25	Category 3 hurricane	125 (205)	950	Newfoundland	None	None	
Camille	August 14–22	Category 5 hurricane	175 (280)	900	Southern and Eastern United States	$1.43 billion	259	
Eve	August 24–27	Tropical storm	50 (85)	995	None	None	None	
Francelia	August 29 – September 4	Category 2 hurricane	100 (155)	973	Leeward Islands, Honduras, Guatemala, Belize	$35.6 million	271	
Unnamed	September 7–10	Tropical depression	35 (55)	Unknown	None	None	None	
Gerda	September 7–10	Category 3 hurricane	120 (195)	980	East Coast of the United States, Nova Scotia, New Brunswick	$3.5 million	None	
Holly	September 13–18	Category 1 hurricane	80 (130)	984	Leeward Islands	None	None	
Unnamed	September 19–23	Tropical depression	35 (55)	1007	Cuba, Florida	$3.78 million	None	
Inga	September 20 – October 15	Category 2 hurricane	110 (175)	964	Bermuda	Minimal	None	
Unnamed	September 21–29	Category 1 hurricane	75 (120)	987	None	None	None	
Unnamed	September 23–30	Tropical storm	70 (110)	≤1004	None	None	None	
One	September 29 – October 3	Subtropical storm	60 (95)	995	Florida	None	None	
Jenny	October 1–5	Tropical storm	45 (75)	1000	Cuba, Florida	Minimal	None	
Kara	October 7–19	Category 1 hurricane	90 (150)	978	North Carolina	None	None	
Laurie	October 17–27	Category 1 hurricane	90(150)	973	Yucatan Peninsula and Tabasco	Minimal	None	
Unnamed	October 28–31	Tropical storm	70 (110)	990	None	None	None	
Unnamed	October 29 – November 8	Category 1 hurricane	90 (150)	≤992	None	None	None	
Martha	November 20–25	Category 1 hurricane	90 (150)	979	Costa Rica, Panama	$30 million	5	
Season aggregates
23 systems	June 8 – November 25		175 (280)	900		$1.5 billion	535	

== See also ==
- 1969 Pacific hurricane season
- 1969 Pacific typhoon season
- 1969 North Indian Ocean cyclone season
- South-West Indian Ocean cyclone seasons: 1968–69, 1969–70
- Australian region cyclone seasons: 1968–69, 1969–70
- South Pacific cyclone seasons: 1968–69, 1969–70
