= Hurricane Martha =

Category 1 Atlantic hurricane in 1969

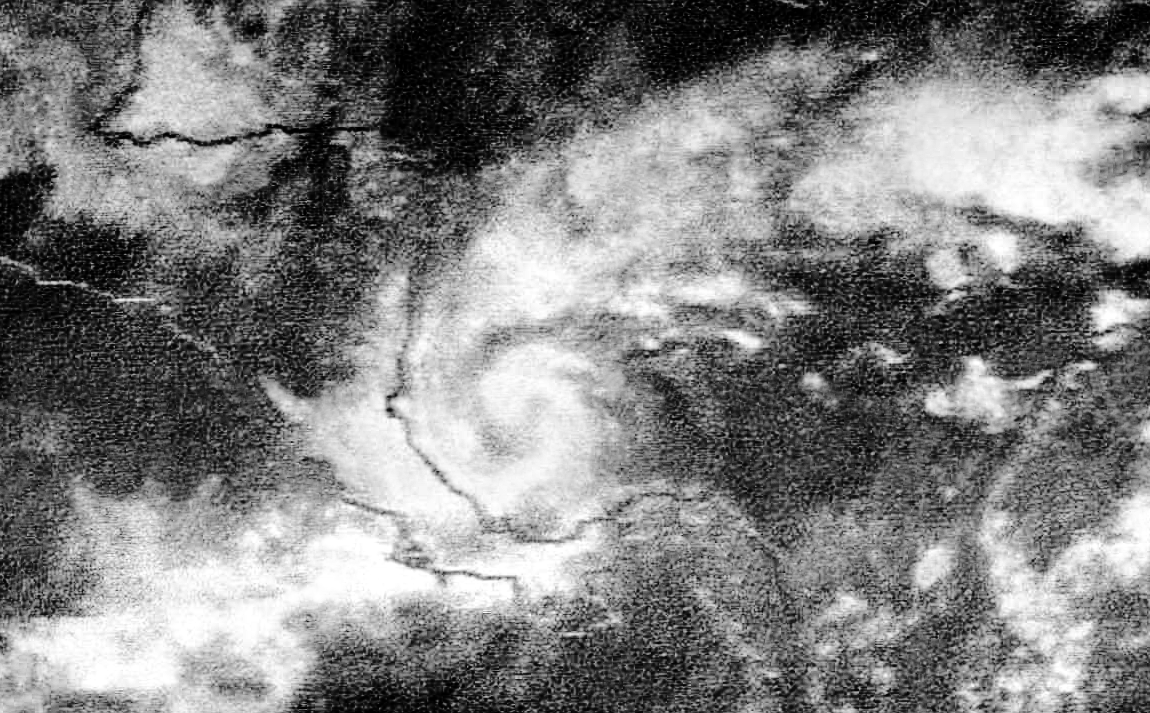
- Hurricane Martha just north of Panama on November 21

Meteorological history
- Formed: November 21, 1969
- Dissipated: November 25, 1969

Category 1 hurricane
- 1-minute sustained (SSHWS/NWS)
- Highest winds: 90 mph (150 km/h)
- Lowest pressure: 979 mbar (hPa); 28.91 inHg

Overall effects
- Fatalities: 5 direct
- Damage: $30 million (1969 USD)
- Areas affected: Panama, Costa Rica
- IBTrACS
- Part of the 1969 Atlantic hurricane season

Hurricane Martha was the only known tropical cyclone to make landfall in Panama. The eighteenth named storm and twelfth hurricane of the 1969 Atlantic hurricane season, Martha developed in the southwestern Caribbean Sea on November 21, with sustained winds of 50 mph (80 km/h). It initially remained stationary, and then quickly intensified into a hurricane. Martha attained maximum sustained winds of 90 mph (145 km/h) on November 22. Subsequently, Martha weakened and drifted southward. On November 24, Martha made landfall in Veraguas Province, Panama, as a strong tropical storm. The system weakened to a tropical depression and dissipated over land on November 25.

Because the storm weakened prior to landfall, strong winds were not expected or reported in the impacted countries. In Panama, more than 13 in (330 mm) of precipitation may have fallen in some areas. Agricultural land was flooded in Almirante, Bocas del Toro and streets became inundated in low-lying areas of Puerto Armuelles, Chiriquí. The storm also brought significant rains to Costa Rica. Flooding and mudslides isolated most of the capital city of San José. Numerous streets were inundated in Golfito. Damage in Costa Rica reached $30 million (1969 USD) and five deaths were reported.

== Meteorological history ==
Map plotting the storm's track and intensity, according to the Saffir–Simpson scale Map key Saffir–Simpson scale Tropical depression (≤38 mph, ≤62 km/h) Tropical storm (39–73 mph, 63–118 km/h) Category 1 (74–95 mph, 119–153 km/h) Category 2 (96–110 mph, 154–177 km/h) Category 3 (111–129 mph, 178–208 km/h) Category 4 (130–156 mph, 209–251 km/h) Category 5 (≥157 mph, ≥252 km/h) Unknown Storm type Tropical cyclone Subtropical cyclone Extratropical cyclone, remnant low, tropical disturbance, or monsoon depression

Winds aloft in the vicinity of San Andrés, Colombia and the Panama Canal Zone indicated that a low-level circulation developed in the southwestern Caribbean Sea on November 20. According to the Best Track, Tropical Storm Martha formed at 1200 UTC on November 21, with an initial wind speed of 50 mph (80 km/h). Thus, Martha skipped tropical depression status. Centered about 100 miles (160 km) northeast of Bocas Town, Bocas del Toro, the storm remained stationary for 24 hours after tropical cyclogenesis. Martha immediately began deepening, becoming a hurricane at 0000 UTC on November 22. Operationally, the National Hurricane Center initiated advisories at 0300 UTC and erroneously indicated that it was a tropical depression and noted that conditions did not favor significant intensification. Later on November 22, a reconnaissance flight indicated Martha deepened to a compact hurricane, and the tropical cyclone attained a maximum sustained wind speed of 90 mph (140 km/h). Reconnaissance aircraft measured a minimum barometric pressure of 980 mbar (29 inHg), though it was later corrected to 979 mbar (28.9 inHg) in the post-season analysis.

The eye feature was about 46 miles (74 km) wide and it was described as poorly organized, although convection was increasing. After reaching peak intensity, Martha began drifting due south and slowly weakened. At 1200 UTC on November 23, the tropical cyclone diminished to a tropical storm, after winds decreased to 70 mph (110 km/h) and a reconnaissance flight recorded an increased barometric pressure of 999 mbar (29.5 inHg). The storm maintained that intensity, and shortly before 1800 UTC on November 24, Martha made landfall in rural Veraguas Province, Panama, about 10 miles (16 km) east of the mouth of the Calovebora River. Operationally, winds were thought to be only 50 mph (80 km/h) when the storm moved inland. Martha was the only tropical cyclone on record to make landfall in Panama, although it is possible that other Panama tropical cyclones were not detected. The storm rapidly weakened inland, deteriorating to tropical depression status early on November 25, twelve hours before dissipating over southern Ngöbe-Buglé Comarca.

== Preparations and impact ==
Residents were warned to anticipate tides 5 feet (1.5 m) above normal near the expected point of landfall. Later, the forecast was decreased to 3 feet (0.91 m) above normal and pertained to tides in the Mosquito Gulf and Chiriqui Lagoon. Since Martha was a relatively weak tropical cyclone, flash floods were emphasized as the greatest threat. The National Hurricane Center stated that rainfall could exceed 10 inches (250 mm). Additionally, Arnold Sugg of National Hurricane Center warned residents of gale-force winds and heavy precipitation, advising people living between Bluefields, Nicaragua and Almirante, Bocas del Toro, Panama to take precautions.

In Panama, the storm dropped at least 13 inches (330 mm) of precipitation, especially in the western portions of the country. As a result, at least half of agricultural land in Almirante, Bocas del Toro was flooded, causing extensive crop damage. In Puerto Armuelles, Chiriquí, persistent rainfall led to street flooding and inundated other areas. Similar conditions were reported in Golfito, Costa Rica. The effects of Martha resulted in five deaths, all of which occurred in Costa Rica. The nation incurred flooding from heavy rainfall, which caused significant destruction. The capital city of San José received flooding. In all, damages were estimated near $30 million (1969 USD).

== See also ==
- List of Category 1 Atlantic hurricanes
- Geography of Panama
- Hurricane Otto (2016) – A late-season Category 3 hurricane that brought heavy rainfall and disastrous flooding to Panama
