= Hurricane Gerda =

Category 3 Atlantic hurricane in 1969

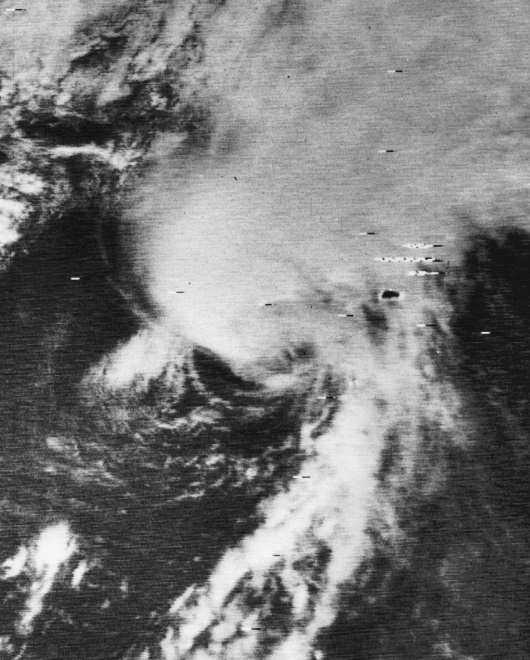
- Gerda approaching New England near peak intensity on September 9

Meteorological history
- Formed: September 6, 1969
- Dissipated: September 11, 1969

Category 3 major hurricane
- 1-minute sustained (SSHWS/NWS)
- Highest winds: 120 mph (195 km/h)
- Lowest pressure: 980 mbar (hPa); 28.94 inHg

Overall effects
- Fatalities: None
- Damage: $3.5 million (1969 USD)
- Areas affected: Florida, North Carolina, New England, Atlantic Canada
- IBTrACS
- Part of the 1969 Atlantic hurricane season

Hurricane Gerda was a damaging Category 3 major hurricane which formed during the 1969 Atlantic hurricane season. It was the seventh named storm, fifth hurricane and third major hurricane of the 1969 season. Gerda formed on September 6 and crossed Florida as a tropical depression. Gerda later became a tropical storm after making a hard right turn and moving northeast and reaching hurricane status on September 8. Gerda brushed past the Outer Banks of North Carolina before reaching maximum intensity of 120 mph (190 km/h) and an unusually high barometric pressure of 980 millibars (29 inHg). On September 10, Gerda made landfall near Eastport, Maine, and became extratropical the following day.

Hurricane Gerda brought light rain across southern Florida and moderate to heavy rain across eastern North Carolina and New England, causing minor damage to trees and powerlines. The highest amount of rain was 5.67 inches (144 mm) which was recorded in South Wellfleet, Massachusetts on Cape Cod. There were no fatalities or injuries from Gerda although planes at Otis Air Force Base were moved to their hangars and two ships from Naval Station Newport left their berth to ride out the storm.

== Meteorological history ==
Map plotting the storm's track and intensity, according to the Saffir–Simpson scale Map key Saffir–Simpson scale Tropical depression (≤38 mph, ≤62 km/h) Tropical storm (39–73 mph, 63–118 km/h) Category 1 (74–95 mph, 119–153 km/h) Category 2 (96–110 mph, 154–177 km/h) Category 3 (111–129 mph, 178–208 km/h) Category 4 (130–156 mph, 209–251 km/h) Category 5 (≥157 mph, ≥252 km/h) Unknown Storm type Tropical cyclone Subtropical cyclone Extratropical cyclone, remnant low, tropical disturbance, or monsoon depression

A tropical wave moved off the western coast of Africa on August 21 and moved westward across the Atlantic Ocean without development. On September 3, the disturbance merged with a dissipating upper-level low pressure system over Hispaniola and Puerto Rico and developed an increasing cloud mass as it continued westward. As the disturbance crossed the Bahamas, satellite imagery showed the disturbance gaining a distinct circulation on September 5. On September 6, the disturbance became a tropical depression before it made landfall in southeastern Florida on the same day.

After crossing Florida, the depression drifted northeastward back over the western Atlantic Ocean on September 7. As the system headed northeastward, hurricane hunter aircraft recorded winds of 45 mph (72 km/h), and barometric pressure fell to 1,000 millibars (30 inHg). Forecasters at the National Hurricane Center upgraded the system to tropical storm status and named it Gerda. Gerda continued to move rapidly northeast in response to an approaching trough and the storm reached hurricane status on September 8. Gerda's forward speed approached 40 mph (64 km/h) as the eye of the hurricane passed 50 miles (80 km) east of Cape Cod on September 9, with maximum sustained winds of 125 mph (201 km/h). Because the storm was interacting with the trough to the west and was moving rapidly northeastward, the result was the minimum central barometric pressure was an unusually high 980 millibars (29 inHg). Gerda later made landfall near Eastport, Maine later that day as a Category 1 hurricane, one of the strongest to ever make landfall in the state. However, while the storm made landfall as a hurricane, the strongest winds remained offshore. Thus, Gerda likely caused only tropical storm force winds in the state. Gerda then became extratropical as it crossed into Canada as an 80 mph (130 km/h) extratropical storm on September 10. The storm later dissipated the following day.

== Preparations ==
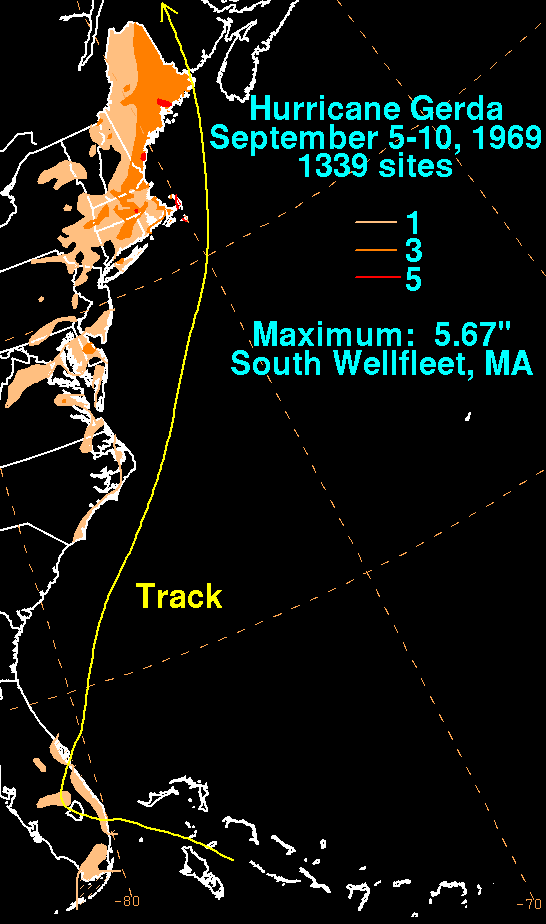
Rainfall from Gerda

Gale warnings and small craft advisories were issued along the coast of North Carolina stretching from Wilmington to Cape Hatteras. Storm shelters in Kitty Hawk and Manteo, North Carolina were opened and the American Red Cross sent relief workers and equipment to North Carolina. In Frederick County, Maryland, local forecasters and the National Weather Service issued a flood watch while the National Hurricane Center issued a hurricane watch for the county, as well as the rest of eastern Maryland. Officials at the National Weather Service and National Hurricane Center predicted that the western half of the storm would lash New York City and much of New England (which were under a hurricane watch) with high winds and torrential rainfall.

Ships and other water craft were advised to avoid the Cape Cod area as the storm was forecast to brush that area, which was put under a hurricane warning by the National Hurricane Center. In Massachusetts, schools were closed and emergency shelters were opened to accommodate evacuees. Evacuations were ordered for residents living in low-lying areas in Cape Cod. In Boston, the threat of the storm caused both elementary and middle schools to close at noon while high schools were closed at 1 p.m. (est). The approach of the storm also postponed a fair at a local hospital and planes at Otis Air Force Base were quickly moved to their hangars. Much of southeastern Massachusetts civil defense and fire departments were alerted in preparation of the storm's impact. In Rhode Island, schools and other buildings were used as shelter to house evacuees. As Hurricane Gerda sped up the East Coast of the United States, the National Hurricane Center extended the hurricane warnings from Block Island, Rhode Island to Eastport, Maine. At Naval Station Newport in Newport, Rhode Island, two ships of the United States Navy left their berths to ride out the storm, one of which was the Comcrudeslant flagship USS Puget Sound (AD-38).

== Impact ==
Hurricane Gerda affected much of eastern North Carolina and New England with gusty rain and heavy rainfall causing minor to moderate damage. In Florida, Gerda dropped light rainfall across southern and central portions of the state. In South Carolina, Gerda brought sustained winds of 20 mph (32 km/h). In North Carolina, Gerda produced moderate rainfall across the Outer Banks. The highest rainfall total on the Outer Banks was 1.32 inches (34 mm) in Cape Hatteras. Elsewhere on the Outer Banks, the storm produced 27 mph (43 km/h) winds with gusts up to 36 mph (58 km/h). A tide gauge in Ocracoke Island reported a tide of 1.5 feet (0.46 meters) above normal. Gerda then dropped heavy rainfall across eastern Virginia, Maryland, New Jersey and New York. Gerda produced heavy rainfall throughout much of southeastern New England. In Massachusetts, a rain gauge in South Wellfleet reported rainfall of 5.67 inches (144 mm). The city of Lowell also reported heavy rainfall from the storm as 2 inches (51 mm) of rain fell in a 24‑hour period. The heavy rainfall caused isolated street flooding due to clogged storm drains. In Fitchburg, the storm dropped 1.87 inches (47 mm) of rain while Cape Cod received tides 3–6 feet (0.91–1.83 meters) above normal. Elsewhere in New England, the storm caused minor damage to trees, powerlines and highways.

In Atlantic Canada, winds left many without electricity in New Brunswick and Nova Scotia, and left about $3.5 million in losses to apple crops. Gerda passed over Labrador as a strong extratropical storm with hurricane-force winds.

== See also ==
- List of New England hurricanes
