= Achiguate River =

River in Guatemala

- Location of mouth
- Native name: Río Achiguate (Spanish)

Location
- Country: Guatemala

Physical characteristics
- Source
  - location: Guatemala (Sacatepéquez, Escuintla)
  - coordinates: 14.449060°N 90.851355°W
  - elevation: 1,710 m (5,610 ft)
- Mouth
  - location: Pacific Ocean
  - coordinates: 13.915364°N 90.908003°W
  - elevation: 0 m (0 ft)

The Río Achiguate (Spanish pronunciation: [atʃiˈɣwate]) is a river in the south of Guatemala. Its sources are located in the Sierra Madre mountain range, on the southern slopes of the Volcán de Fuego in the departments of Sacatepéquez and Escuintla. The river flows southwards through the coastal lowlands of Escuintla into the Pacific Ocean.

The Achiquate's proximity to the active Fuego volcano increases the risks of inundations and mudflows.
