= Hurricane Liza (1968) =

Category 1 Pacific hurricane in 1968

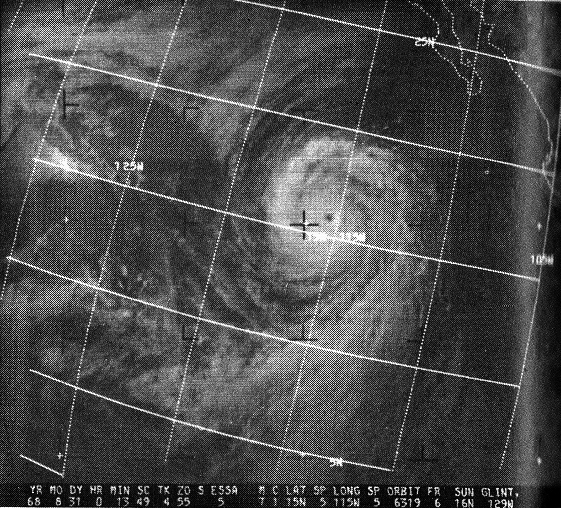
- Hurricane Liza off the Baja California on August 31

Meteorological history
- Formed: August 28, 1968
- Dissipated: September 6, 1968

Category 1 hurricane
- 1-minute sustained (SSHWS/NWS)
- Highest winds: 85 mph (140 km/h)
- Lowest pressure: 998 mbar (hPa); 29.47 inHg

Overall effects
- Fatalities: None
- Damage: $5,000 (1968 USD)
- Areas affected: California
- IBTrACS
- Part of the 1968 Pacific hurricane season

Hurricane Liza was a weak Category 1 hurricane which was the third hurricane of the 1968 Pacific hurricane season. Forming from an area of the Intertropical Convergence Zone (ITCZ) on August 28 and reaching tropical storm strength in the same day, Liza meandered generally westward over the Pacific Ocean, reaching hurricane strength on August 29 while far from land. It maintained that intensity until September 2, when the hurricane was downgraded to a tropical storm, but avoided tropical depression status despite the presentation seen by an Air Force reconnaissance plane. After weakening, the storm moved northwestward, weakening to a depression on September 4, when it began a turn to the east. There is a possibility that the depression completed a small loop between the downgrade and its dissipation on September 6.

Although it remained far from land, the waves triggered by Liza were able to reach California, where they combined with high tide, threatening beachfront homes that had weakened foundations after a previous tide. The hurricane was responsible for sweeping hundreds of Labor Day swimmers out into the ocean in Zuma Beach and Newport Beach, all of whom were saved by lifeguards. The waves also tore off a group of sundecks estimated at $5,000 (1968 USD) near Laguna Beach.

== Meteorological history ==
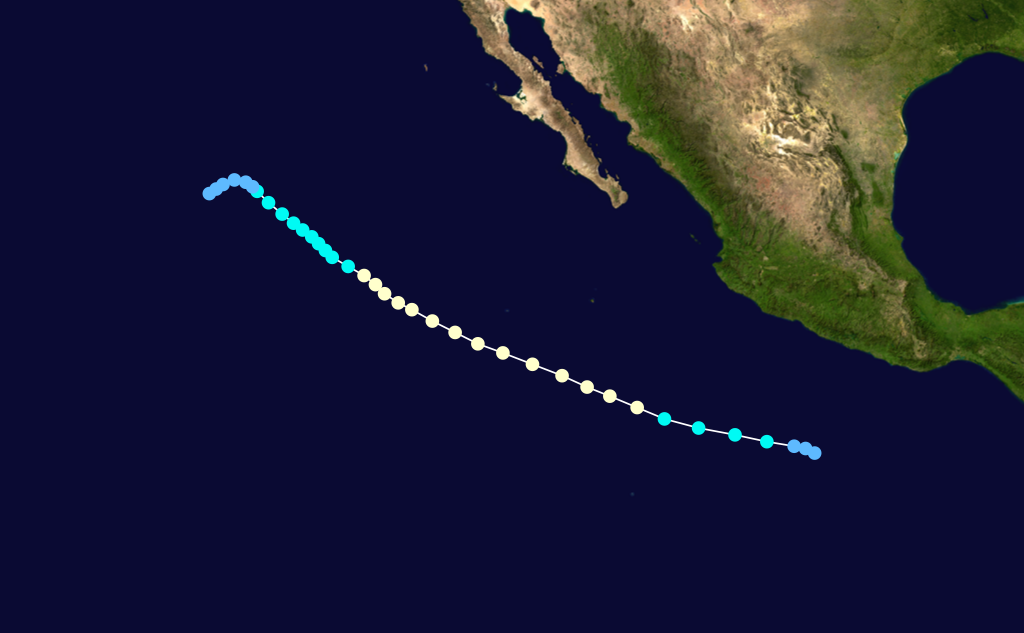
Map plotting the storm's track and intensity, according to the Saffir–Simpson scale Map key Saffir–Simpson scale Tropical depression (≤38 mph, ≤62 km/h) Tropical storm (39–73 mph, 63–118 km/h) Category 1 (74–95 mph, 119–153 km/h) Category 2 (96–110 mph, 154–177 km/h) Category 3 (111–129 mph, 178–208 km/h) Category 4 (130–156 mph, 209–251 km/h) Category 5 (≥157 mph, ≥252 km/h) Unknown Storm type Tropical cyclone Subtropical cyclone Extratropical cyclone, remnant low, tropical disturbance, or monsoon depression

For a period beginning on August 25, the ITCZ was active near the border between Mexico and Guatemala. A report of 40 mph (64 km/h) winds, a barometric pressure of 1010.5 mbar, and heavy thundershowers was received from a Coast Guard cutter called the Androscoggin while the ship was 150 mi (240 km) south of Tehuantepec. The report also mentioned that the thundershowers were generating 9-foot (2.7 m) high swells. The conditions developed in a northward bend in the ITCZ that was moving westward. No activity other than clusters of rain were shown on satellite until August 28, when a tropical disturbance suddenly developed along the bend, reaching tropical depression status as the day began. The depression became Tropical Storm Liza later that day, when the ship Jag Jawan reported winds of 60 mph (97 km/h) and 1003.2 mbar. Another ship named Teverya, which was 60 mi (97 km) northwest of the Jag Jawan, reported similar wind speeds, but a pressure of 998 mbar, the lowest barometric pressure recorded from the storm throughout its life. Satellite pictures showed a vortex arrangement consisting of three cloud masses and two arching bands of cumulonimbus clouds, all of which were producing cirrus outflow.

The tropical storm moved west-northwest for 48 hours after being named, reaching hurricane intensity on August 29, with satellite pictures showing an eye. Until September 1, all ships kept out of range of the hurricane, leaving satellite imagery as the only method for obtaining information. The August 30 ESSA-6 satellite image of the hurricane showed a circular eye embedded in a nearly circular central dense overcast (CDO) spanning 5° of latitude in diameter. Inflow was apparent in feeder bands from the south, but a large area of dry air and clear skies spanned to the north and west of the hurricane. It was estimated that the hurricane was at its peak intensity at this time. On August 31, the CDO had shrunk, but the cyclone still maintained intensity until September 1, when the hurricane had moved over cooler water and began to weaken due to cold inflow. Around this time, an unnamed ship passing north of the center going eastward reported winds of 85 mph (137 km/h) and 40-foot (12 m) to 45-foot (14 m) high seas. The weakening of the hurricane accelerated, becoming uncoupled from the warm waters and losing its cirrus cap, exposing the center. An Air Force reconnaissance plane sent to investigate the storm on September 2 showed that the hurricane had weakened into a tropical storm. However, the cyclone was so disorganized at this time that the observer remarked that there was a possibility that Liza was no longer even a tropical storm. The storm continued to evaporate and was downgraded to a depression on September 4 and drifted southwestward until it dissipated on September 6.

=== Disputes ===
There are two disputes between the Joint Typhoon Warning Center, the best track data, and the post-season report concerning the hurricane. The first involved the peak intensity of the hurricane. The post-season report released by the Environmental Science Services Administration noted that the 85 mph (137 km/h) winds recorded by the unknown ship on September 1 were received two days after cool inflow, and gave the hurricane a peak intensity estimate of 115 mph (185 km/h) on August 30, making Liza a Category 3 hurricane and the most intense hurricane of the season. However, the JTWC and the best track data both gave peak intensities equivalent to the ship report on September 1. Liza was the first of three hurricanes of the season that was thought to have reached Category 3 strength. The other two were Pauline and Rebecca.

Another dispute exists concerning the track the hurricane took, specifically between the downgrade to tropical depression and dissipation. The best track and ESSA report both showed that Liza went southwestward through the time period. However, the JTWC final report on Liza reported that Liza made a tiny loop that was entirely within 24°N to 25°N latitude and 125°W to 126°W longitude from September 4 to September 6.

== Impact ==
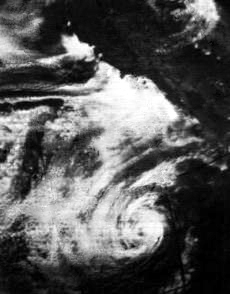
Hurricane Liza on September 2 during rapid weakening

Despite never making landfall, the United States Weather Bureau warned that Liza could cause damage in California due to 4-foot (1.2 m) to 6-foot (1.8 m) swells it generated merging with high tide, creating 5-foot (1.5 m) to 10-foot (3.0 m) breaker waves which they reported could sweep over jetties and breakwaters as well as cause riptides on beaches. Officials at Long Beach were keeping an eye on breakwater activity and Laguna Beach lifeguards were prepared in case the swells reported there grew. At Newport Beach, the Corps of Engineers were brought in to create a buffer with sand and rock to protect homes between 41st Street and 46th Street, and concern in West Newport Beach was that the hurricane would cause more damage to oceanfront homes that were weakened by swirling seas the previous week. The waves were expected to be the only cause of damage from the hurricane, which forecaster Emii Kurtz remarked was "much too far away" to affect atmospheric weather conditions.

From September 2 to September 3, large waves, some as high as 12-foot (3.7 m), impacted beaches throughout southern California, with Los Angeles and Orange Counties experiencing growing breakers, and Cabrillo Beach experiencing riptides for two days straight. Due to the Labor Day beach turnout, many reports of rescuing swimmers who were swept up by waves caused by the hurricane were received. On September 2, forty-seven swimmers in Zuma Beach had to be rescued despite warnings to stay out of deep water, and an additional 261 rescues were reported in Newport. More rescues were reported the next day. At the El Morro Beach Trailer Park near Laguna Beach, a group of sundecks estimated at $5,000 (1968 USD) were ripped from their supports by rough seas. Long Beach, in terms of damage, was particularly hit hard by Liza, with debris and sea foam from the heavy surf clogging storm drains. A group of tidal pools formed along an area of the beach, draining out from a parking lot on 72nd Street onto Ocean Boulevard, resulting in flooding that closed a section of the boulevard between 68th Place and 72nd Place to traffic. Various flower gardens were swamped by the flooding. The weakened properties in West Newport Beach also sustained no additional damage.

== See also ==
- List of Pacific hurricanes
- Other storms with the same name
