= 1968 Pacific hurricane season =

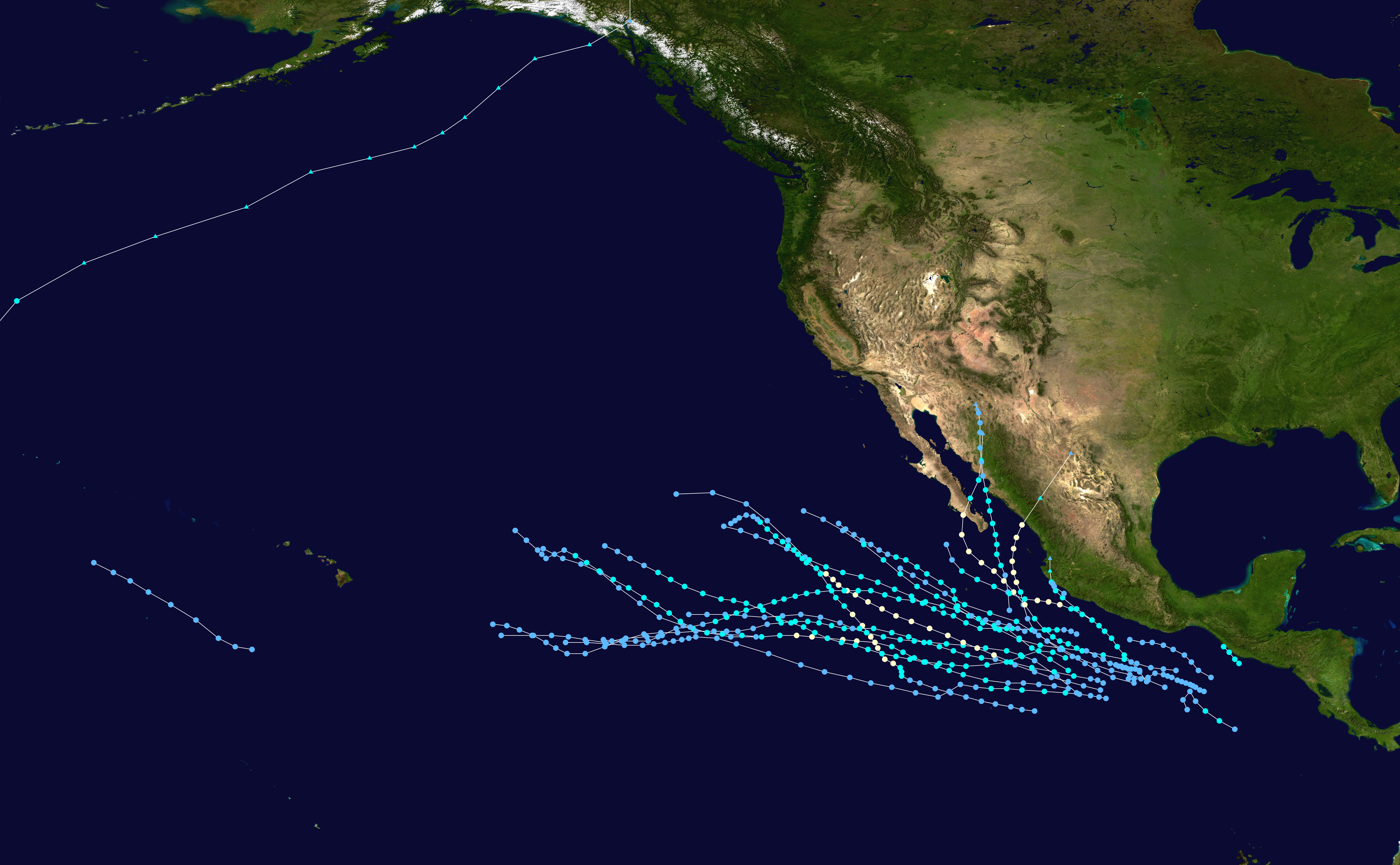
- Season summary map

Seasonal boundaries
- First system formed: June 20, 1968
- Last system dissipated: October 28, 1968

Strongest storm
- Name: Rebecca
  - Maximum winds: 85 mph (140 km/h) (1-minute sustained)
  - Lowest pressure: 965 mbar (hPa; 28.5 inHg)

Seasonal statistics
- Total depressions: 26
- Total storms: 20
- Hurricanes: 6
- Total fatalities: 9 direct
- Total damage: Unknown

Related articles
- 1968 Atlantic hurricane season; 1968 Pacific typhoon season; 1968 North Indian Ocean cyclone season

The 1968 Pacific hurricane season tied the record for the most active August in terms of tropical storms. It officially started on May 15, 1968, in the eastern Pacific and June 1 in the central Pacific and lasted until November 30, 1968. These dates conventionally delimit the period of each year when most tropical cyclones form in the northeastern Pacific Ocean.

Several notable systems formed during the season. Five named storms—Hyacinth, Iva, Liza, Naomi, and Pauline—had effects in the United States. Two others—Annette and Tropical Depression Two—affected Mexico, and Tropical Storm Simone made a rare landfall on Guatemala. Tropical Storm Virginia, which formed in the West Pacific, crossed into the basin at a high latitude.

== Season summary ==
Twenty-five tropical cyclones formed this season, resulting in 501 advisories being issued in the Eastern Pacific (east of 140°W), and 30 being issued for the Central Pacific (between 140°W and the International Date Line), both records at the time. Of these, six remained depressions, thirteen peaked as tropical storms, and six reached hurricane strength. There were no major hurricanes this season. Many of the tropical cyclones this season – including all six hurricanes – formed from Intertropical Convergence Zone (ITCZ) disturbances. Eight tropical storms formed in August this year, a record for the most active August in the East Pacific, excluding Virginia. The eight named storms forming in August this year also made it the most tropical storms to ever form in a month in the East Pacific since 1966. However, this record was tied during the 2009 Pacific hurricane season. Because of a lack of Hurricane Hunter data, a majority of the intensity readings from this season were later removed from the best track file. Only one pressure reading from this season – a 1,008 millibars (29.8 inHg) reading taken from Hurricane Pauline on October 29 when it was a tropical depression – was left on the best track data, although a pressure of 1,005 millibars (29.7 inHg) taken from Tropical Storm Simone was used to set its peak intensity.

== Systems ==
=== Tropical Storm Annette ===
- Tropical storm (SSHWS)
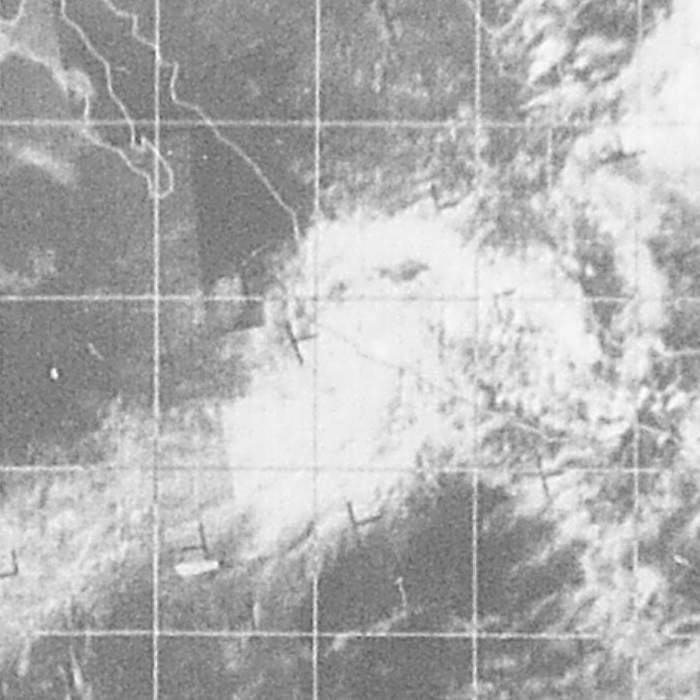
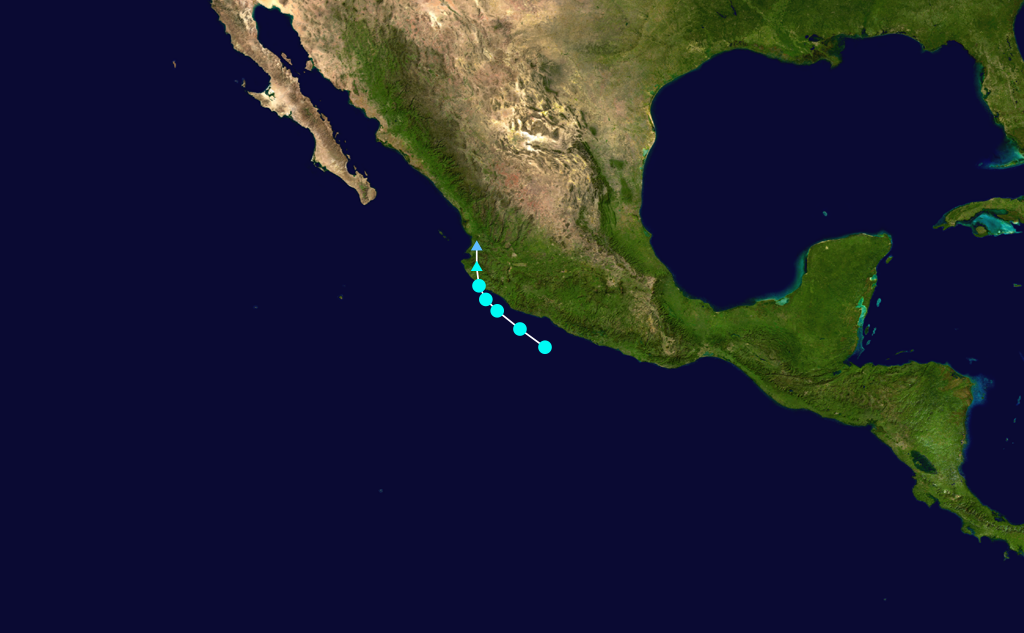
- Duration: June 20 – June 22
- Peak intensity: 50 mph (85 km/h) (1-min); 1003 mbar (hPa)

Even though the James Lykes noted that an area of disturbed weather south of the Pacific coast of Mexico was poorly organized, it reported south-southwest winds of 50 mph (80 km/h) on June 20. It made landfall and dissipated near Manzanillo on June 22. The satellite that was orbiting over Annette never took a picture with the storm in view since the storm was usually at the edge of the satellite. A computerized mosaic showed a spiral vortex with the center over land, which was unhelpful in tracking the storm because ship reports noted that the circulation was over water. Damage, if any, is not known.

=== Tropical Storm Bonny ===
- Tropical storm (SSHWS)
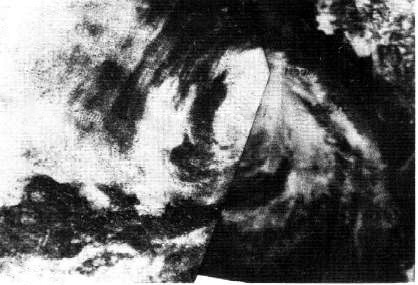
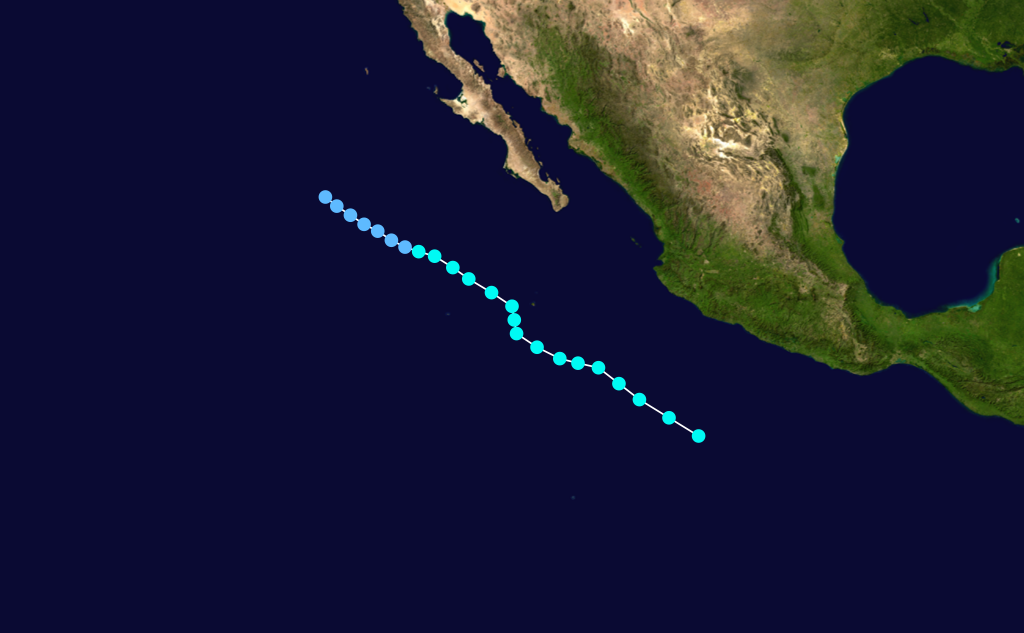
- Duration: July 4 – July 9
- Peak intensity: 50 mph (85 km/h) (1-min); 1001 mbar (hPa)

The first of a large group of tropical cyclones that developed from ITCZ disturbances this season, a low pressure center in the ITCZ rapidly developed late on July 3. Becoming a tropical storm on July 4, the storm received the name Bonny. The newly named storm tracked west-northwest for 24 hours before turning to the north overnight on July 5 into July 6. As a result, winds of 60 mph (97 km/h) were measured on Socorro Island, which was located 50 mi (80 km) to the east-northeast of the storm's center. At this time, satellites revealed that cooler sea surface temperatures and stratus inflow were starting to take their toll on Bonny. The storm began a slow dissipation and, by the time a nearby ship reported the status of the weakening storm, the system had already dropped to depression strength with 30 mph (48 km/h) winds. The storm dissipated on July 9. The remnant low of Bonny had no kinetic energy, causing the forecasters to note that it had a ragged appearance on satellite imagery.

=== Tropical Storm Celeste ===
- Tropical storm (SSHWS)
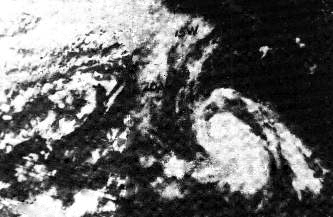
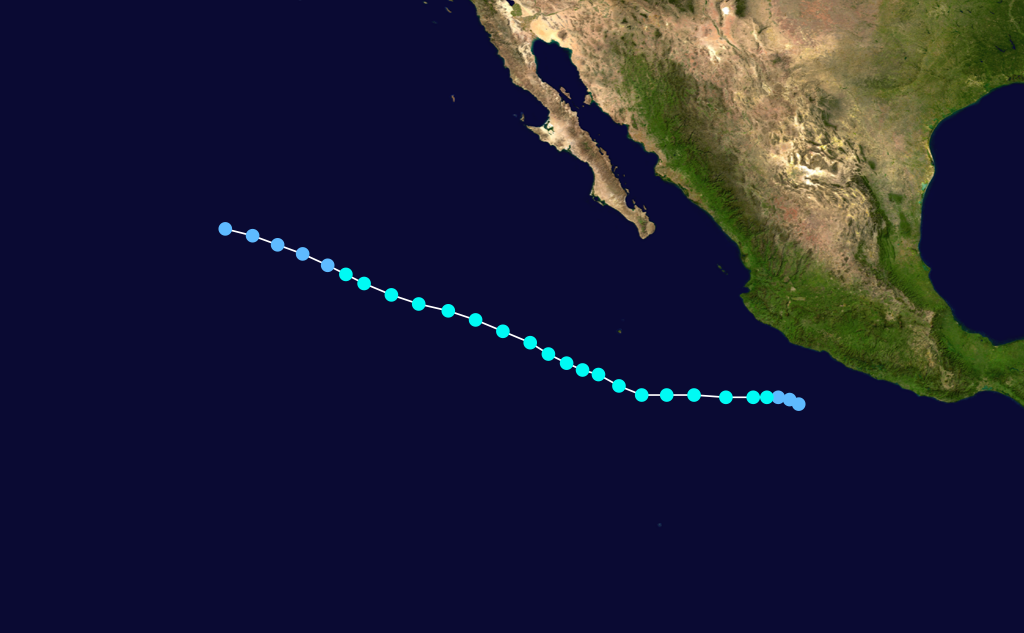
- Duration: July 15 – July 21
- Peak intensity: 50 mph (85 km/h) (1-min); 1003 mbar (hPa)

The disturbance that became Celeste was first noticed by the Eastern Pacific Hurricane Center on July 13. The disturbance slowly intensified, becoming a tropical depression on July 14 and reaching storm strength on the next day. The intensity when the system was named was 70 mph (110 km/h), but in post-season analysis the storm's peak wind speed was downgraded into 50 mph (80 km/h). This difference in intensity was blamed on brightness issues on the photo taken by satellite, making the storm look more powerful than it really was. The storm never strengthened past the 50 mph (80 km/h) peak it had reached when it became a storm. The storm would continue uneventfully until July 17, when stratus inflow was starting to become entrained in the atmospheric circulation and, shortly after peaking, the storm began to weaken after strong inflow of cool air to the northwest. The weakening Celeste became less discernible in recon reports, but the cloud vortex was still well defined. On July 20, the storm was downgraded into a depression and dissipated 24 hours afterward.

=== Tropical Storm Diana ===
- Tropical storm (SSHWS)
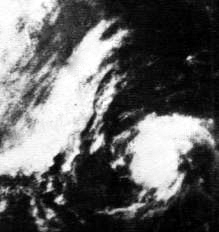
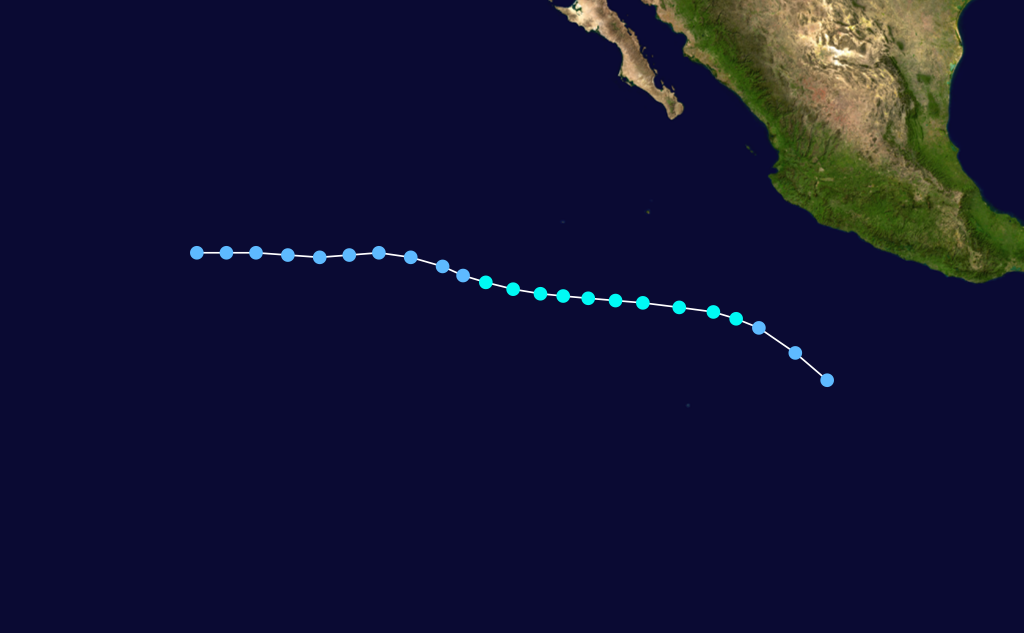
- Duration: July 21 – July 26
- Peak intensity: 50 mph (85 km/h) (1-min); 1000 mbar (hPa)

While Celeste was weakening, a tropical disturbance associated with the ITCZ first appeared on July 19. After Celeste lost its tropical identity on July 21, the former had strengthened enough to be upgraded to tropical storm strength and was given the name "Diana". The banding in the center of the upgraded system was obscured by heavy cirrus outflow. The initial intensity set was 60 mph (97 km/h). The Anco Swan, a ship north of Tropical Storm Diana, indicated that the tropical storm had reached its peak intensity around this time, which was maintained for two days. Then, cool inflow had become elongated in the storm, resulting in weakening. The storm degenerated into a depression on July 24 and continued moving westward. The depression finally dissipated on July 26, well away from land.

=== Tropical Storm Estelle ===
- Tropical storm (SSHWS)
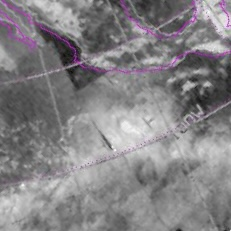
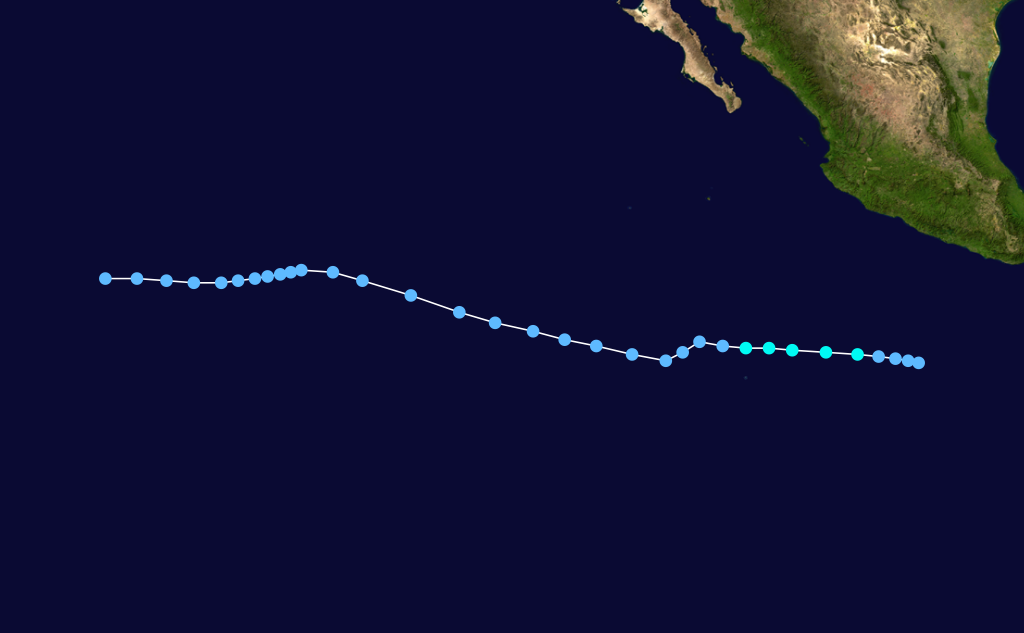
- Duration: July 23 – July 31
- Peak intensity: 50 mph (85 km/h) (1-min); 1008 mbar (hPa)

Estelle was a tropical storm that spent most of its life as a depression as a result of a southward shift in trade winds and the ITCZ, which provoked an early weakening and prevented re-intensification. The storm originated in a disturbance associated with the ITCZ. The disturbance had become a tropical depression on July 23 and reached storm strength the next day. The new tropical storm maintain a 50 mph (80 km/h) intensity for only 30 hours, when it weakened back to a depression. The weakened Estelle continued westward, passing into the Central Pacific around July 31. The group that oversaw the Central Pacific at the time – the Joint Hurricane Warning Center – issued the depression's final advisory on August 1. Tropical Storm Estelle was notable in that it had advisories issued on it in the Central Pacific despite never actually crossing into the area of responsibility. It dissipated at a longitude of 139.6°W, whereas the Central Pacific begins at 140°W. However, last operational advisory centered the storm at 141.6°W.

=== Hurricane Fernanda ===
- Category 1 hurricane (SSHWS)
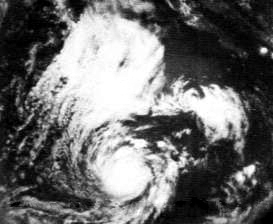
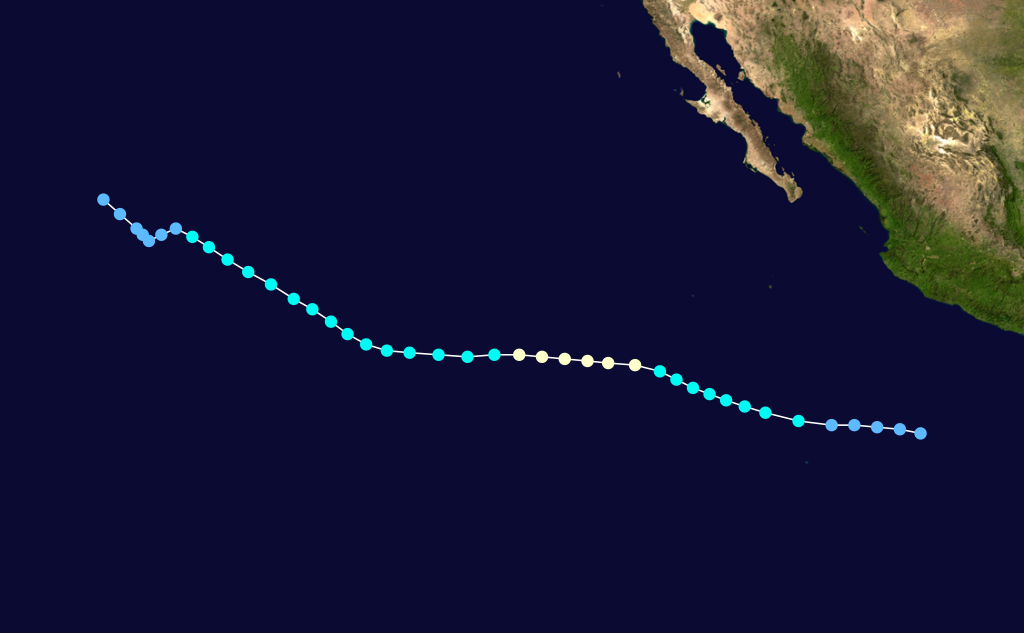
- Duration: August 5 – August 15
- Peak intensity: 85 mph (140 km/h) (1-min); 1000 mbar (hPa)

The trade winds that had resulted in the weakening of Estelle in late July had decreased in early August, allowing a weak disturbance in the ITCZ to organize near Acapulco. By August 5, the disturbance had developed a vortex and advisories were started on the newly formed depression. The depression would continue to strengthen and, after acquiring significant cirrus outflow, was upgraded to tropical storm intensity on August 6. Fernanda continued to develop, despite the proximity of Tropical Storm Gwen, which was 450 mi (720 km) to the east-northeast of the center. On August 8, the storm had developed an eye in a tightly wound spiral overcast and became a hurricane while moving westward. Cool inflow began to get trapped in the circulation, causing the hurricane to weaken to a storm on August 9, but due to the hurricane moving over warmer water, it was not enough to begin dissipation alone. The feeder bands, which helped the hurricane to reach its peak intensity, continued to persist over warm water until August 11, when the cirrus cap over Fernanda became uncoupled to the east, thus exposing the west side of the storm. Plane reports showed the hurricane had moved under westerly winds in the troposphere, which resulted in the storm weakening to a depression on August 13. Shower activity from the hurricane continued diminishing until August 14, and, early on August 15, Fernanda dissipated, having never affected land.

=== Tropical Storm Gwen ===
- Tropical storm (SSHWS)
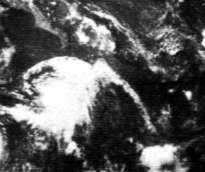
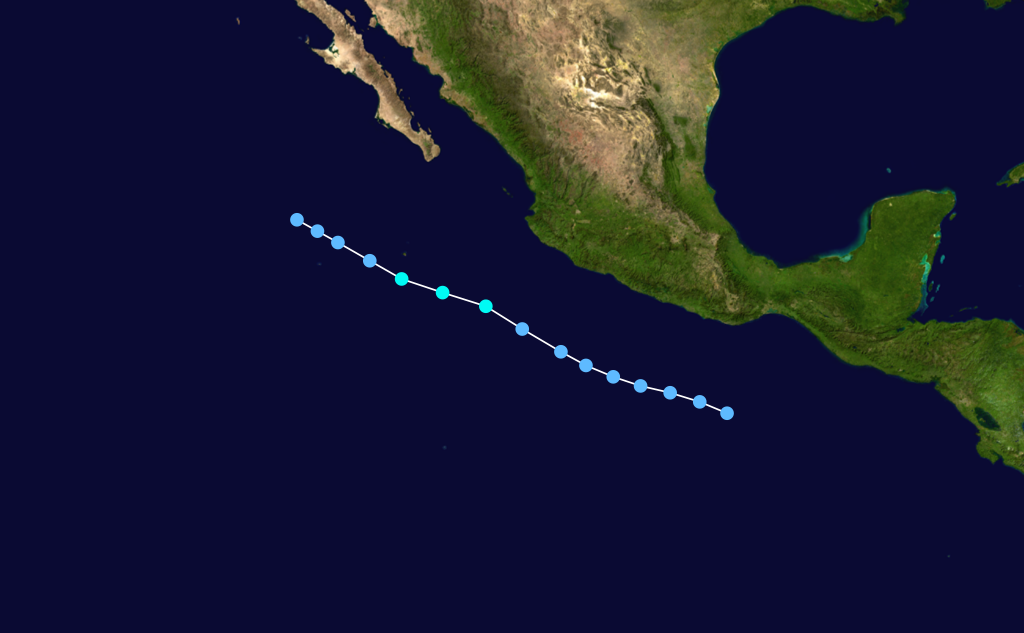
- Duration: August 5 – August 9
- Peak intensity: 50 mph (85 km/h) (1-min); 1010 mbar (hPa)

The ITCZ-based depression which developed into Gwen was first noted on August 5 while 250 mi (400 km) south of Tehuantepec. Although a ship in the region reported 40 mph (65 km/h) winds and 14-foot (4.3 m) waves, a satellite picture revealed a cloud mass of amorphous quality. Although a little vortex in the region was visible, the system would show little development for 48 hours until, on August 7, stronger rotation and outflow were apparent in satellite imagery. The next day, a ship north of the center reported 13-foot (4.0 m) waves and 35 mph (55 km/h) winds. Data based on satellite images, and the ship report, were enough to upgrade the system to Tropical Storm Gwen. Around this time, the track of the newly named system was being affected by the stronger Fernanda to its west via Fujiwhara effect. Shortly thereafter, satellite photos showed an exposed atmospheric circulation in the northwest section of the storm with cloud cover lagging behind it, and the storm was downgraded to a depression on August 8. The circulation was completely exposed by the next day, and Gwen dissipated. The remnants of Gwen continued to interact with Fernanda until complete dissipation.

=== Tropical Storm Hyacinth ===
- Tropical storm (SSHWS)
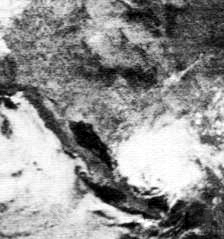
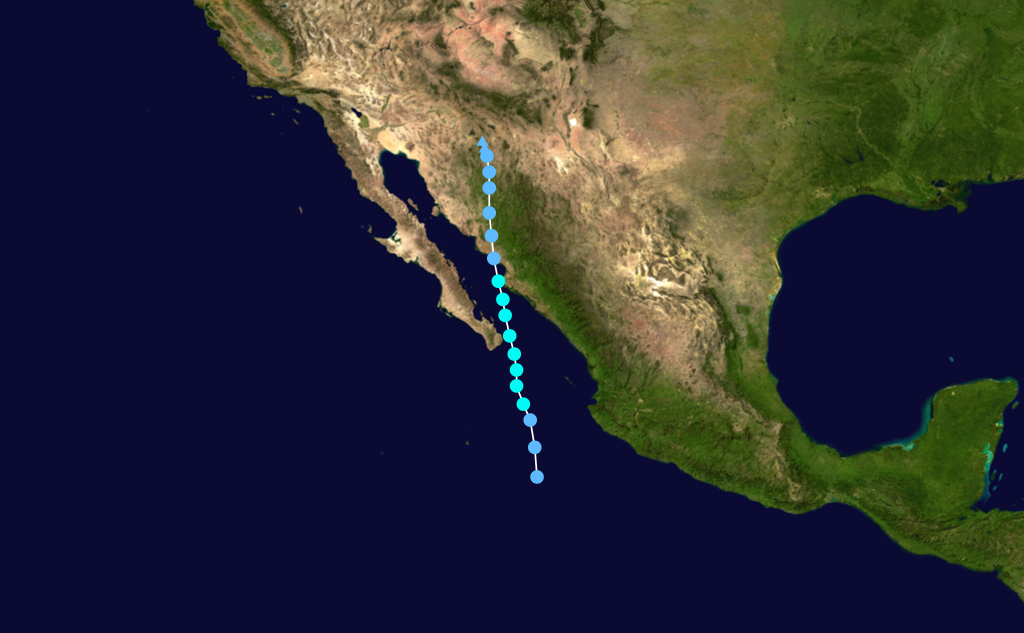
- Duration: August 17 – August 21
- Peak intensity: 65 mph (100 km/h) (1-min); 994 mbar (hPa)

The origins of Hyacinth were linked to a cold front that was over Texas on August 11. There was no activity associated with the disturbance until August 16, when a circular overcast broke away from the front. The overcast breaking away was related to a newly formed low, which moved north-northwest while rapidly intensifying, becoming a tropical storm on August 17. Hyacinth continued to move north-northwestward, entering the mouth of the Gulf of California later that day, and a ship reported a barometric pressure of 994 millibars (29.4 inHg). Another ship report, showing winds of 65 mph (105 km/h), was received at the same time. The storm passed 60 mi (95 km) east of La Paz, Baja California Sur, on August 18, and the next day, it made landfall near Los Mochis, Sinaloa. The clouds associated with the storm were tracked into the southwestern United States, causing showers and thunderstorms over Arizona, New Mexico, and Colorado on August 20. The storm dissipated on August 21. No deaths were reported in connection to Hyacinth, and damage from Mexico is unknown.

=== Tropical Storm Iva ===
- Tropical storm (SSHWS)
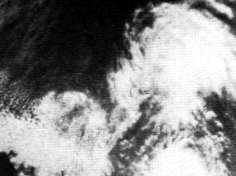
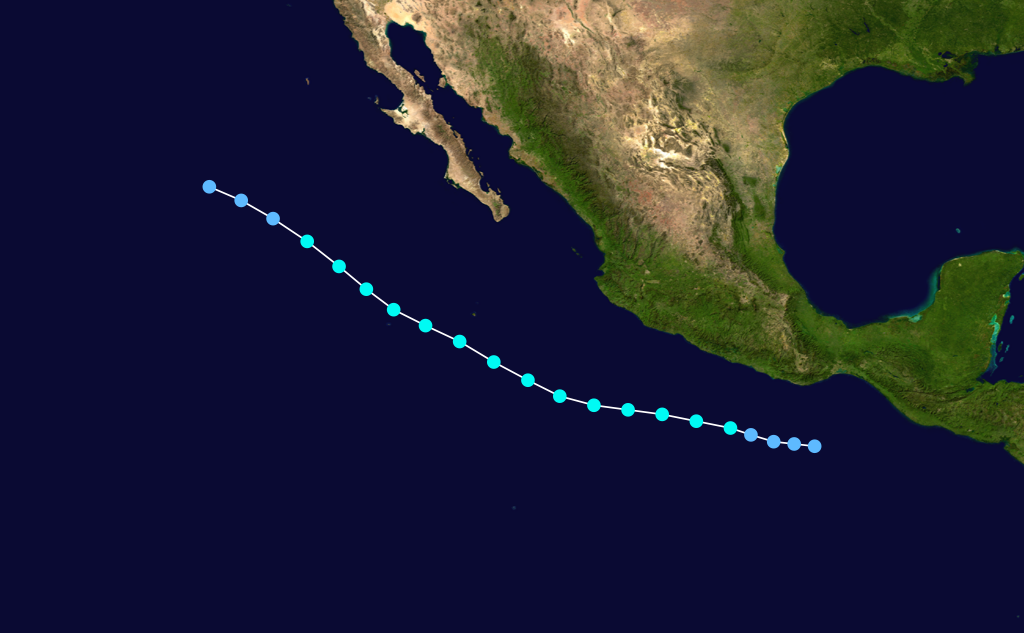
- Duration: August 21 – August 26
- Peak intensity: 50 mph (85 km/h) (1-min); 996 mbar (hPa)

While the moisture and clouds associated with Hyacinth moved northward, an area of rain-producing clouds along the ITCZ stretched from the Gulf of Tehuantepec to Clipperton Island. On August 20, two disturbances formed southwest of Mexico, the first was found via satellite imagery and the second was found by ship report. The disturbance further west developed into Tropical Storm Iva while the other disturbance ultimately became Hurricane Joanne. Ship reports on August 21 led to the disturbance to be upgraded into a tropical storm. However, in best track data, Iva was at depression strength throughout this date, becoming a tropical storm on August 22. Winds of up to 35 mph (55 km/h) were recorded north of the center, which had shifted to 13.5°N, 98.5°W. Despite the winds, a satellite photo of the storm showed poor organization. The storm intensified slowly while moving west-northwest at 14 mph (23 km/h) for the next 48 hours. On August 24, the storm passed 75 mi (121 km) south of Socorro Island, which reported winds of 45 mph (70 km/h). By this time, the storm was moving northwestward at 21 mph (34 km/h) due to the influence of strengthening Hurricane Joanne. Later on August 24, a picture of Iva and Joanne showed that the cirrus cap over Iva was becoming separated from the circulation. The storm began weakening afterward, weakening to a depression on August 25 after moving over cool sea surface temperatures. The rain clouds associated with the weakening depression moved westward, producing rains for 12 hours until the storm dissipated early on August 26.

Despite never making landfall while active, Iva was responsible for driving clouds and moisture inland, causing slight showers on August 26 in the area of Yuma, Arizona, which was 720 mi (1,160 km) away for the center of the storm. After slight rainfall in the morning, a 30% chance of precipitation and the possibility of thunderstorms linked to the remnants was predicted for the rest of the day.

=== Hurricane Joanne ===
- Category 1 hurricane (SSHWS)
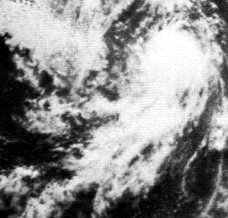
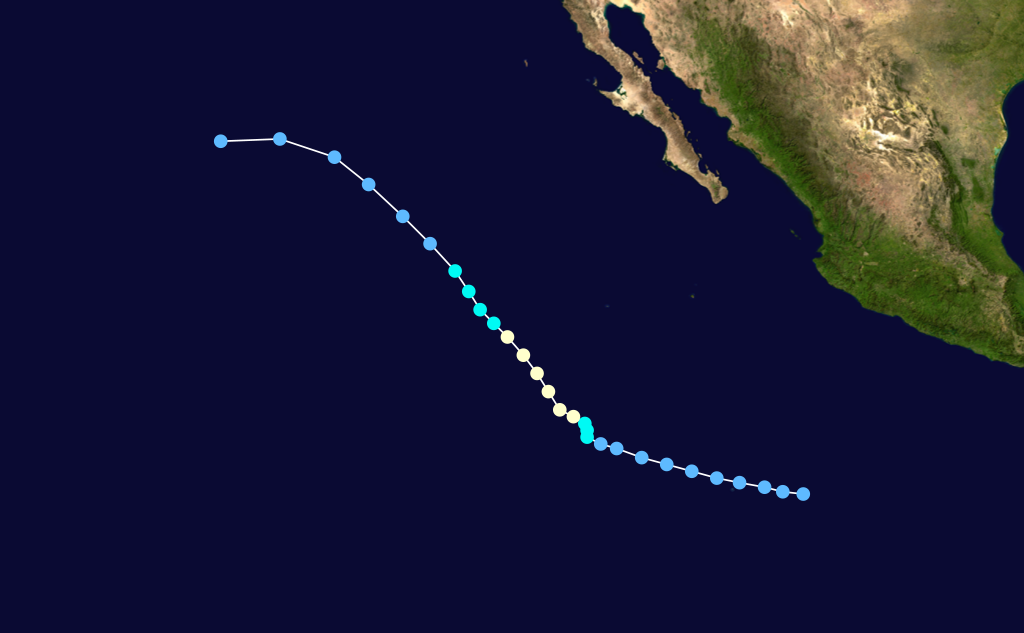
- Duration: August 21 – August 28
- Peak intensity: 85 mph (140 km/h) (1-min); 986 mbar (hPa)

The other disturbance associated with the ITCZ that also formed Iva, 777 mi (1,250 km) south of Cabo San Lucas had a central pressure of 1,007 millibars (29.7 inHg) reported by a ship passing through the center along with calm winds on August 23, with the depression becoming a tropical storm later that day. 18 hours after the report, the cyclone began rapid intensification, with hurricane-force winds being reported before the end of the day, along with another report of a central pressure of 986 millibars (29.1 inHg), but the storm did not officially reach hurricane strength until August 24. Around this time, the intensification of Joanne became a factor in the northwestward acceleration of Iva. On August 25, the hurricane had weakened to a storm, but on August 26, the storm was thought to have begun to re-intensify due to the presence of an eye on satellite, but a ship nearby reported winds of only 25 mph (40 km/h) and 1,008 millibars (29.8 inHg). The storm weakened to a depression later that day, and ultimately dissipated on August 28, its remains being absorbed into the trade winds.

=== Tropical Storm Kathleen ===
- Tropical storm (SSHWS)
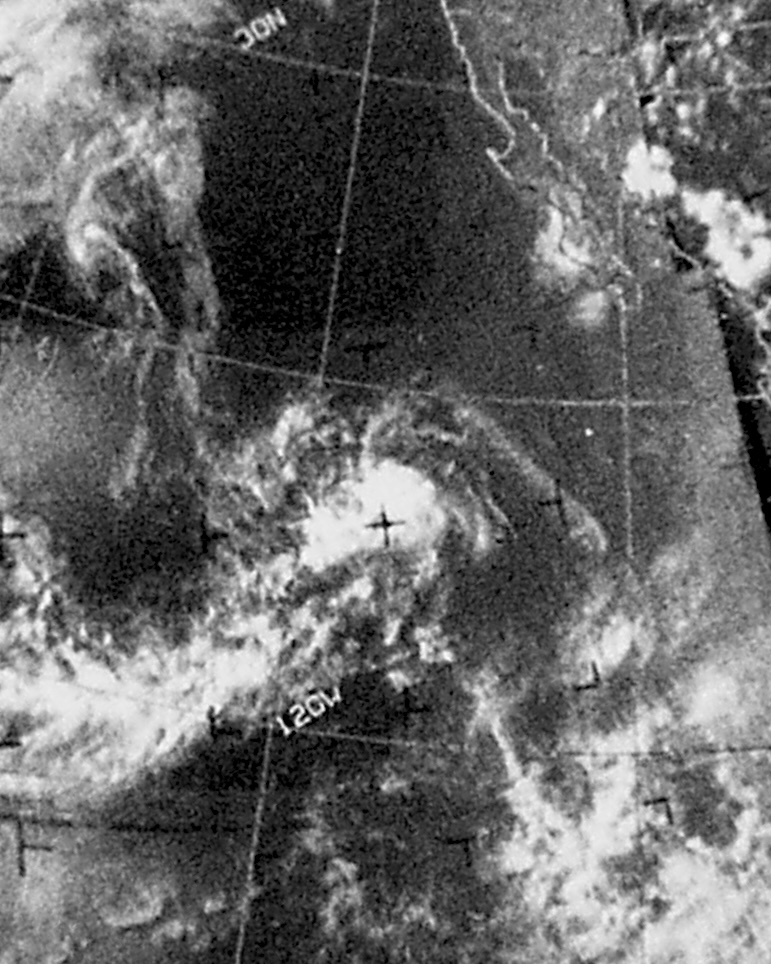
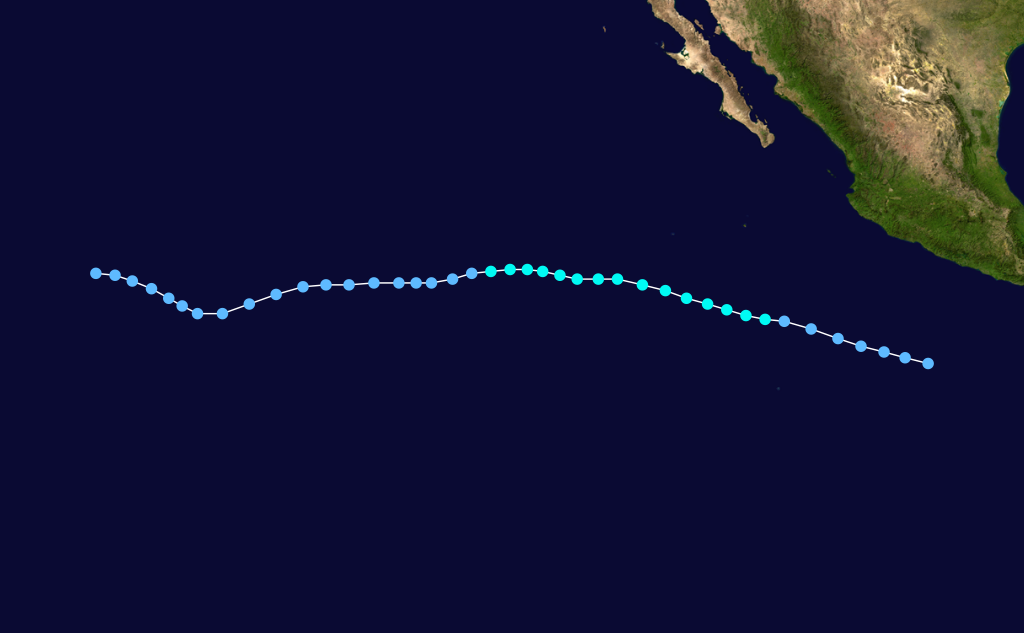
- Duration: August 24 – September 3
- Peak intensity: 50 mph (85 km/h) (1-min); 1003 mbar (hPa)

Kathleen developed from an ITCZ disturbance that was first noticed on August 23 while 400 mi (640 km) south of the Gulf of Tehuantepec. The disturbance moved to the west-northwest at 15 mph (24 km/h). A lack of surface information prevented Hurricane Hunter investigation into the system until August 25, when the disturbance developed into Tropical Storm Kathleen. Reports of heavy rains and winds of 35 mph (55 km/h) were reported by ships 75 mi (120 km) from the center of the storm at this time. Afterward, the storm moved westward, with verification of the intensity of the storm coming from the ship Denby Grange on August 28, which reported eastward winds of 45 mph (70 km/h) and a central pressure of 1,003 millibars (29.6 inHg) while north of the center. The storm continued to move westward, weakening to a tropical depression on August 29. The depression continued, moving into the Central Pacific late on September 1, ultimately dissipating on September 3. Even though it was a long-lived storm, Tropical Storm Kathleen had little organization. Satellite pictures taken of the storm never showed more than a slight vortex.

=== Tropical Storm Virginia ===
- Tropical storm (SSHWS)
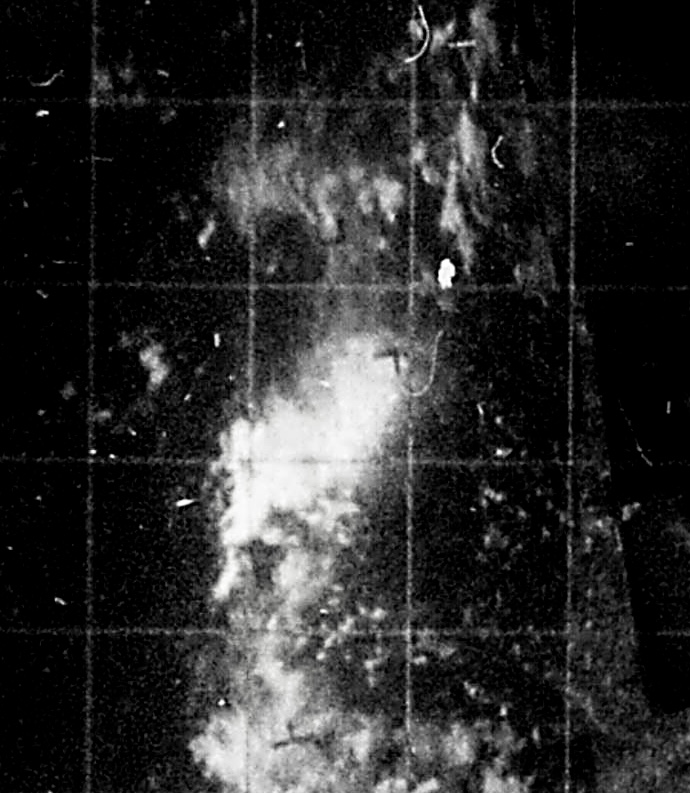
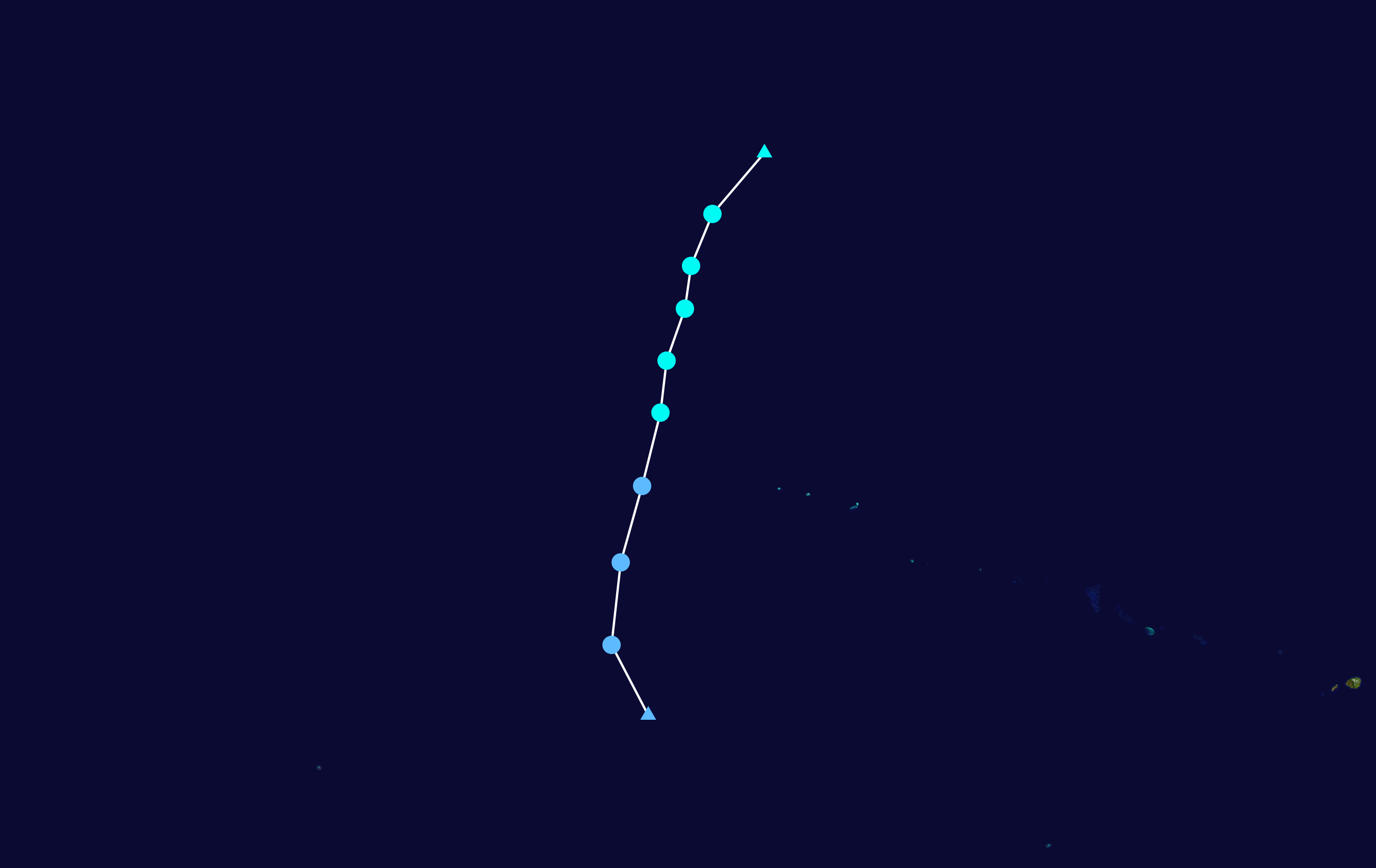
- Duration: August 26 (entered basin) – August 27
- Peak intensity: 65 mph (100 km/h) (1-min); 990 mbar (hPa)

The only tropical storm this season to form in the West Pacific and move into the basin, it was first noticed on August 24, At this time, the tropical cyclone was located 350 mi (560 km) northwest of Midway Atoll, just west of the International Date Line. It was upgraded to tropical storm status that same day, becoming the 11th storm of the typhoon season. After a brief flare in intensity, the storm crossed the Date Line while generating sustained winds of 60 mph (95 km/h). Within 24 hours after crossing, however, cold air entered the circulation, causing Virginia to be declared extratropical cyclone on August 25 at 38°N Shortly before becoming doing so, it was estimated on best track that Virginia reached a minimum pressure of 990 millibars (29 inHg) Moving towards the northeast, a ship called the Lica Maersk reported 45 mph (72 km/h) winds. Two more ship reports after the transition gave reported winds of 65 miles per hour (105 km/h) on August 26 and 42 mph (68 km/h) on August 28, while the extratropical cyclone was over the Gulf of Alaska. The extratropical remnants of Virginia finally dissipated while in the Gulf of Alaska at an unprecedented latitude of 52°N, which only one other storm has ever approached.

Virginia formed at an unusually high latitude, first becoming tropical at 31°N and crossing into the Central Pacific at 35°N. Few tropical cyclones have ever reached such latitudes and only one named cyclone – Typhoon Sarah from the previous year – had ever done it. At that time, Tropical Storm Virginia held the record for the northernmost tropical storm formation in the Pacific basin.

=== Hurricane Liza ===
- Category 1 hurricane (SSHWS)
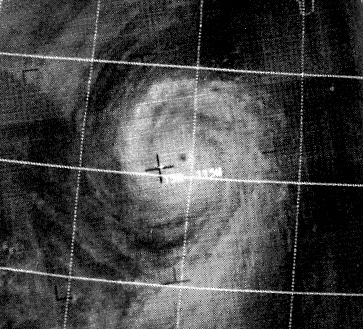
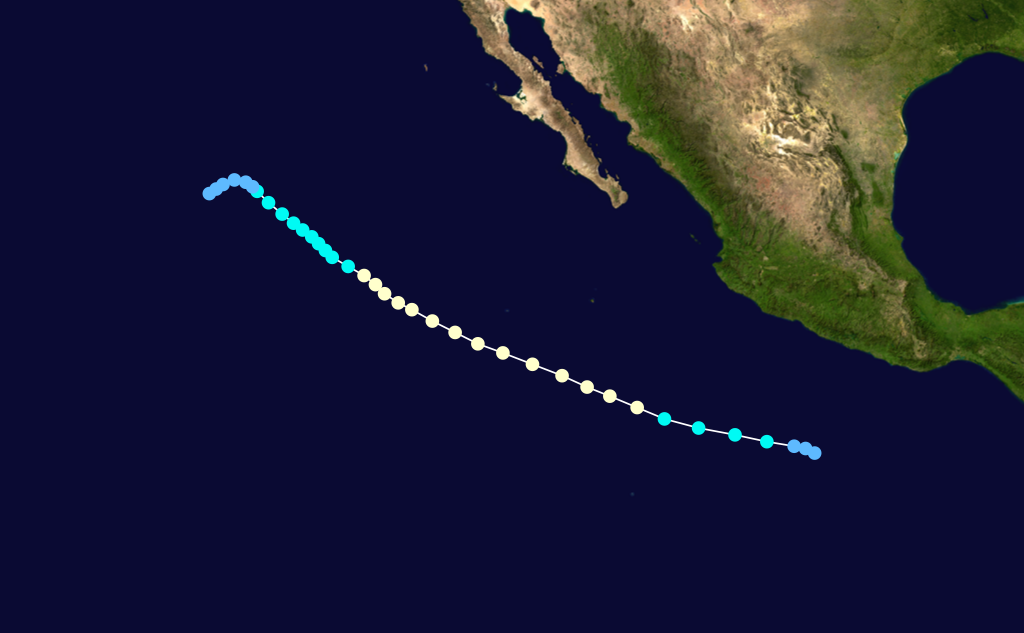
- Duration: August 28 – September 6
- Peak intensity: 85 mph (140 km/h) (1-min); 998 mbar (hPa)

Hurricane Liza was a rapidly forming hurricane with an uncertain peak intensity. Forming suddenly from an area of the ITCZ on August 28, the hurricane quickly strengthened to reach a peak of 85 mph (135 km/h) on August 30, though there is a possibility that the hurricane topped out as a Category 3 hurricane with winds of 115 mph (185 km/h). After reaching its peak, cool inflow caused the hurricane to begin to weaken. The hurricane was downgraded into a storm on September 2, despite a presentation that an observer remarked could mean that Liza was not even that strong. The hurricane continued to weaken, being downgraded into a tropical depression on September 4 and dissipating on September 6.

Liza was responsible for causing slight flooding in Long Beach, California, and clogging storm drains. Various Labor Day swimmers were also swept up by waves triggered by Liza. A total of 261 swimmers were reported swept in Newport Beach and 47 in Zuma Beach; all of which were rescued. Near Laguna Beach, three sundecks worth $5,000 (1968 US$) were ripped from their supports by the surf.

=== Tropical Storm Madeline ===
- Tropical storm (SSHWS)
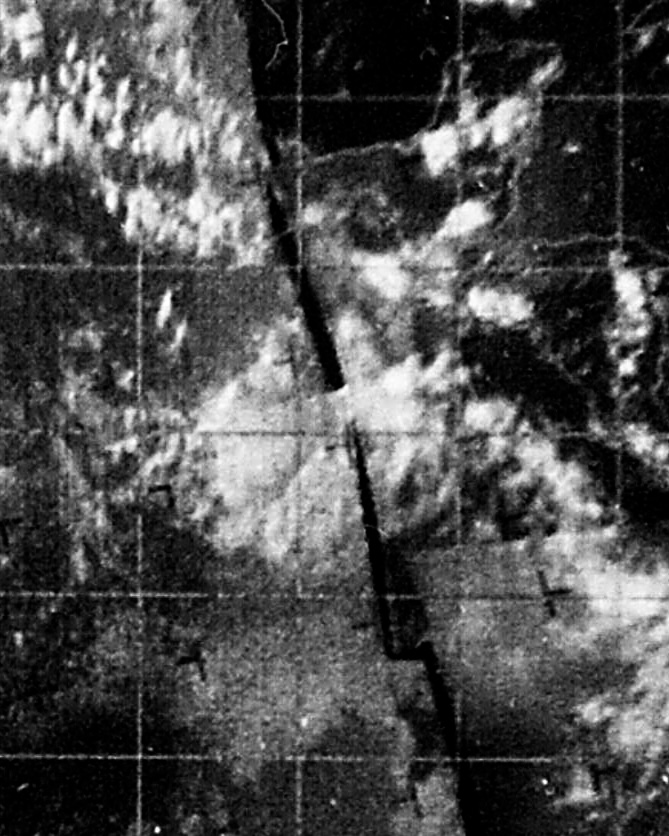
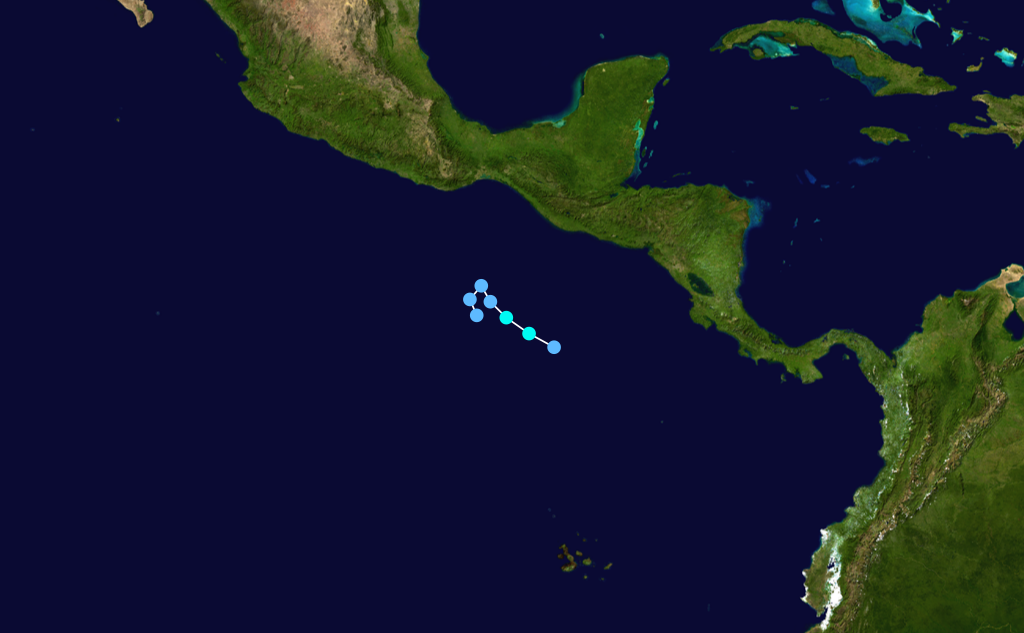
- Duration: August 29 – August 30
- Peak intensity: 50 mph (85 km/h) (1-min); 1009 mbar (hPa)

On August 28, satellite pictures picked up a central dense overcast spanning a distance of 140 mi (230 km) while located 800 mi (1,300 km) to the east-southeast of the newly upgraded Tropical Storm Liza. The cloud mass grew in size, but was still disorganized when it was photographed on August 29, and a ship nearby reported calm winds, wind waves were so not distinct that no direction of origin could be determined, and a swell of 1 ft (0.30 m) from an undetermined direction. The best track would eventually show that the system was a depression around this time. The same ship would later report a wind speed of 50 mph (80 km/h) from the north-northwest and a pressure estimate of 1,009 millibars (29.8 inHg) was determined via satellite, leading to the system to be upgraded to storm strength. The next day, the cloud mass associated with Madeline was beginning to become less organized; the storm dissipated later on August 30. The only direct evidence to support the tropical storm status of the system was a 50 mph (80 km/h) ship report. It is unknown whether or not the report of tropical storm-force winds was a gust or a sustained wind.

=== Hurricane Naomi ===
- Category 1 hurricane (SSHWS)
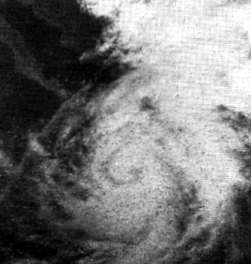
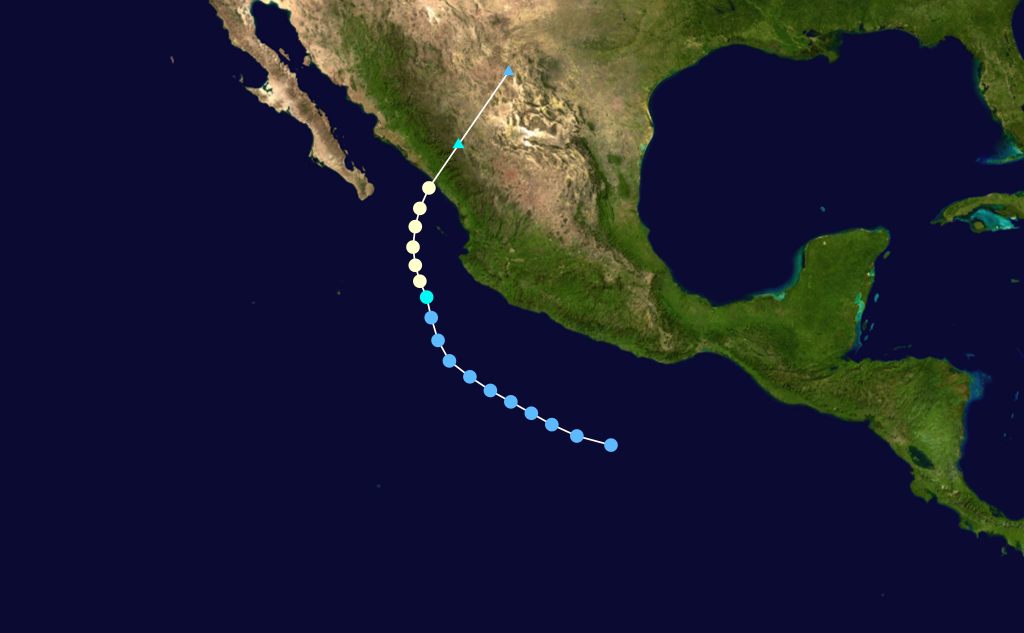
- Duration: September 9 – September 13
- Peak intensity: 85 mph (140 km/h) (1-min); 979 mbar (hPa)

Forming from a disturbance in the ITCZ on September 9, the storm rapidly intensified, becoming a hurricane shortly after being upgraded into a tropical storm. The hurricane eventually made a turn to the northeast, which took it to a landfall on Sinaloa near the town of Punta Piaxtla. There were four Sinaloan casualties from the hurricane, and a worker in Texas was injured when the roof of a plant they were working at collapsed from accumulated rainfall due to the interaction between Naomi and a frontal system over the Gulf Coast. The hurricane also was responsible for a panic involving the Lázaro Cardenás Dam, which was unfinished when the hurricane struck. Due in large part to the help of Automatic Picture Transmission technology, two towns downriver from the dam were saved when it was kept closed. A total of $16 million (1968 USD) in damages was reported from the hurricane in Sinaloa.

=== Tropical Storm Orla ===
- Tropical storm (SSHWS)
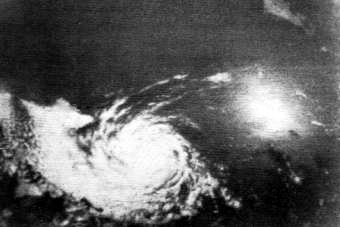
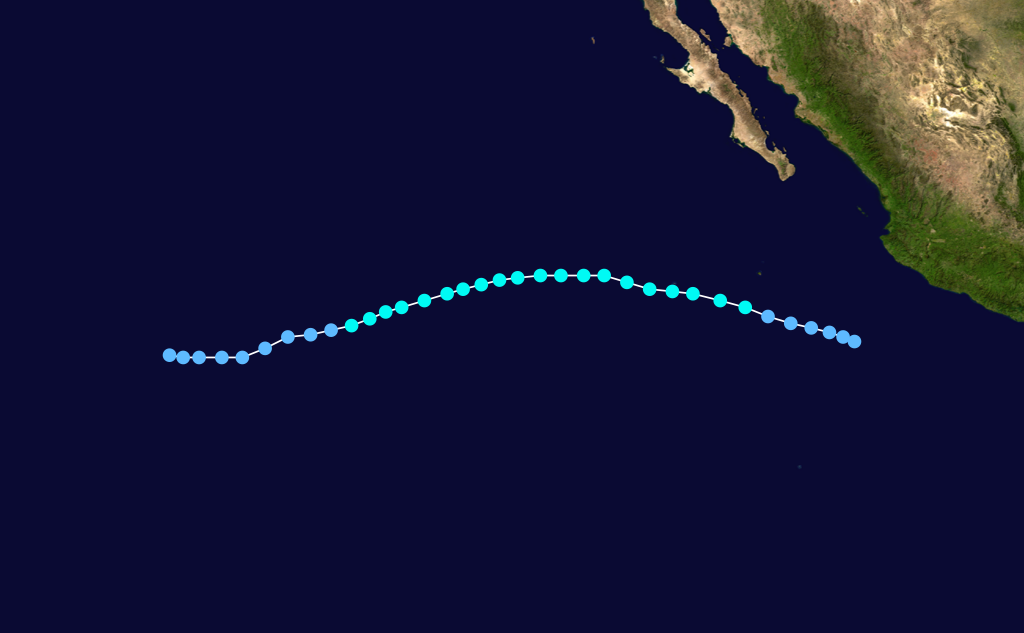
- Duration: September 22 – September 30
- Peak intensity: 60 mph (95 km/h) (1-min); 1007 mbar (hPa)

On September 21, satellite photography showed a cloud mass 150 mi (240 km) in diameter and ship reports the next day showed a weak circulation that was producing showers, and there was uncertainty in the location of the atmospheric circulation. Four hours later, it was found that external banding associated with the disturbance had increased and that its size had grown to 175 mi (280 km), but any information on internal banding was unavailable, due to obscuring cirrus. On September 23, the disturbance was 125 mi (200 km) southeast of Socorro Island, which reported a pressure drop of 5 mbar in 3 hours, which served as the basis for upgrading the disturbance to a tropical depression. Other information from Socorro included calm winds, low clouds, and a pressure of 1,008 millibars (29.8 inHg). Despite advisories on the depression starting on September 23, best track data showed that the disturbance had been a depression for the duration of the previous day. Later that day, the depression strengthened to a tropical storm with winds of 60 mph (95 km/h). Three hours after first being named, Orla began showing signs of an eye, and winds were operationally upgraded to 70 mph (110 km/h), though it was later found out that it never strengthened past 60 mph (95 km/h). At this time, the area around the tropical storm was mostly clear due to a dry flow off of the mainland. A ship called the Sapporo Maru passed 75 mi (121 km) north of the center reported swells of 9.5-foot (2.9 m), but winds of only 25 mph (40 km/h).

By September 25, the eye and some of the external banding had disappeared. The storm then proceeded to shrink both in size and in intensity due to stable inflow, and an eye became apparent for the second time. Satellite images of the storm were the basis for the possibility that Orla was maintaining stability due to low-pressure baroclinical processes, an unusual characteristic due to the fact that such conditions are common in extratropical cyclones as opposed to tropical cyclones, which Orla was. By September 27, weakening had begun, and the tropical storm was downgraded to a depression on September 28 and a spiral cloud mass continued to be evident on satellite pictures until September 30, when the depression dissipated.

=== Hurricane Pauline ===
- Category 1 hurricane (SSHWS)
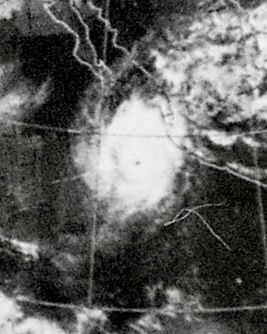
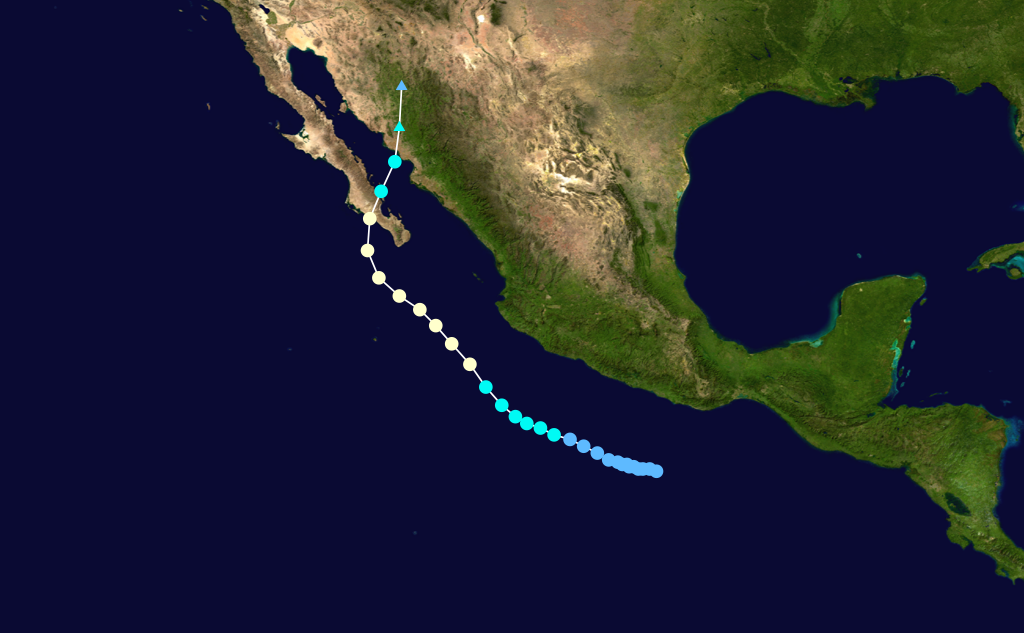
- Duration: September 26 – October 3
- Peak intensity: 85 mph (140 km/h) (1-min); 1002 mbar (hPa)

Forming from an ITCZ, the initial disturbance was tracked for 24 hours, after which it was upgraded to a tropical depression on September 28, although post-analysis revealed the cyclone was a depression since September 26. A vortex developed in the center, helping the cyclone to intensify into a tropical storm on September 29 and the next day, it was upgraded to a hurricane. Pauline underwent an eyewall replacement cycle on October 1 to October 2 before making landfall on Ciudad Constitutión. The hurricane moved back over water, but lost tropical characteristics prior to a second landfall near Navojoa. Total damage is unknown from the hurricane, but a boat with five occupants was reported missing during the passage of the hurricane over Magdalena Bay. The occupants were never found, and were reported dead as a result. The remnants caused a tornado that touched down near Glendale, injuring three people due to flying glass, and causing severe damage to two apartment buildings.

=== Hurricane Rebecca ===
- Category 1 hurricane (SSHWS)
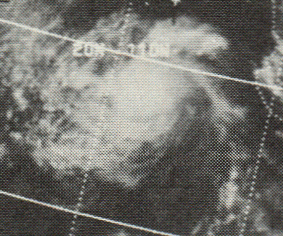
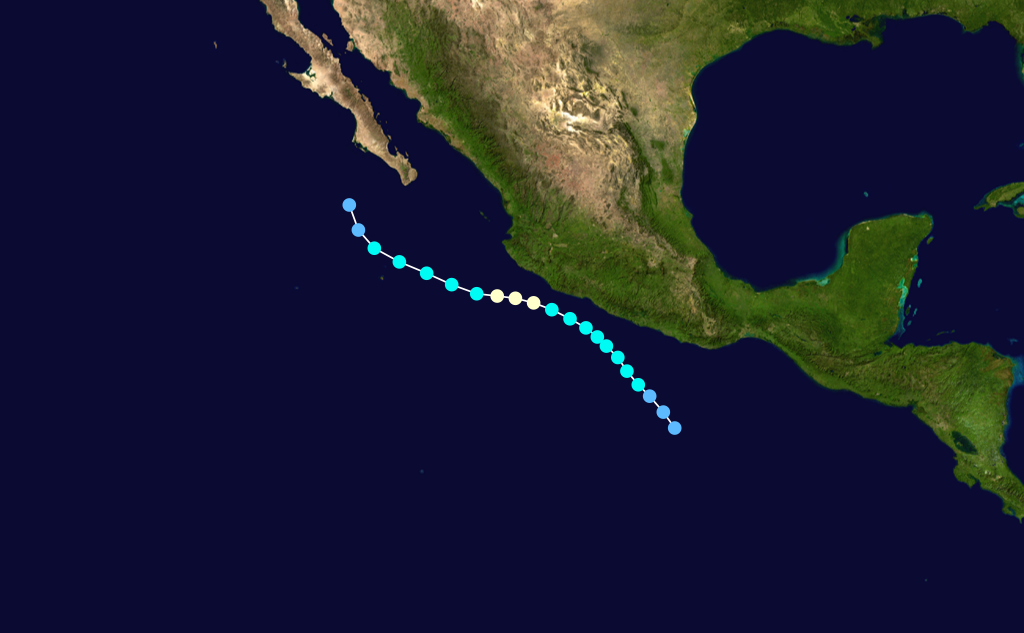
- Duration: October 6 – October 11
- Peak intensity: 85 mph (140 km/h) (1-min); 965 mbar (hPa)

The initial circulation developed in the ITCZ 500 mi (800 km) south of the Gulf of Tehuantepec. A low organized along the area on October 4, but intensification did not begin in full effect until the night of October 5. On October 6, the cyclone had organized enough to be considered a tropical depression and was upgraded to a tropical storm later that day. The storm continued to intensify, causing ships to avoid the storm despite its location over heavy shipping lanes. Due lack of shipping reports on October 7 and October 8 led to the idea that the storm had made landfall. The error was revealed when a ship passing nearby reported that the storm had attained hurricane status, and a second ship gave a report that the hurricane had strengthened to a high-end Category 2 on the Saffir–Simpson hurricane scale with a peak intensity estimate of Category 3 strength, making Rebecca the third hurricane of the season that possibly reached such an intensity. However, the official peak in the best track file is 85 mph (135 km/h). After reaching its peak, the hurricane moved westward until October 9, when a satellite picture gave a hint of the rapid decay the hurricane was about to face. The hurricane began to weaken, and by the time the cyclone neared Socorro Island late on October 9, it had weakened to a tropical storm. The island reported a pressure of 1,010 millibars (30 inHg) and calm winds, while the weakening storm was 80 mi (130 km) north-northwest of the island. The storm weakened to a depression on October 10 and dissipated on October 11. No damages or casualties were reported from the hurricane.

Rebecca was a small hurricane that approached within 75 mi (121 km) of the Mexican coastline. Due to its formation and movement along heavy shipping lines, ships were forced to take detours to avoid running into the hurricane. The hurricane never actually reached land, though at one point a forecast for the hurricane gave the possibility for it to make a landfall on Baja California Peninsula as a tropical depression. At the time, Rebecca drew comparisons to Hurricane Daisy of 1958 and Hurricane King of 1950 due to its intensity and size.

=== Tropical Storm Simone ===
- Tropical storm (SSHWS)
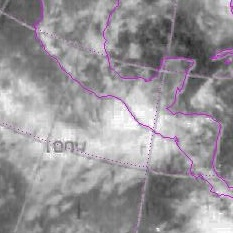
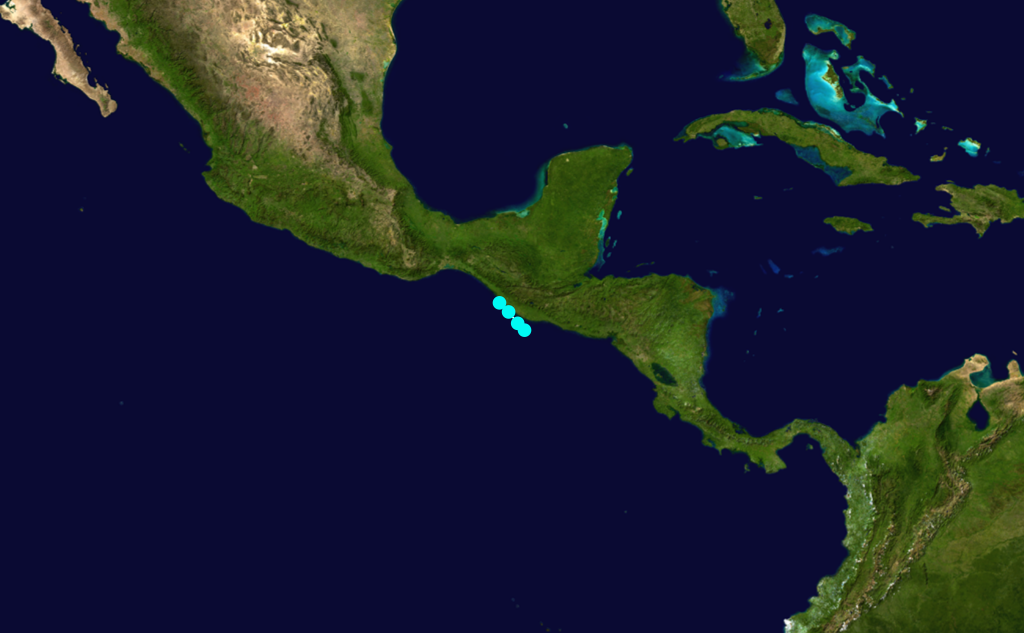
- Duration: October 18 – October 19
- Peak intensity: 50 mph (85 km/h) (1-min); 1005 mbar (hPa)

Simone was the last named cyclone this season to form from a disturbance in the ITCZ. A very short-lived storm, it rapidly formed from an area of squalls associated with the ITCZ close to the Guatemalan coast. Shortly after it formed, a ship called the Villanger reported winds of 45 mph (70 km/h) to 50 mph (80 km/h) along the northwest and southeast sections of a low center 30 mi (50 km/h) in diameter, leading to the cyclone to be called Simone. The storm moved towards the north and shortly thereafter, the previous low moved over land, likely due to the lack of a source of energy. However, another center formed back over water to the northwest of the previous one, prolonging the life of the storm. The new center caused the storm to shift towards Tapachula, Mexico and traveled along the coastline until dissipation. With a lifetime of only 24 hours, Simone was the shortest-lived tropical storm of 1968.

Although the system was originally missing from best track data, a revision proposed to National Hurricane Center caused the storm to be reinserted with a peak intensity of 50 mph (80 km/h) winds and a central pressure of 1,005 millibars (29.7 inHg). The reason the winds were set at 50 mph (80 km/h) was due to the high pressure of the storm, making it the most likely intensity equivalent, although some readings show that higher winds were reported from the storm. Another reason it was selected was due to it being used as a generic wind speed for tropical storms in the Pacific database.

=== Tropical Storm Tara ===
- Tropical storm (SSHWS)
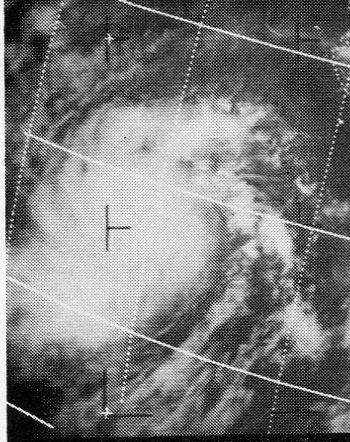
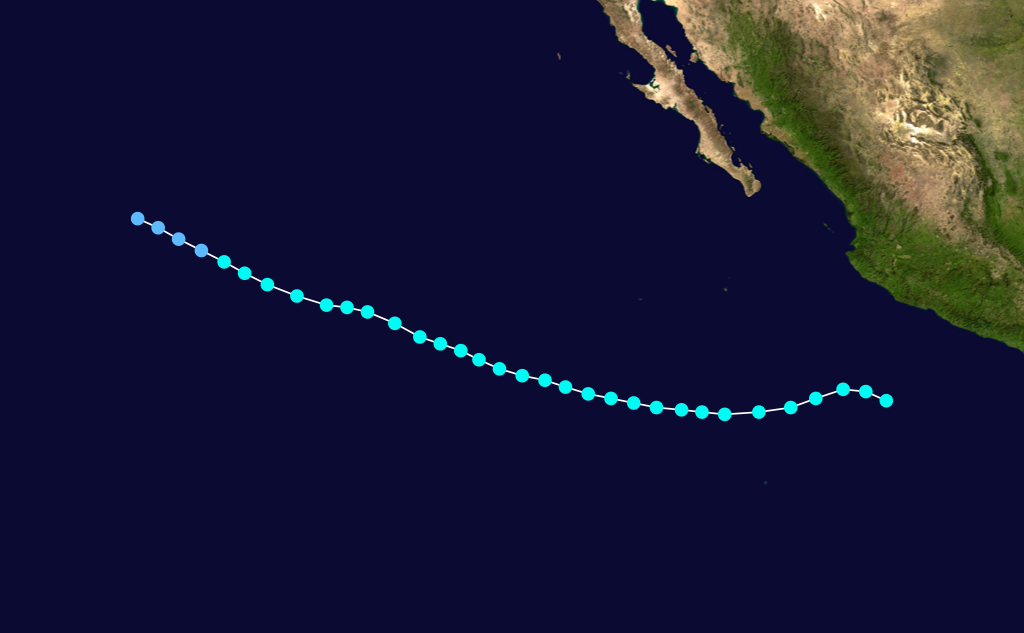
- Duration: October 20 – October 28
- Peak intensity: 50 mph (85 km/h) (1-min); 1006 mbar (hPa)

The final storm of the season developed from unknown origins, although there is a possibility that anticyclogenesis over Mexico that occurred after the dissipation of Simone may have played a part in the formation. When it was first noticed in satellite pictures on October 20 while 300 mi (480 km) southwest of Acapulco, it was estimated to have already been a tropical storm with 60 mph (95 km/h), a peak intensity that was later downgraded in best track data to 50 mph (80 km/h). The same picture also showed a compact central dense overcast, a large mass of deep convection, spanning three degrees of latitude, cirrus outflow, and loose banding features. For the next two days, the center of circulation of Tropical Storm Tara became better defined while slowly growing larger. The intensifying Tara moved to the west at 12 mph (19 km/h) to 14 mph (23 km/h) before turning to the west-northwest at 12 mph (19 km/h) on October 23. At the time of the west-northwest turn, satellite pictures picked up a separation of the cirrus cap, causing the storm to weaken. The system lasted as a weak tropical storm until October 27, when it was determined to have weakened to a depression, although the possibility exists that it had been a depression for days. The depression dissipated the next day.

=== Other systems ===
Tropical Depression Two was an unusual depression that developed on June 21 between Mexico and the active Annette. The depression came close to landfall shortly before dissipating on June 22, when Annette also dissipated. The cyclone formed and remained less than 70 mi (110 km) longitude from the more powerful tropical storm while in the proximity of land. The formation and impact of this depression are unknown due to a lack of data. This depression was unusual in that tropical cyclones rarely form within such close range to another cyclone in this basin.

Tropical Depression Four was a short-lived cyclone that became the first tropical cyclone to enter the Central Pacific during the season. It formed on July 12 1,493 mi (2,403 km) west of South Point, Hawaii, and moved in a general westward direction. At one point in its track, it moved west-southwestward, reaching 15°N when it made a slow turn to the west-northwest. The depression moved into the Central Pacific, where the depression dissipated on July 14, having never affected land.

The next tropical depression, Eight, was only marginally longer-lived than the previous depression. The depression formed on July 30 1,515 mi (2,438 km) southeast of South Point, Hawaii. Initially moving west-southwestward, it eventually turned to a northwestward track, which it would move along until it dissipated on August 1 957 mi (1,540 km) east of Hawaii after being active for 60 hours.

Tropical Depression Eighteen was the only tropical cyclone formation to occur in the Central Pacific this season. It was first noticed in satellite pictures roughly 3,000 mi (4,800 km) west-southwest of Cabo San Lucas on August 29 and, after forming, moved to the northwest at a speed of 17 mph (27 km/h), crossing between Hawaii and Johnston Atoll until dissipating on August 31, having never affected land.

Tropical Depression Twenty-One was the longest lived depression. It formed on October 11 over 1,000 mi (1,600 km) south-southeast of Cabo San Lucas and moved slowly to the northwest before turning to the southwest. The depression dissipated on October 15 1,250 mi (2,010 km) south-southeast of the Baja California Peninsula. It never affected land.

Tropical Depression Twenty-Two formed on October 15 at near the border between Mexico and Guatemala. The depression paralleled the Mexican coast until it dissipated on October 17 about 350 mi (560 km) southeast of Acapulco. No reports of damages or casualties have been reported in connection to this depression. Although the best track in the document done by JTWC shows the existence of this depression, a track map with depression tracks done by the same organization did not show a listing for this depression.

== Storm names ==
The following list of names was used for named storms that formed in the Eastern Pacific in 1968. This is the same list as list 1 used during 1960–1965. The list was next used for the 1972 season.

- Annette
- Bonny
- Celeste
- Diana
- Estelle *
- Fernanda *
- Gwen
- Hyacinth
- Iva
- Joanne
- Kathleen *
- Liza
- Madeline
- Naomi
- Orla
- Pauline
- Rebecca
- Simone
- Tara
- Valerie (unused)
- Willa (unused)

At the time, named storms in the Central Pacific were assigned names from the Western Pacific's typhoon list. No named storms formed in the Central Pacific in 1968, though one, listed below, crossed into the basin from the Western Pacific. Named Eastern Pacific storms in the table above that crossed into the basin during the year are noted (*).

- Virginia

== See also ==
- List of Pacific hurricanes
- 1968 Atlantic hurricane season
- 1968 Pacific typhoon season
- 1966 North Indian Ocean cyclone season
- Australian region cyclone seasons: 1967–68 1968–69
- South Pacific cyclone seasons: 1967–68 1968–69
- South-West Indian Ocean cyclone seasons: 1967–68 1968–69
