= Hurricane Naomi =

Category 1 Pacific hurricane in 1968

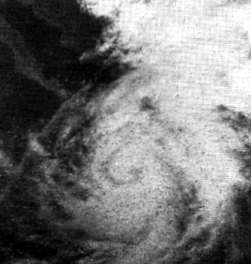
- Tropical Storm Naomi while undergoing rapid intensification on September 11, 1968 while off the coast of Mexico. This picture was taken shortly after the system was given a name.

Meteorological history
- Formed: September 9, 1968
- Dissipated: September 13, 1968

Category 1 hurricane
- 1-minute sustained (SSHWS/NWS)
- Highest winds: 85 mph (140 km/h)
- Lowest pressure: 979 mbar (hPa); 28.91 inHg

Overall effects
- Fatalities: 4 direct
- Damage: ≥$16 million (1968 USD)
- Areas affected: Mexico, Texas
- IBTrACS
- Part of the 1968 Pacific hurricane season

Hurricane Naomi was a short-lived and damaging Category 1 hurricane that made landfall in Mexico's Pacific coast during the 1968 Pacific hurricane season. After rapidly intensifying before its landfall in Sinaloa, Naomi caused rainfall throughout northern Mexico and the U.S. state of Texas in association with a frontal system, with the highest measurement occurring in Corpus Christi. Four people perished in Mexico due to Naomi's effects with ten more missing, all in Sinaloa. The only reported injury in Texas due to the remnants was a factory worker who was injured when the roof of the plant they were working in collapsed due to rainfall.

Naomi was the seventeenth tropical depression, fourteenth tropical storm and the fourth hurricane of the 1968 Pacific hurricane season. Its precipitation on the Mexican Altiplano briefly threatened the unfinished Lázaro Cárdenas dam on the Nazas River. If the dam failed, the twin cities of Gómez Palacio, Durango, and Torreón, Coahuila, would have been inundated. On the other hand, releasing water from the dam would have saved Torreón by submerging Gómez Palacio with the dam's runoff. From help with satellite imagery, the authorities decided to keep the dam closed—risking its possible failure—saving both towns.

== Meteorological history ==
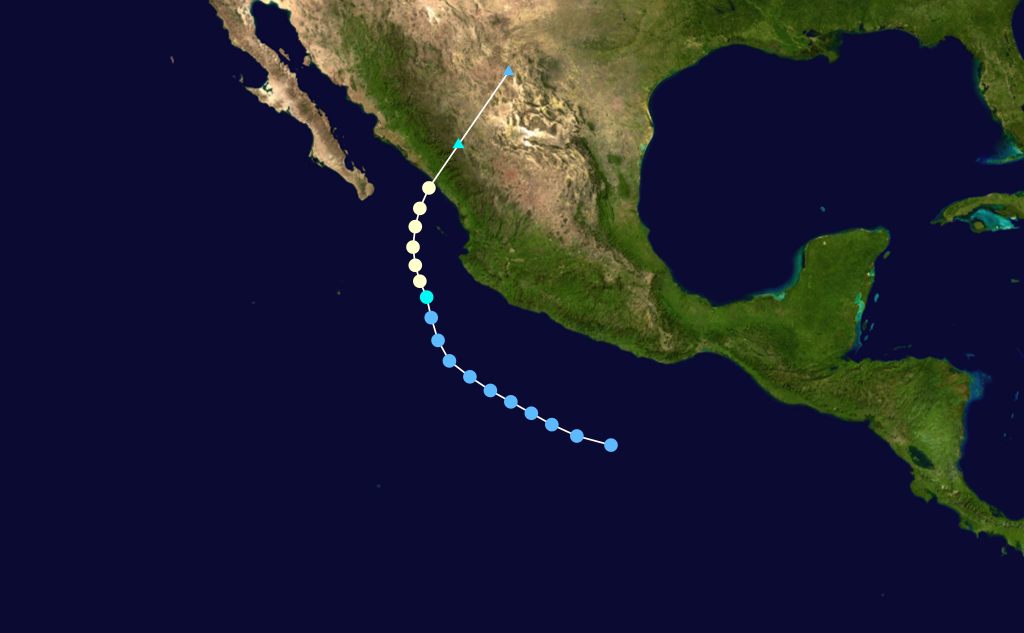
Map plotting the storm's track and intensity, according to the Saffir–Simpson scale Map key Saffir–Simpson scale Tropical depression (≤38 mph, ≤62 km/h) Tropical storm (39–73 mph, 63–118 km/h) Category 1 (74–95 mph, 119–153 km/h) Category 2 (96–110 mph, 154–177 km/h) Category 3 (111–129 mph, 178–208 km/h) Category 4 (130–156 mph, 209–251 km/h) Category 5 (≥157 mph, ≥252 km/h) Unknown Storm type Tropical cyclone Subtropical cyclone Extratropical cyclone, remnant low, tropical disturbance, or monsoon depression

The disturbance that developed into Hurricane Naomi was reported in the Intertropical Convergence Zone on September 8 at 12 °N, 98 °W. At that time, a ship called the Avisfaith reported winds to the south-southwest of force 7 on the Beaufort Scale 30 mi (48 km) south of this position, the equivalent of a strong tropical depression on the Saffir–Simpson hurricane scale. On September 9, six more ships reported winds of 35 mph (56 km/h) from the system, which was at 13°N, 101°W at the time, and the system was given depression status on the same day. Later that day, satellite pictures clearly showed the vortex and center of the developing cyclone, and on September 10, the first report of tropical storm force winds were reported south of the low by the ship Builder, which showed winds of 40 mph (64 km/h). The depression continued to develop at a rapid pace, with large feeder bands which helped to absorb moisture to strengthen the cyclone extending from the center, which was becoming better defined. One of the feeder bands developed near Manzanillo, Colima, which reported winds of 45 mph (72 km/h) from the band prior to daybreak. Towards the end of the day, the Allison Lykes reported 60 mph (97 km/h) winds from the cyclone and, early on September 11, sufficient evidence that the depression had reached tropical storm status resulted in the cyclone being upgraded and named "Naomi".

For the next twelve hours, Naomi continued to rapidly intensify, with feeder bands flowing into a tightening spiral structure in the center of the storm. Ship reports around this time showed winds of 60 mph (97 km/h) to 65 mph (105 km/h). Towards midnight, a computerized mosaic showed a clear eye and Naomi was upgraded to hurricane strength early on September 12 while at 19.8°N, 106.8°W based on the mosaic, an intensity that was verified by the Meisei Maru, which reported winds of 75 mph (121 km/h) at 6:00 Greenwich Mean Time (GMT). After being upgraded, the hurricane moved to the north at a pace of 9 mph (14 km/h) before making a slow northeastward turn. The turn had the hurricane passing 30 mi (48 km) – 40 mi (64 km) west of Mazatlán, Sinaloa. The hurricane then began to accelerate, landfalling on Sinaloa near Punta Piaxtla at 3:00 GMT on September 13. Shortly after landfall, the Sierra Madre Occidental took a toll on the hurricane, causing it to dissipate later that day while midway between Chihuahua, Chih., and Piedras Negras, Coah., with the remnants moving over Texas. In total, the hurricane travelled 1,100 mi (1,800 km) while active.

== Impact and naming ==
=== Mexico ===
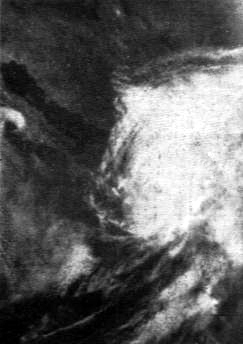
Hurricane Naomi on September 12, prior to landfall

A dispatch from the Associated Press to Mexico City reported that 20,000 citizens from villages in Durango, Sinaloa, Nayarit, and Jalisco evacuated due to the threat of flooding and high winds from Naomi. The damage from Naomi in Mexico was moderate, although no monetary figures have ever been released. The Associated Press dispatch also reported that Naomi was responsible for knocking out communications over a large area in Mazatlán as well as downing power lines and damaging houses. At least 2000 people were reported homeless in Durango due to the hurricane. The hurricane also caused damage to Highway 15 between Mazatlán and Tepic. Although the highway reopened soon afterward, some areas that were struck by the hurricane were still rough. Naomi's most notable impact in Mexico involved the Lázaro Cárdenas Dam on the Nazas River, which was not complete by the time the hurricane hit. The dam, upriver from Gómez Palacio and Torreón, was feared to break down from the water being built up behind it, influenced by the hurricane. The two options were to either open the dam, saving Torreón by inundating Gómez Palacio, or risk inundating both towns by keeping the dam closed. The decision was made harder by the fact that, if the dam was released and no rain fell to refill the basin behind the dam, the farms would have insufficient water for agricultural growth. Photography from the Environmental Science Services Administration's Automatic Picture Transmission based on the ESSA-6 weather satellite showed that the clouds from Naomi responsible for the rain had almost moved over the area near the dam. Based on the images, the authorities decided to gamble on the dam to successfully hold up, and it managed to hold back the waters without breaking. The hurricane caused four drowning deaths and $16 million in damage in Sinaloa.

=== Texas ===
Selected rainfall totals in Texas
Location	Amount	
Location	Inches	Millimetre
Corpus Christi	8	200
Aransas Pass	3.05	77.5
Camp Wood	2.12	53.8
Uvalde	2.06	52.3
Brackettville	1.31	33.3
San Angelo	1.26	32.0
Rocksprings	1.00	25.4

In Texas, the remnants of Naomi coupled with a frontal system resulted in prolonged rains over the state. The hardest hit city was Corpus Christi, which reported over 8 inches (200 mm) of rain in relation to the disturbance as well as funnel clouds to the south and west of the city, resulting in many roads being stopped to traffic. Accumulated rainfall caused the roof of a tortilla plant to collapse, slightly injuring a worker. Although the range of heavy rains was large, only minor rains were reported in Andrews, Crane, Monahans, Kermit, Wink, Stanton, and Pecos. Despite the totals, the rain proved beneficial as well, helping saturate areas of grassland in need of water.

=== Naming ===
This was the second time an East Pacific storm was named Naomi and the only time that a storm named Naomi in the basin reached hurricane strength. Because the effects from the hurricane were minor, the name was not retired after this hurricane and was re-used in the 1976 season. However, a name change in 1978 dropped the name Naomi, and the name has not been used since.

== See also ==
- Other tropical cyclones named Naomi
- List of Pacific hurricanes
- Malpasset—A French dam that broke in 1959 due to circumstances similar to those that affected the Lázaro Cárdenas Dam, killing 421.
