= List of storms named Naomi =

The name Naomi has been used for three tropical cyclones in the Eastern Pacific Ocean.

- Tropical Storm Naomi (1961)
- Hurricane Naomi (1968)
- Tropical Storm Naomi (1976)

The name Naomi has been used twice in the Australian region.

- Cyclone Naomi (1983) – remained out at sea.
- Cyclone Naomi (1993)
