= Hurricane Pauline (1968) =

Category 1 Pacific hurricane in 1968

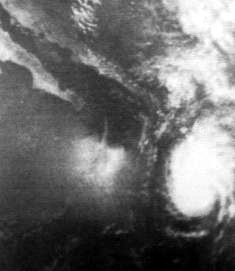
- Pauline as a newly-upgraded tropical storm on September 29.

Meteorological history
- Formed: September 26, 1968
- Dissipated: October 3, 1968

Category 1 hurricane
- 1-minute sustained (SSHWS/NWS)
- Highest winds: 85 mph (140 km/h)
- Lowest pressure: ≤1002 mbar (hPa); ≤29.59 inHg

Overall effects
- Fatalities: 5 direct
- Areas affected: Northwestern Mexico, California, Arizona, Utah, New Mexico
- IBTrACS
- Part of the 1968 Pacific hurricane season

Hurricane Pauline was the deadliest hurricane of the 1968 Pacific hurricane season. Forming from a disturbance in the Intertropical Convergence Zone on September 26 and becoming a tropical storm on September 29, the hurricane strengthened to a peak of 85 mph (137 km/h) as a Category 1 hurricane on the Saffir-Simpson Hurricane Scale on September 30 before making landfall just east of La Paz, Baja California Sur, near Ciudad Constitución in Mexico, exiting over the Gulf of California. Before making a second landfall on the state of Sonora on October 3, Pauline lost tropical characteristics. The storm continued inland, passing directly over Ciudad Obregón before dissipating south-southeast of Sierra Vista, Arizona.

There is very little information as to the effects of Pauline on Mexico, but during the passage of the hurricane over Magdalena Bay, a boat disappeared with its five occupants. Despite a large-scale search for the boat or any possible remnants, no trace was ever found. The remnants of Pauline triggered showers over the southwest United States and may have been responsible for a damaging tornado which occurred near Glendale, Arizona.

== Meteorological history ==
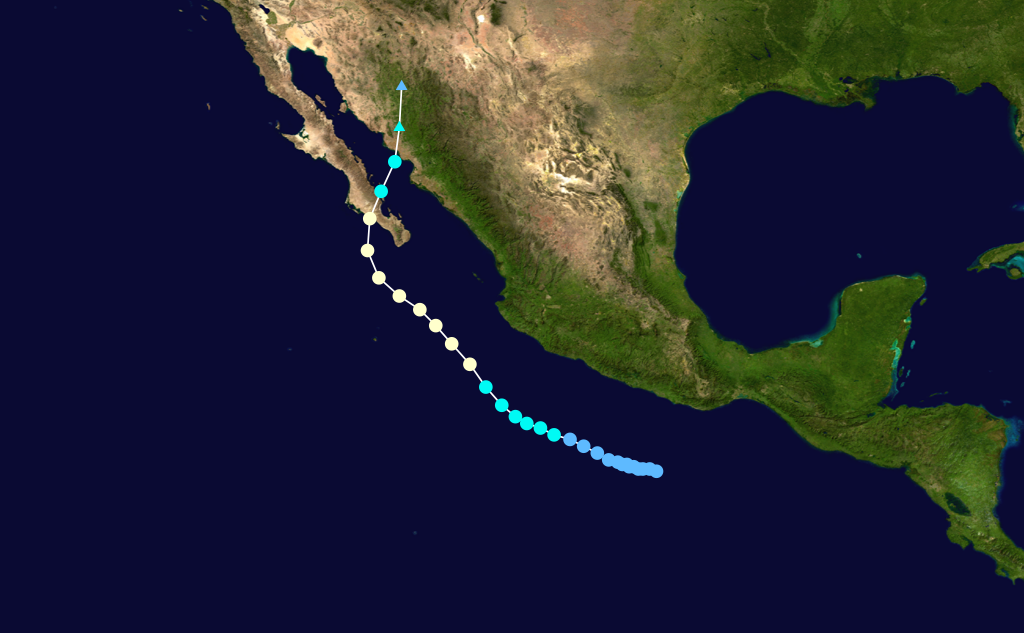
Map plotting the storm's track and intensity, according to the Saffir–Simpson scale Map key Saffir–Simpson scale Tropical depression (≤38 mph, ≤62 km/h) Tropical storm (39–73 mph, 63–118 km/h) Category 1 (74–95 mph, 119–153 km/h) Category 2 (96–110 mph, 154–177 km/h) Category 3 (111–129 mph, 178–208 km/h) Category 4 (130–156 mph, 209–251 km/h) Category 5 (≥157 mph, ≥252 km/h) Unknown Storm type Tropical cyclone Subtropical cyclone Extratropical cyclone, remnant low, tropical disturbance, or monsoon depression

The Intertropical Convergence Zone disturbance that developed into Hurricane Pauline was first noticed by meteorologists 200 mi (320 km) southeast of Acapulco and 1,500 mi (2,400 km)-2,000 mi (3,200 km) west of dissipating Tropical Storm Orla. The disturbance was in a large area of convection west of Guatemala in the Gulf of Tehuantepec that began to spread 500 mi (800 km) to the west-northwest on September 26. Satellite imagery at this time showed an area of reflective clouds roughly 500 mi (800 km) long and 200 mi (320 km) wide. Shortly thereafter, the disturbance was upgraded into a tropical depression. After being upgraded, a vortex began to organize at its center and the depression began to intensify. On September 29, a ship 200 mi (320 km) south of the center reported winds of 17 mph (27 km/h) to 23 mph (37 km/h) and a minimum pressure of 1008 mbar, the only pressure reading left on best track data for the entire season. Other than this ship, all other active boats steered away from the center of the developing system. Later that day, it was determined that the depression had reached tropical storm strength.

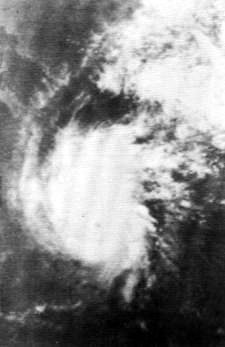
Hurricane Pauline on September 30. The wave effect was caused by an electronic problem.

After being named, Pauline displayed signs of a tight circulation, but satellite pictures were unable to pick up any distinct features due to nearby cirrus outflow. Later that day, however, satellites picked up a feature in the hurricane that resembled an eye, but closer inspection showed that the eye was either a shadow or a gap between bands and that the real center was 50 mi (80 km) west of the eye. On September 30, the storm turned to the northwest and its forward speed accelerated to 9 mph (14 km/h). Around this time, a satellite picture showed a genuine eye beginning to form and banding features became apparent. Even though the picture was distorted due to by electronic problems, the tropical storm was subsequently upgraded to hurricane intensity. On October 1, the ship Overseas Joyce recorded 80 mph (130 km/h) to 85 mph (137 km/h) north-northeast winds, a heavy swell from the east-southeast and a pressure of 1002 mbar. An estimate based on satellite pictures placed the Overseas Joyce at 15 mi (24 km) to 20 mi (32 km) away from the center. Another nearby ship, the Golden Eagle, reported south-southeast winds of 50 mph (80 km/h) and high seas 75 mi (121 km) east of the center.

Further investigation into the hurricane was limited to ship reports, and a satellite image on October 1 was mostly not helpful due to another electronic problem; however, it showed that the hurricane had shrunk. A United States Air Force reconnaissance plane flew into the hurricane that day and reported that the eyewall was open on the southwest quadrant. After the breakup of the first eyewall, a break in the clouds lead to the possibility that another eye was forming 30 mi (48 km) to the north-northwest of the previous eye.

No information on the hurricane was available for October 2, when it made landfall near Ciudad Constitutión in Baja California Sur. After landfall, La Paz reported winds of 60 mph (97 km/h) from the northwest, which began weakening in the next hour. Satellite imagery showed that Pauline had moved over the Gulf of California, the interaction with land having weakened it to a tropical storm. The storm moved north, making a second landfall near Navojoa. The storm continued inland, passing directly over Ciudad Obregón. The storm dissipated south-southeast of Sierra Vista in Arizona.

== Impact ==
Damage totals from Baja California Sur in relation to the hurricane were never received, but light damage was reported in Navojoa. The Pasadena-based newspaper reported that a tourist in Mazatlán at the time had sent a card saying that the hurricane was responsible for cutting off-shore capers. Mexican Navy members in Magdalena Bay reported that while passing over, Pauline had clocked winds of 115 mph (185 km/h), the equivalent of a Category 3 hurricane on the Saffir-Simpson Hurricane Scale. The Navy report of 115 mph (185 km/h) winds came after another report that the 40-foot (12 m) auxiliary-powered yawl called the Tiare was missing in the same bay. The ship had left Newport Harbor on September 25 with the destination being Puerto Vallarta and was occupied by a family of five people. The last reported sighting of the yawl was off Cedros Island. After the report of the missing yawl was received, the United States Coast Guard engineered a search for the vessel. The search was called off after covering an area of 50,000 mi^{2} (130,000 km^{2}) with no results. The ship was reported as lost and the five occupants were listed as dead. Despite not finding any sign of the ship, the Coast Guard was praised for the extensive search.

The remnants of Pauline were responsible for scattered showers in an area ranging from southern California to Utah and New Mexico. In Arizona, Tucson, Phoenix, and Gila Bend all reported rain on October 3 even though Pauline was centered 200 mi (320 km) southeast of Douglas. The remnants also caused an F2 tornado on the Fujita Scale. The tornado touched down near Glendale and followed an erratic path to the west, injuring three people due to flying glass, one of which was hospitalized due to their injuries, and causing severe damage to two apartment buildings. Automobiles were damaged by falling concrete blocks and various buildings and trailers were also damaged. In total, the tornado was responsible for $50,000 to $500,000 in damages.

== See also ==
- List of Pacific hurricanes
