= 1997 Pacific typhoon season =

Typhoon season in the Western Pacific Ocean

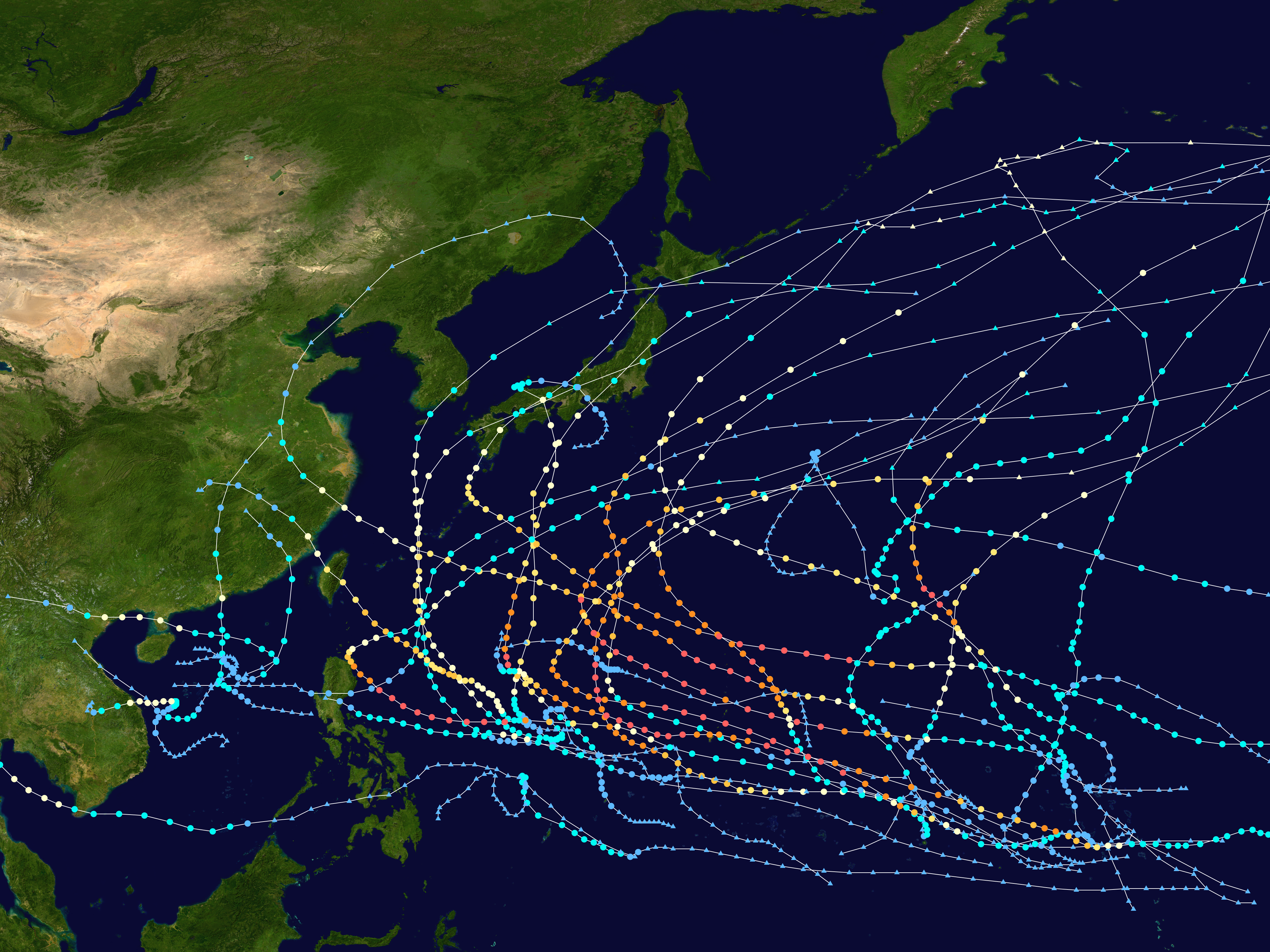
- Season summary map

Seasonal boundaries
- First system formed: January 19, 1997
- Last system dissipated: December 23, 1997

Strongest storm
- By maximum sustained winds: Keith
  - Maximum winds: 205 km/h (125 mph) (10-minute sustained)
  - Lowest pressure: 910 hPa (mbar)
- By central pressure: Ivan and Joan
  - Maximum winds: 195 km/h (120 mph) (10-minute sustained)
  - Lowest pressure: 905 hPa (mbar)

Seasonal statistics
- Total depressions: 47
- Total storms: 28
- Typhoons: 16
- Very strong typhoons: 11
- Violent typhoons: 3
- ACE: 570.4 (highest on record in any basin)
- Total fatalities: 4,159 total
- Total damage: > $5.073 billion (1997 USD)

Related articles
- 1997 Atlantic hurricane season; 1997 Pacific hurricane season; 1997 North Indian Ocean cyclone season

The 1997 Pacific typhoon season was a record-breaking season featuring eleven tropical cyclones reaching super typhoon intensity, tying the record with 1965 with the most intense tropical cyclones globally, and was the ninth and last consecutive year of above-average tropical cyclone activity that started in 1988. Its extremely high activity produced the highest ACE index ever recorded in a single tropical cyclone season. In addition, this season had ten Saffir-Simpson Category 5-equivalent tropical cyclones, the most ever recorded in a single regional tropical cyclone season. The 1997–98 El Niño event was a contributing factor to this unusually high activity. Despite this, the season produced an average number of tropical storms, spawning 28 tropical storms.

It has no official bounds; it ran year-round in 1997, but most tropical cyclones tend to form in the northwestern Pacific Ocean between May and November. These dates conventionally delimit the period of each year when most tropical cyclones form in the northwestern Pacific Ocean. The first named storm, Hannah, developed on January 20 while the last named storm, Paka, dissipated on December 23. Tropical Storm Linda became the worst tropical cyclone to hit Vietnam, killing over 3,000 people.

The scope of this article is limited to the Pacific Ocean to the north of the equator between 100°E and 180th meridian. Within the northwestern Pacific Ocean, there are two agencies which assign names to tropical cyclones which can often result in a cyclone having two names. The Japan Meteorological Agency (JMA) (Note: The Japan Meteorological Agency is the official Regional Specialized Meteorological Center for the western Pacific Ocean.) will name a tropical cyclone if it has 10-minute sustained wind speeds of at least 65 km/h (40 mph) anywhere in the basin, while the Philippine Atmospheric, Geophysical and Astronomical Services Administration (PAGASA) assigns names to tropical cyclones which are active in the Philippine Area of Responsibility (PAR), located between 135°E and 115°E and between 5°N–25°N, regardless of whether or not a tropical cyclone has already been given a name by the JMA. Tropical depressions that are monitored by the United States' Joint Typhoon Warning Center (JTWC) (Note: The Joint Typhoon Warning Center is a joint United States Navy – United States Air Force task force that issues tropical cyclone warnings for the western Pacific Ocean and other regions.) (Note: A super typhoon is an unofficial category used by the Joint Typhoon Warning Center (JTWC) for a typhoon with winds of at least 240 km/h (150 mph).) are given a number with a "W" suffix.

== Seasonal summary ==
Most intense Pacific typhoon seasons
Rank	Seasons	ACE value
1	1997	570.4
2	2004	480.6
3	1992	470.1
4	2015	462.9
5	1994	454.6
6	1958	445.8
7	1957	440.2
8	1965	436.2
9	1962	423
10	1996	416.5

The accumulated cyclone energy (ACE) index for the 1997 Pacific typhoon season as calculated by Colorado State University using data from the Joint Typhoon Warning Center was 570.4 units, which is the highest ACE for a single season ever recorded. Broadly speaking, ACE is a measure of the power of a tropical or subtropical storm multiplied by the length of time it existed. It is only calculated for full advisories on specific tropical and subtropical systems reaching or exceeding wind speeds of 39 miles per hour (63 km/h).

The season was unusual and exceptional in the number of super typhoons that occurred in the basin. According to the Joint Typhoon Warning Center, eleven tropical cyclones attained super typhoon status, ten of which became Category 5 Super Typhoons, marking the highest number of Category 5 storms in a single season on record. Eleven typhoons reached winds of at least 135 knots. They were Isa, Nestor, Rosie, Winnie, Bing, Oliwa (from Central Pacific), Ginger, Ivan, Joan, Keith, and Paka (also from the Central Pacific). This was due to the El Niño of 1997–1998, which contributed to the record amounts of not only super typhoons but also tropical storms in the Western and Eastern Pacific. Fortunately, most of the stronger systems remained at sea. This is also due to the El Niño during that time, which tends to shift typhoon tracks east. When Severe Tropical Storm Peter made landfall in southern Japan on June 27, it marked the first time that two tropical cyclones made landfall in mainland Japan during the month of June since reliable records began in 1951.

== Systems ==
=== Tropical Depression Hannah (Atring) ===
- Tropical depression (JMA)
- Tropical storm (SSHWS)
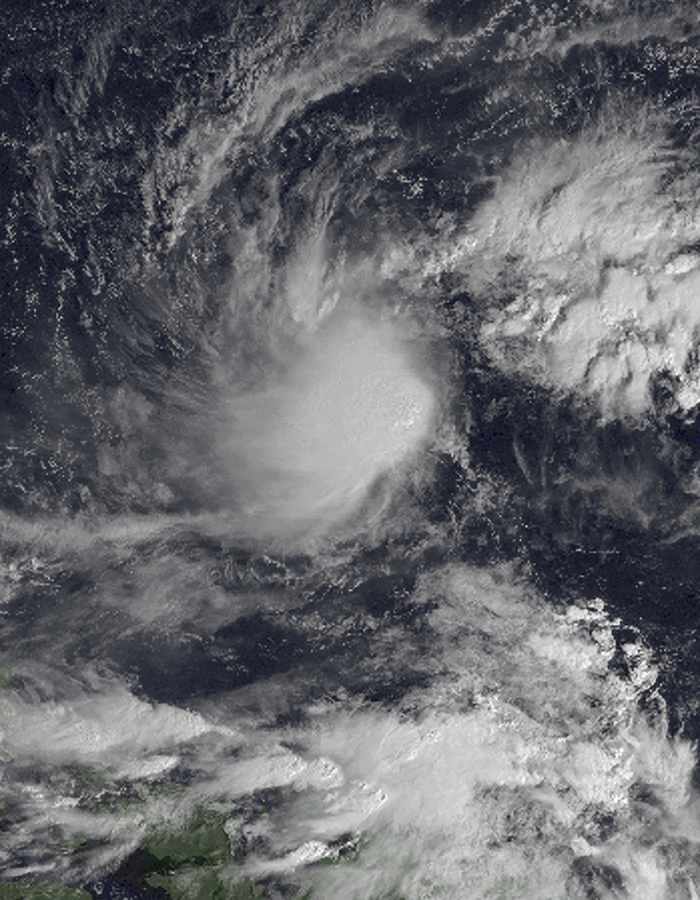
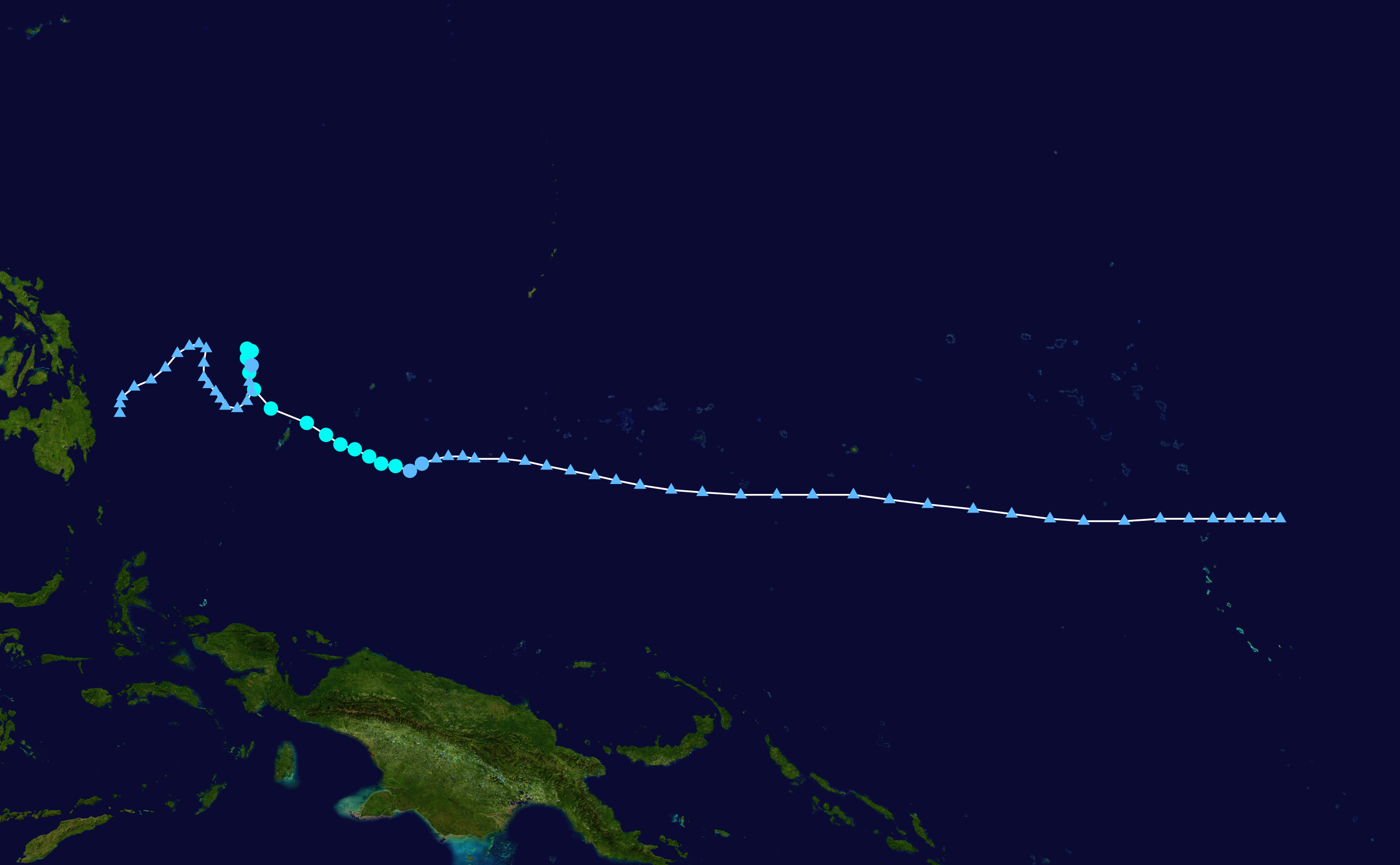
- Duration: January 19 – January 24
- Peak intensity: 55 km/h (35 mph) (10-min); 1002 hPa (mbar)

In early January, an area of convection developed along a near-equatorial trough just west of the International Date Line. It tracked steadily westward, and remained disorganized for about week. On January 18, deep convection increased as a low-level circulation began to form, and at 0000 UTC on January 19 it developed into Tropical Depression 01W while located to the southwest of Guam. Based on satellite imagery estimates, the Joint Typhoon Warning Center upgraded it to Tropical Storm Hannah six hours after first forming. The deep convection quickly organized into well-defined cyclonic bands, and early on January 20 Hannah attained its peak intensity of 60 mph near the island of Yap. Increased southeasterly wind shear weakened the storm, leaving its dwindling convection situated along the northern portion of the circulation. Interaction with a large and powerful extratropical cyclone left the storm moving erratically, and on January 22 Hannah weakened to tropical depression status. Its motion turned to a steady southwestward motion, and on January 27 Hannah dissipated a short distance east of the Philippine island of Mindanao.

Near the end of its duration, the Philippine Atmospheric, Geophysical and Astronomical Services Administration began issuing warnings on Hannah when was a tropical depression; the institution named the storm Tropical Depression Atring. Hannah was not considered a tropical storm by the Japan Meteorological Agency. There were no reports of significant damage or injuries.

=== Typhoon Isa ===
- Very strong typhoon (JMA)
- Category 5 super typhoon (SSHWS)
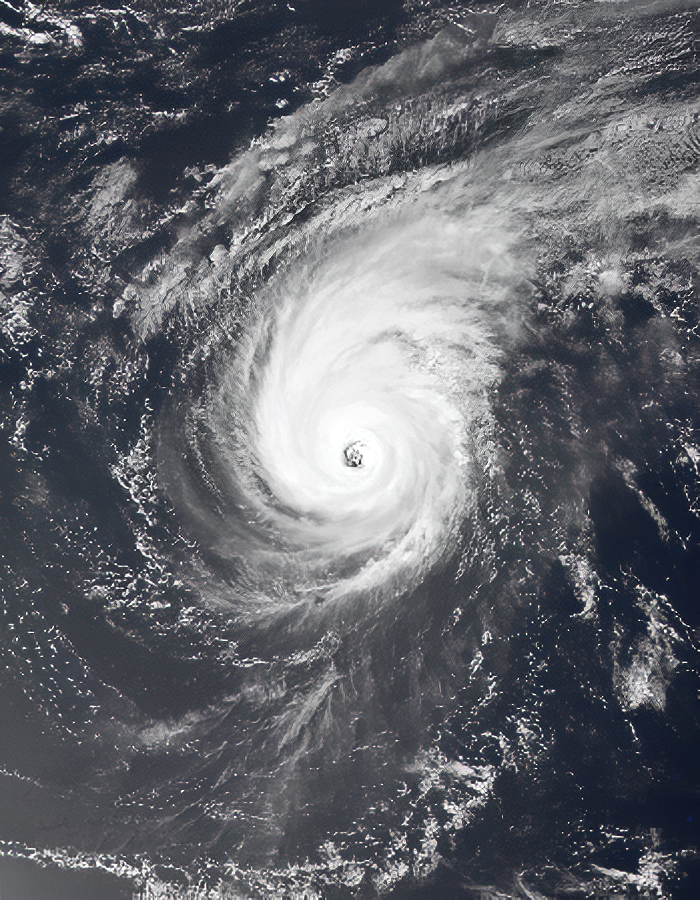
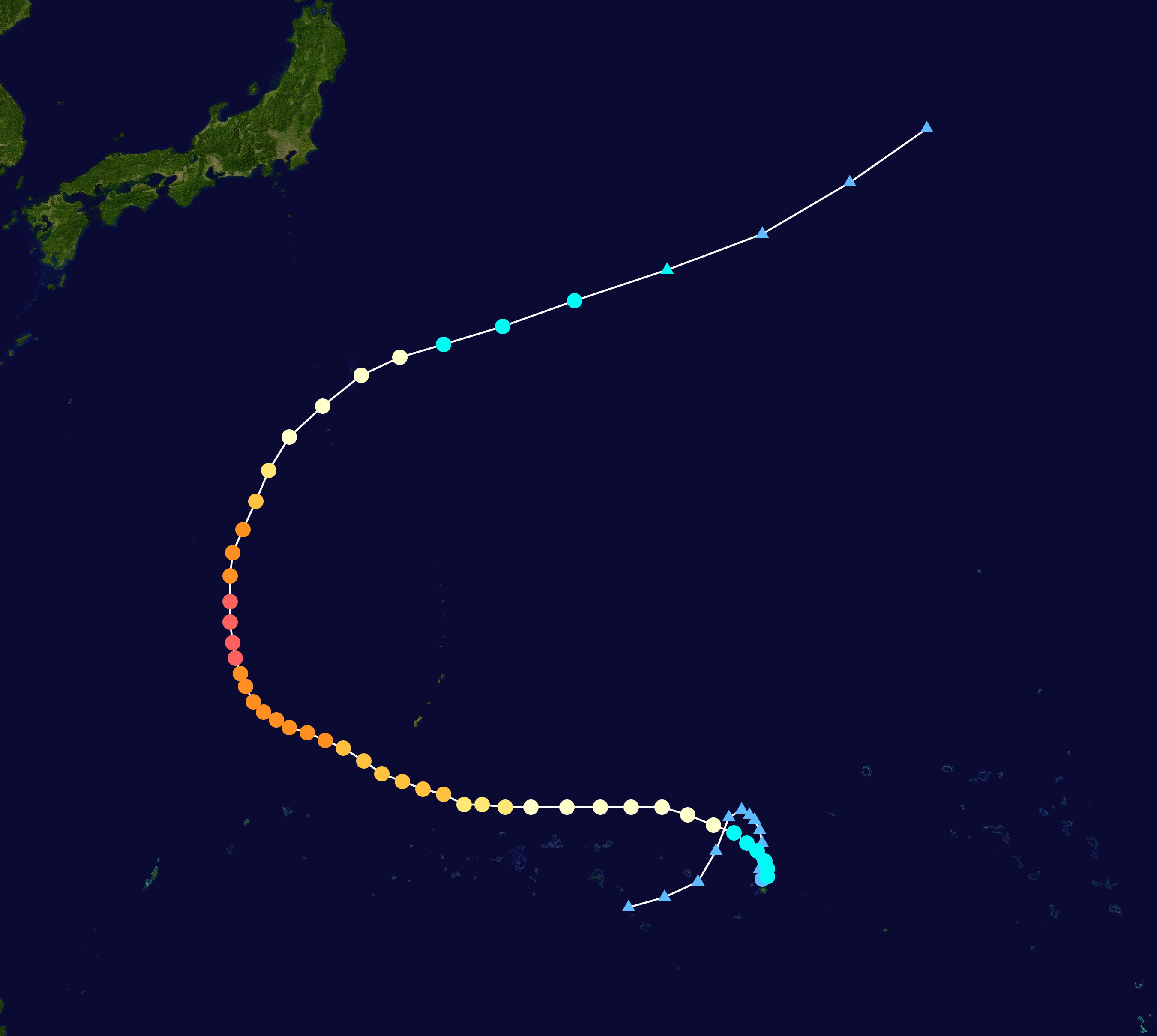
- Duration: April 12 – April 23
- Peak intensity: 155 km/h (100 mph) (10-min); 940 hPa (mbar)

Isa developed from a disturbance in the monsoon trough near the Caroline Islands on April 12. It moved erratically at first, though after attaining tropical storm status it curved westward due to the subtropical ridge to its north. Isa very gradually intensified, and on April 20 the typhoon reached peak 1-min winds of 270 km/h (170 mph), as reported by the Joint Typhoon Warning Center; Japan Meteorological Agency reported maximum 10-min winds of 155 km/h (96 mph). After turning northward, it accelerated to the northeast, and merged with a larger extratropical cyclone on April 24.

Early in its duration, Isa caused light rainfall and moderate winds on Pohnpei. Later, a stationary rainband from the typhoon dropped heavy precipitation on Guam during its dry season. Damage in the Guam National Weather Service area of responsibility totaled $1 million (1997 USD, $1.3 million 2006 USD), the majority of it from crop damage. No deaths were reported.

=== Tropical Storm Jimmy ===
- Tropical storm (JMA)
- Tropical storm (SSHWS)
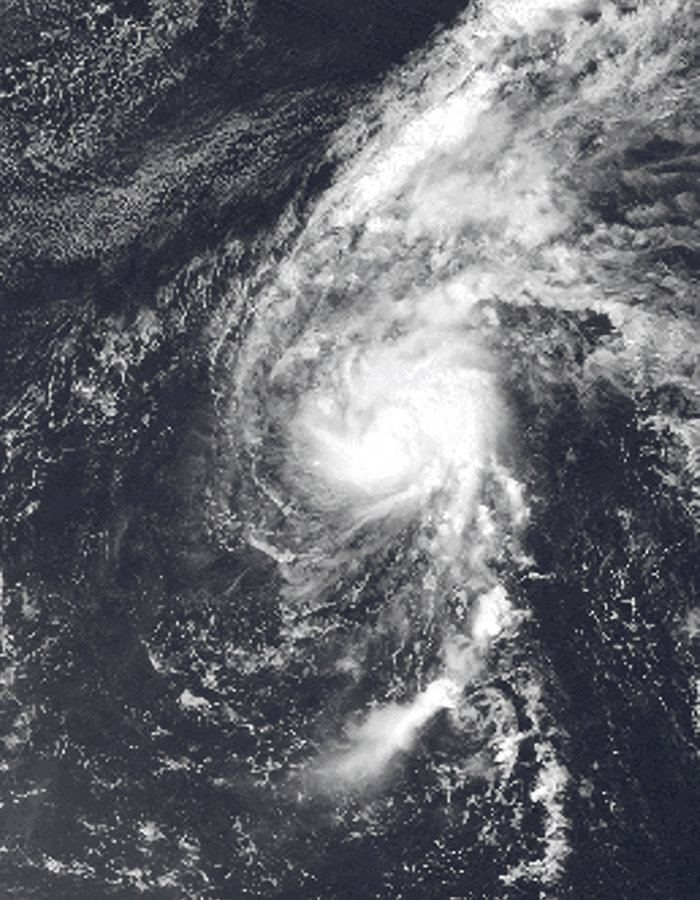
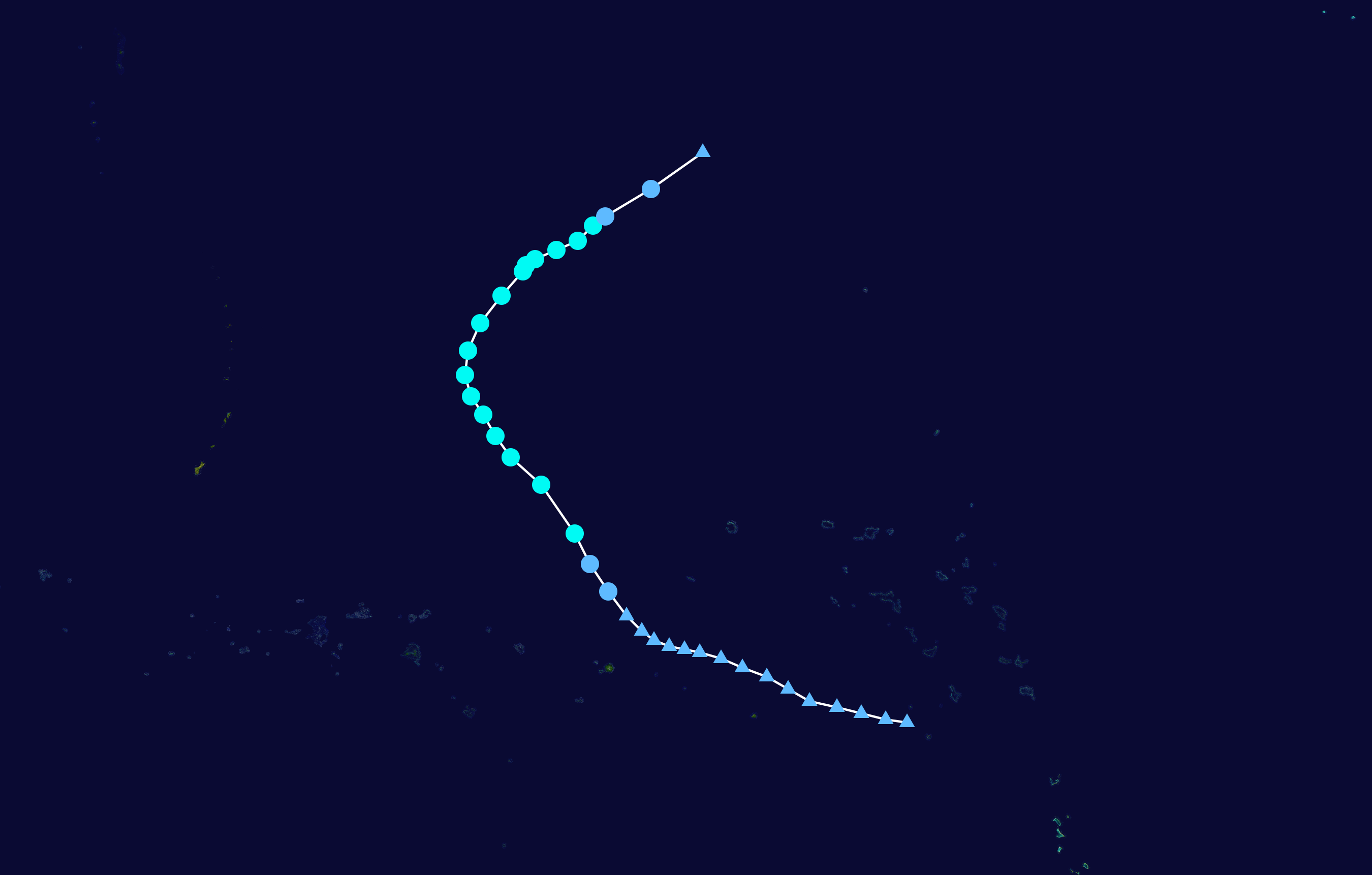
- Duration: April 22 – April 26
- Peak intensity: 65 km/h (40 mph) (10-min); 994 hPa (mbar)

A low-level equatorial westerly wind system developed an area of convection on April 18, the same system that previously developed Typhoon Isa. It drifted west-northwestward, and on April 21 separated from the westerly wind system. At 0400 UTC on April 22, the Joint Typhoon Warning Center (JTWC) issued a Tropical Cyclone Formation Alert on the system, and two hours later the JTWC issued the first warning on Tropical Storm Jimmy about 1,360 km (850 mi) southeast of Guam. Coinciding with its first warning, the Japan Meteorological Agency (JMA) classified it as a tropical depression.

Jimmy continued northwestward through a break in the subtropical ridge caused by Isa, and it steadily intensified as it tracked through an area of light vertical wind shear. It recurved to the northeast, and shortly after reaching its westernmost point Jimmy attained its peak intensity of 55 mph on April 24. Conversely, JMA assessed Jimmy as remaining a minimal tropical storm throughout its duration. After maintaining peak winds for about 18 hours, to increased southwesterly winds aloft quickly weakened the storm, and late on April 25 JTWC issued its final advisory on Jimmy after its low-level circulation center became completely exposed from the deep convection. On April 26, Jimmy was absorbed by an approaching frontal trough over the open Pacific Ocean. The storm had little effects on land.

=== Tropical Storm Kelly ===
- Tropical storm (JMA)
- Tropical storm (SSHWS)
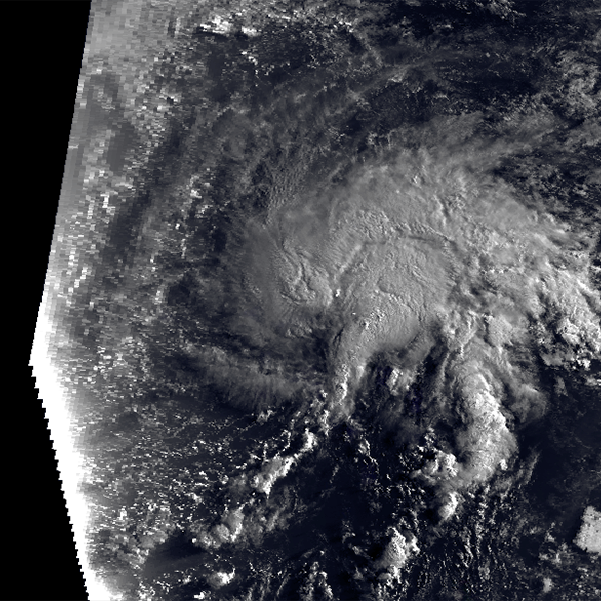
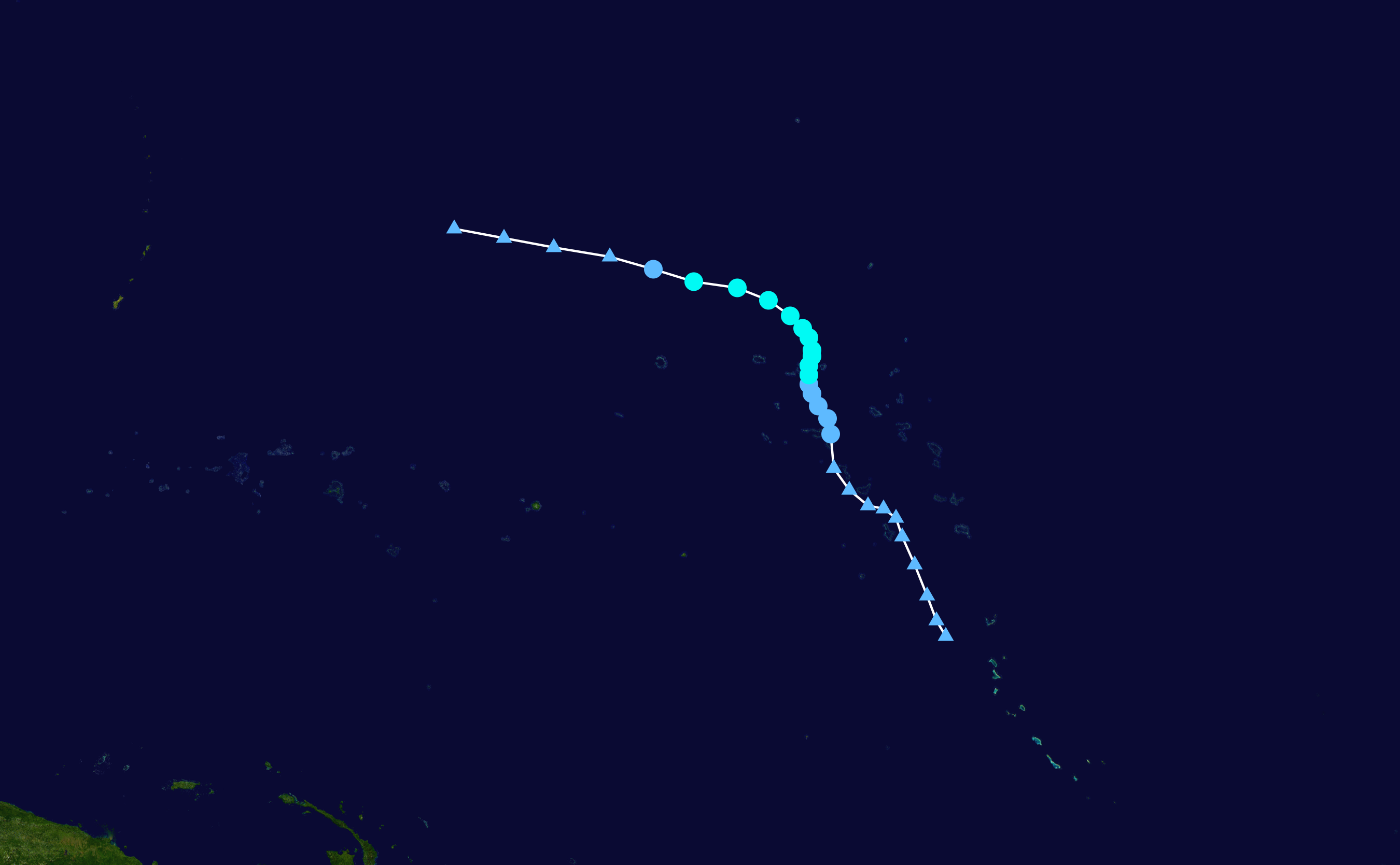
- Duration: May 6 – May 10
- Peak intensity: 65 km/h (40 mph) (10-min); 998 hPa (mbar)

A low-level equatorial trough developed an area of convection on May 4. The low strengthened as it became more organized over the next two days. Late on May 5, the JTWC issued a TCFA and the system was declared Tropical Depression 04W shortly after. The depression slowly intensified and was upgraded to a Tropical Storm early on May 8 and was named Kelly. Kelly was able to intensify slightly before strong vertical wind shear displaced the center, weakening Kelly. Kelly was downgraded to a Tropical Depression on May 10 and the remnant circulation dissipated the next day.

=== Tropical Storm Levi (Bining) ===
- Tropical storm (JMA)
- Tropical storm (SSHWS)
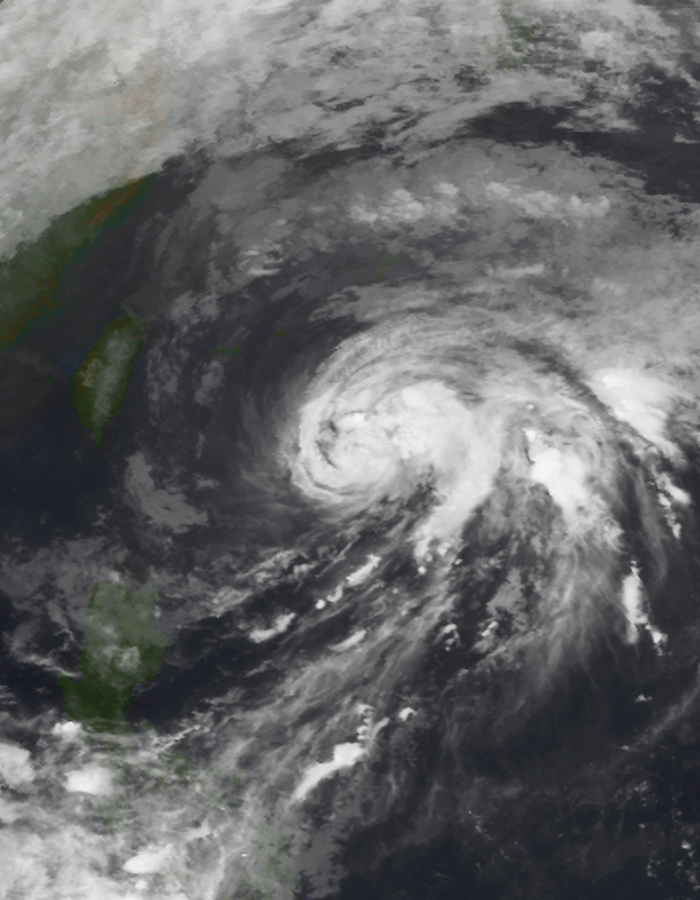
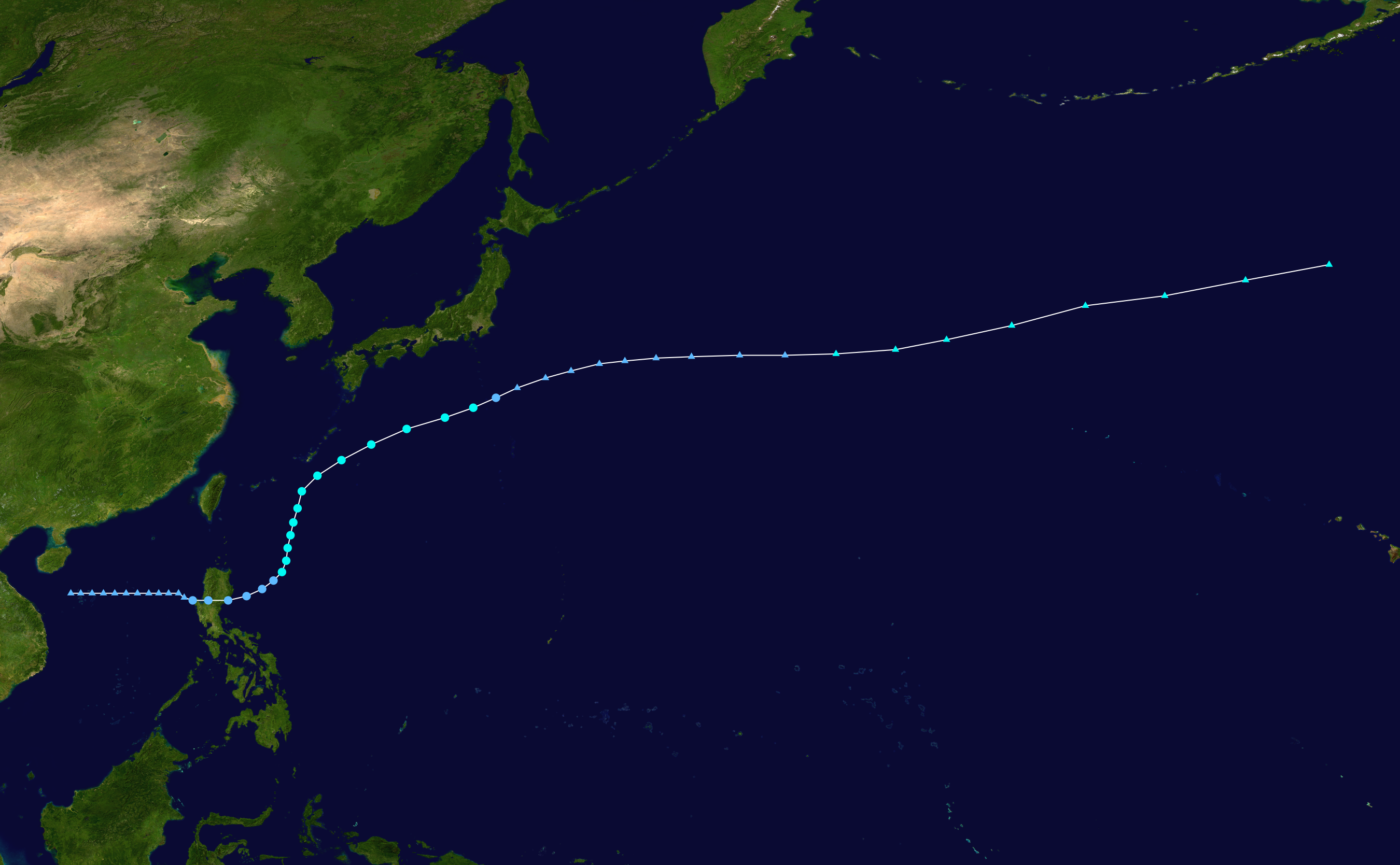
- Duration: May 26 – May 30
- Peak intensity: 75 km/h (45 mph) (10-min); 992 hPa (mbar)

Tropical Depression 5W drifted eastward through the Philippines in late May. The depression continued northeastward, becoming a tropical storm, and transitioning to an extratropical storm on May 30. In the Philippines, Levi killed 53 people and displaced 210,000 others.

From May 26–29, Philippine Atmospheric, Geophysical and Astronomical Services Administration tracked the storm, and named it Bining.

=== Typhoon Marie ===
- Typhoon (JMA)
- Category 2 typhoon (SSHWS)
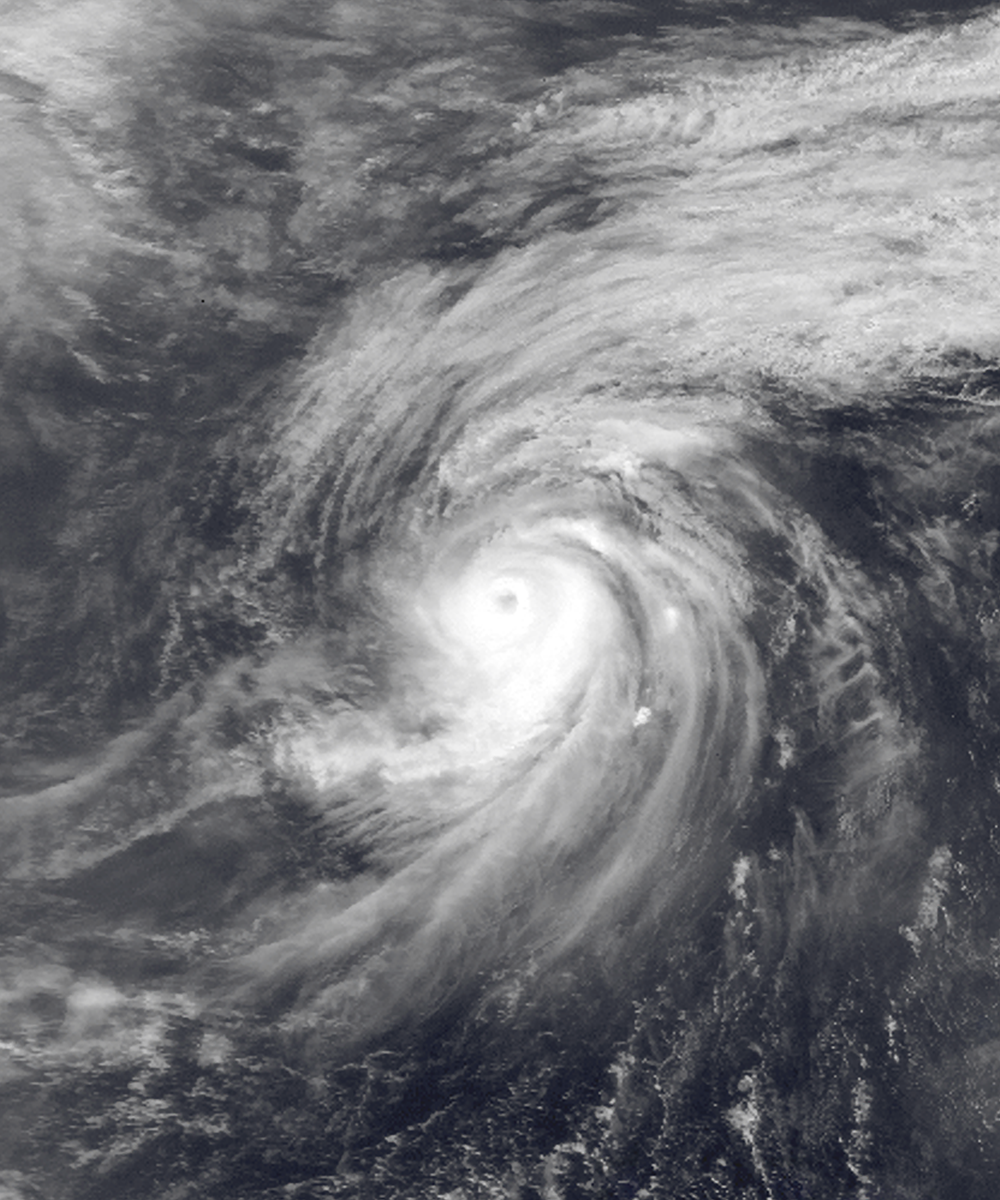
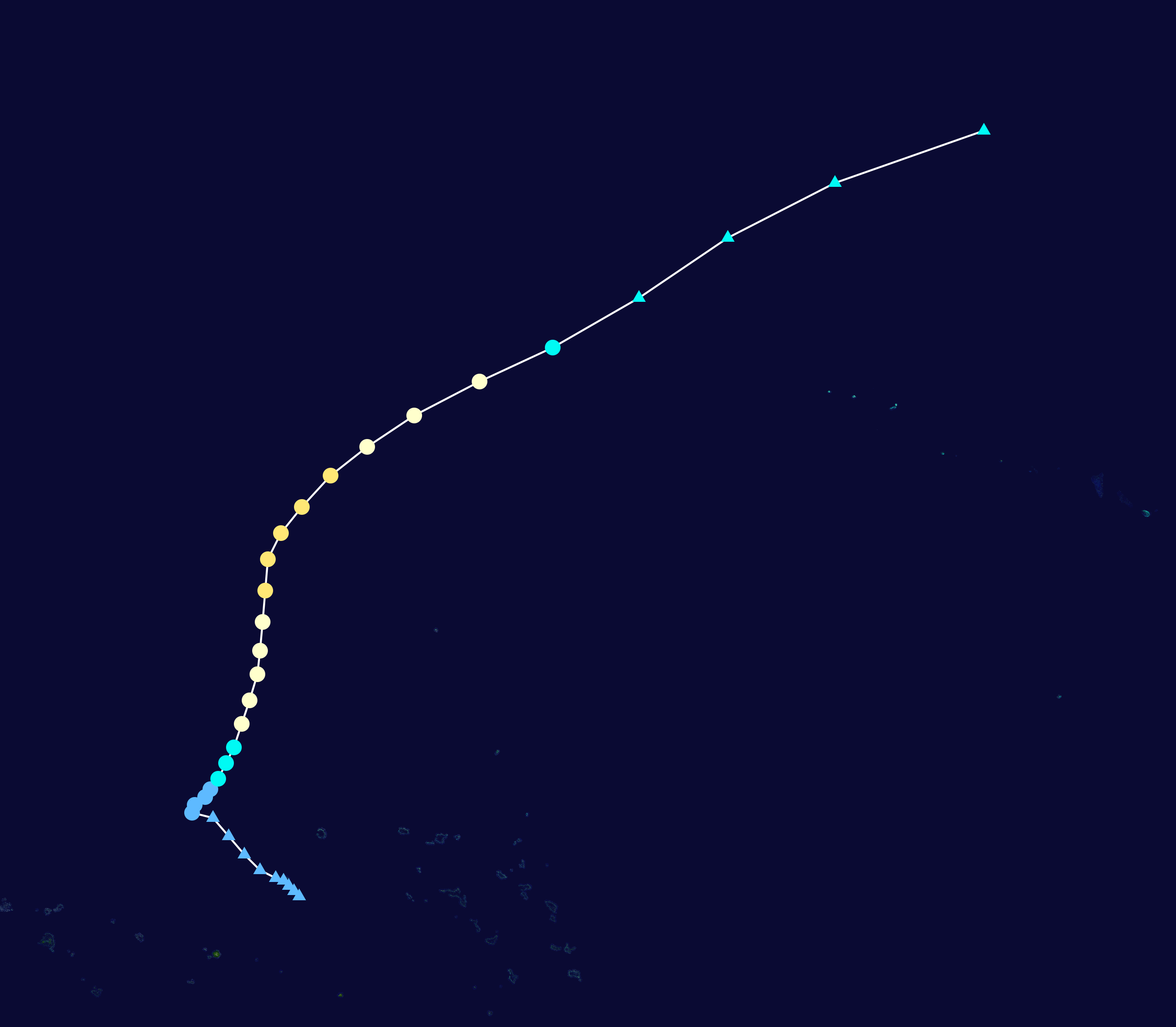
- Duration: May 27 – June 1
- Peak intensity: 120 km/h (75 mph) (10-min); 965 hPa (mbar)

On May 23, a large area of convection grouped together to form a low pressure, over the Mariana Islands. It strengthened into a tropical depression on May 26, before intensifying into a category 1 typhoon 2 days later. Marie then reached its peak intensity on May 31, as a category 2 typhoon, before undergoing an Eyewall replacement cycle. The storm developed double eyewalls during the process. On June 2, the system degenerated into an extratropical cyclone.

=== Typhoon Nestor ===
- Very strong typhoon (JMA)
- Category 5 super typhoon (SSHWS)
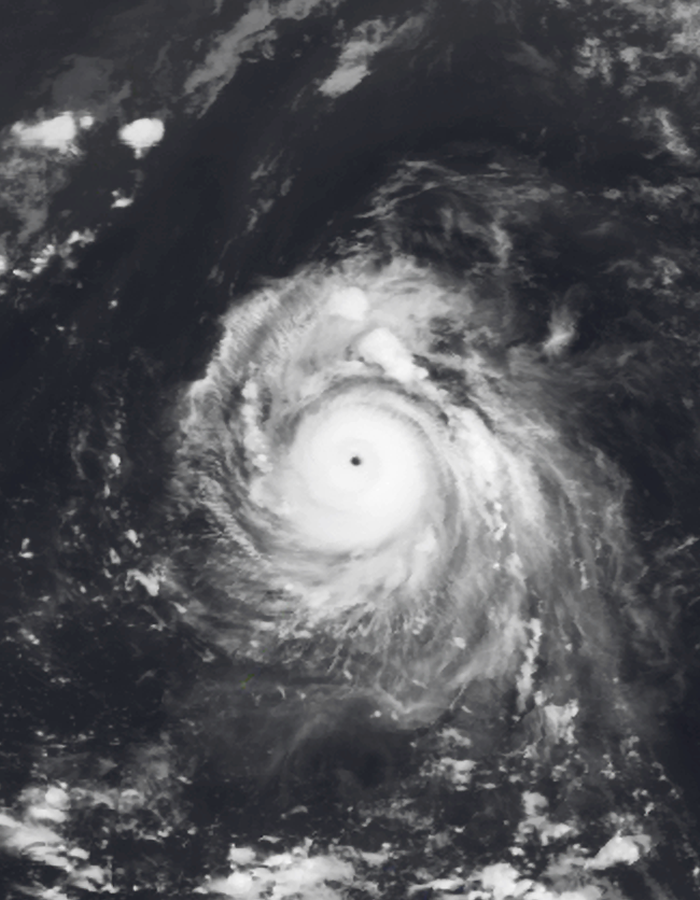
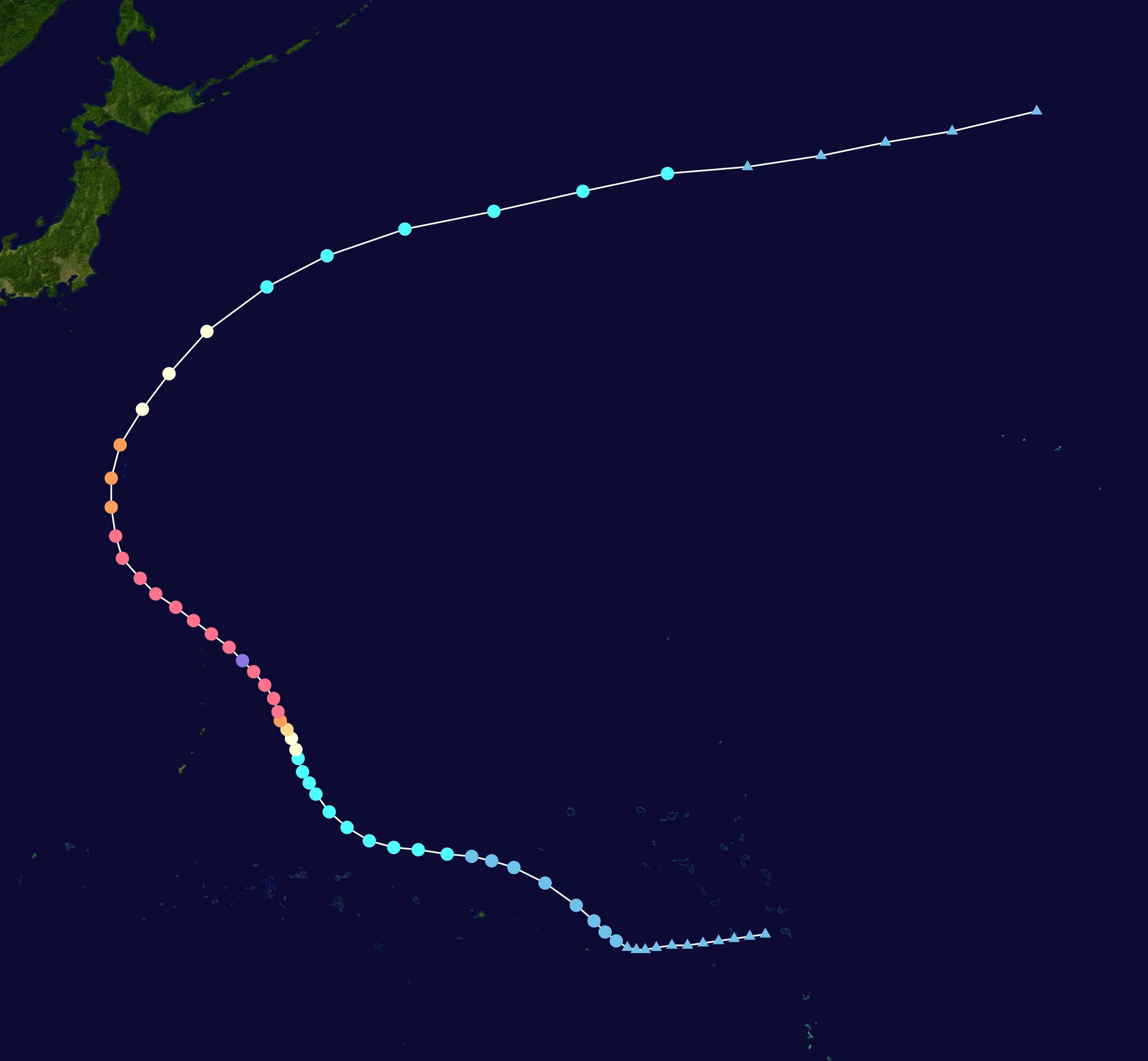
- Duration: June 5 – June 14
- Peak intensity: 185 km/h (115 mph) (10-min); 930 hPa (mbar)

In late May, an area of convection developed near the Marshall Islands, and rapidly became a low-pressure area. On June 1, the low-pressure area organized into a tropical depression. Nestor intensified into a category 1 typhoon on June 7, as it started to affect the Mariana Islands. Nestor continued to intensify, and on June 10, Nestor reached its peak intensity as a category 5 super typhoon, as the storm began to affect the Northern Mariana Islands. At this time, Nestor began showing annular characteristics. Nestor began to weaken slowly, as typical annular typhoons do, while it developed an eye measuring 65 kilometers across. On June 15, Nestor transitioned into an extratropical cyclone.

=== Typhoon Opal (Kuring) ===
- Typhoon (JMA)
- Category 2 typhoon (SSHWS)
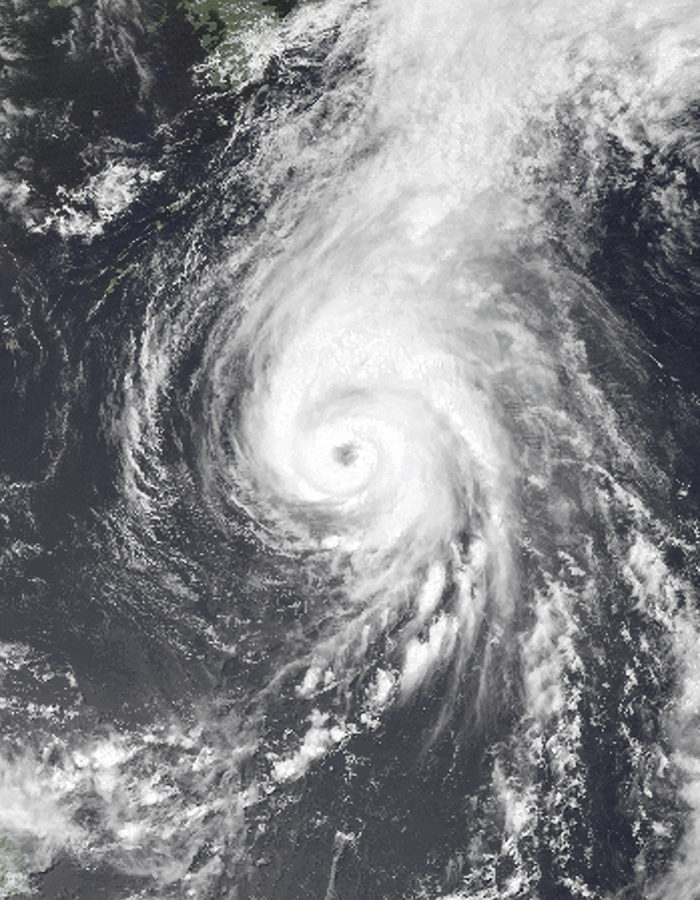
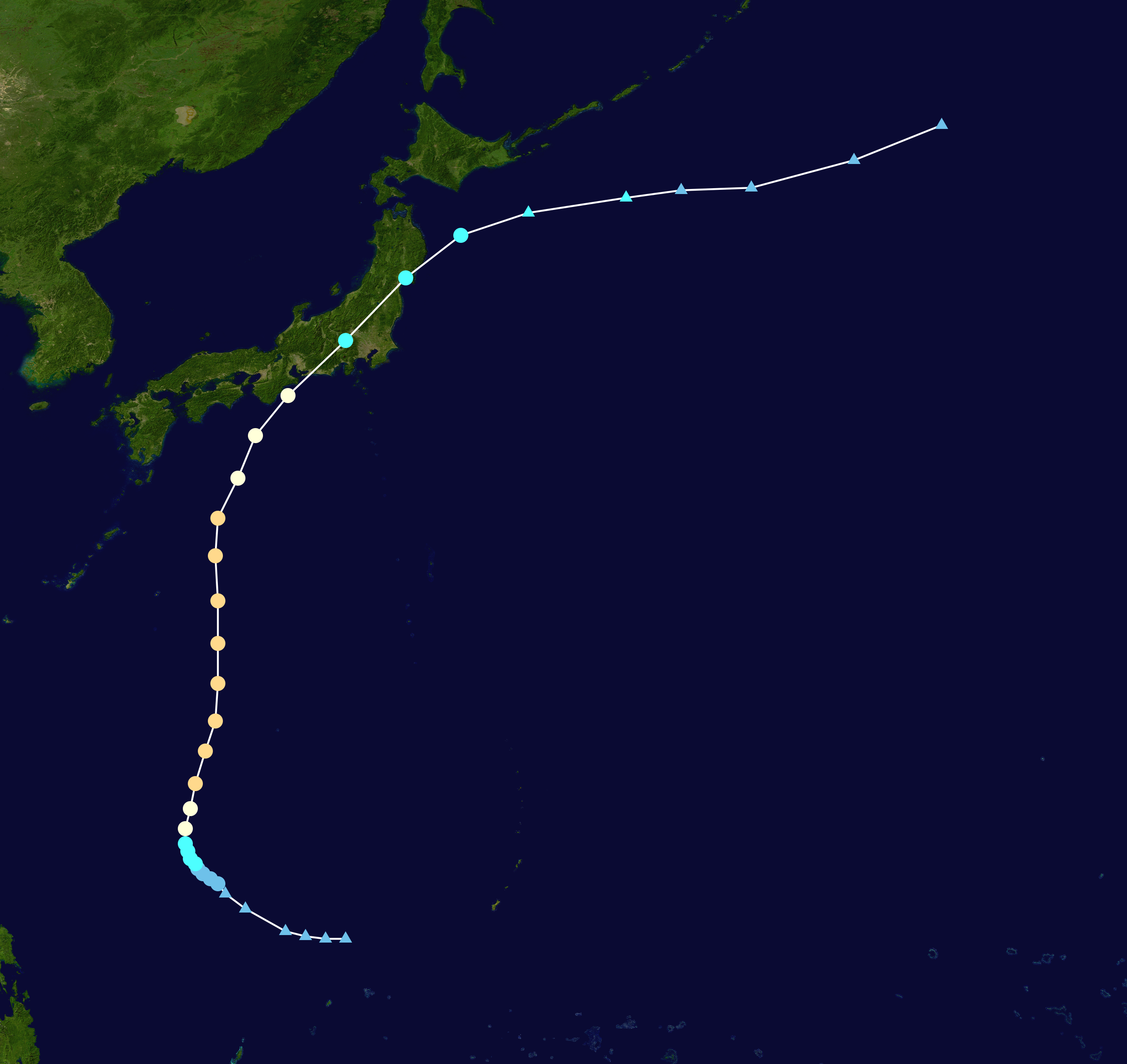
- Duration: June 14 – June 20
- Peak intensity: 140 km/h (85 mph) (10-min); 960 hPa (mbar)

From June 15–18, Philippine Atmospheric, Geophysical and Astronomical Services Administration tracked the storm, and named it Kuring.

In preparation for Opal, Japanese airlines cancelled 107 domestic flights and port officials halted all ferry traffic. Throughout Japan, 6,750 schools were closed due to the typhoon. One person drowned after being knocked off his boat by rough seas while trying to secure it at port. Heavy rains flooded streets throughout the region. The storm triggered 14 landslides, flooded 50 homes and cut power to 800 residences. In all, three people were killed in Japan by Typhoon Opal. Damages totaled to ¥392 million (US$3.24 million).

=== Typhoon Peter (Daling) ===
- Typhoon (JMA)
- Category 1 typhoon (SSHWS)
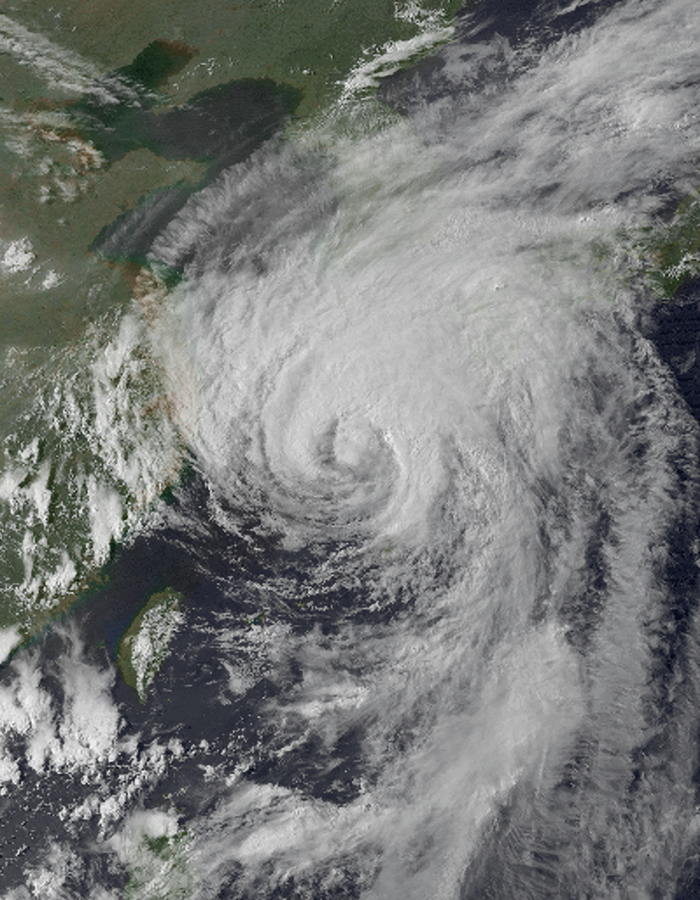
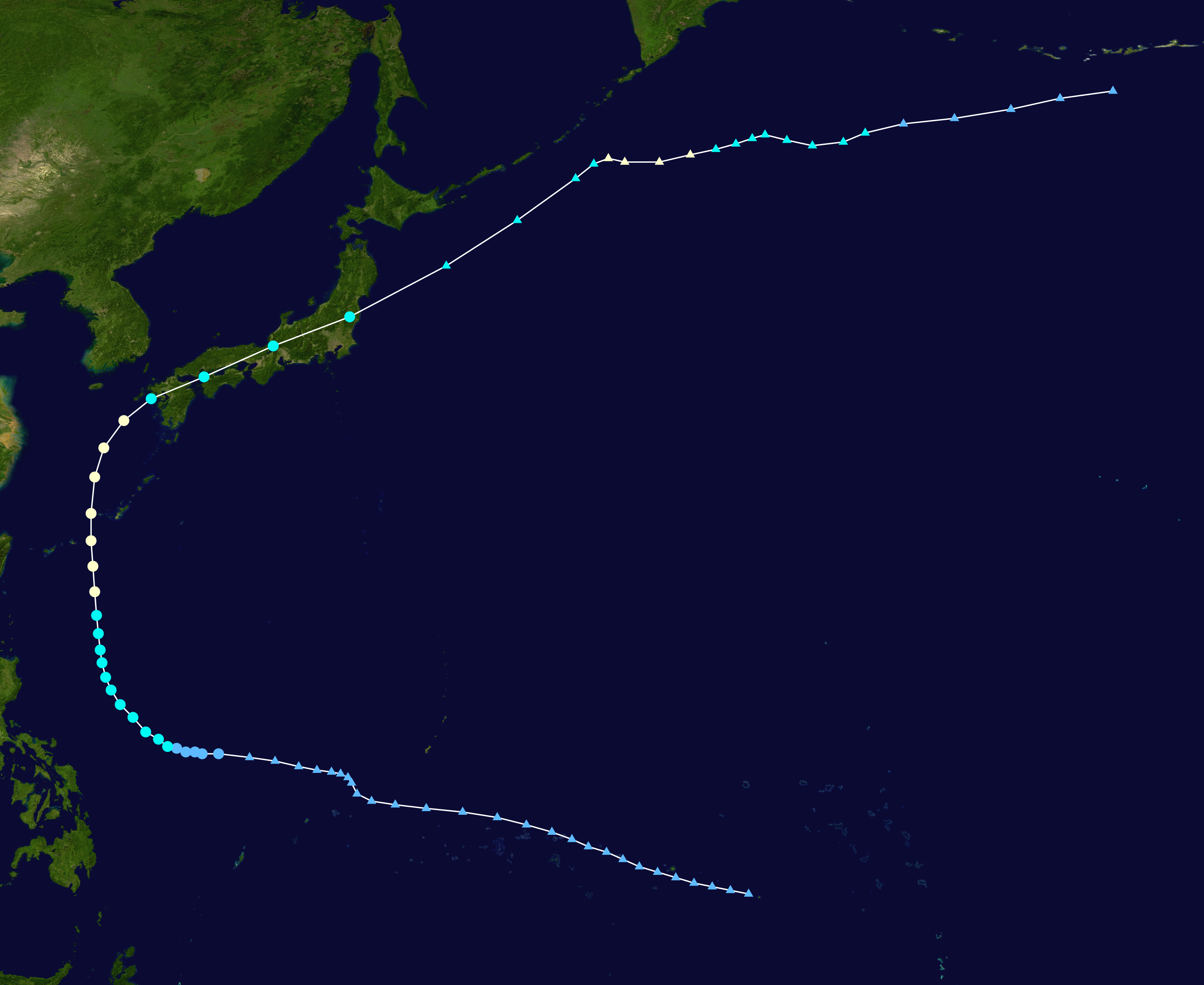
- Duration: June 22 – June 28
- Peak intensity: 120 km/h (75 mph) (10-min); 970 hPa (mbar)

From June 22–26, PAGASA tracked the storm, and named it Daling.

Ahead of the storm, international and domestic flights were cancelled throughout Japan and ferry service was suspended. Heavy rains produced by the storm triggered landslides throughout Japan, resulting in three fatalities. A landslide caused a train derailment that left 28 people injured after covering the tracks. One of the fatalities from the storm was that of a United States soldier stationed in Iwakuni. The JMA estimated that upwards of 14 in (360 mm) of rain fell due to Typhoon Peter. Damages totaled to ¥231.6 million (US$1.91 million).

=== Typhoon Rosie (Elang) ===
- Very strong typhoon (JMA)
- Category 5 super typhoon (SSHWS)
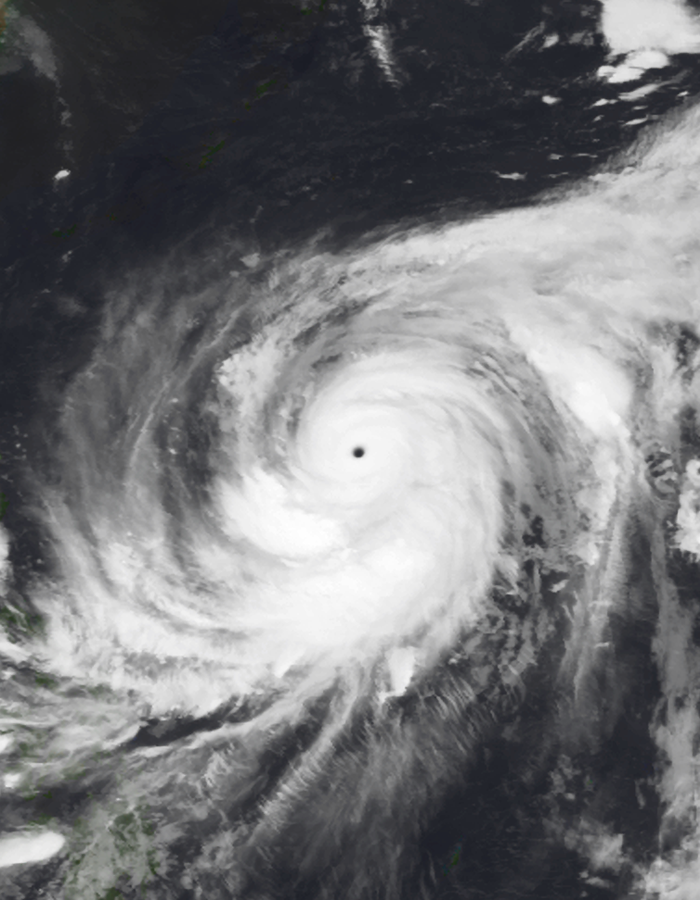
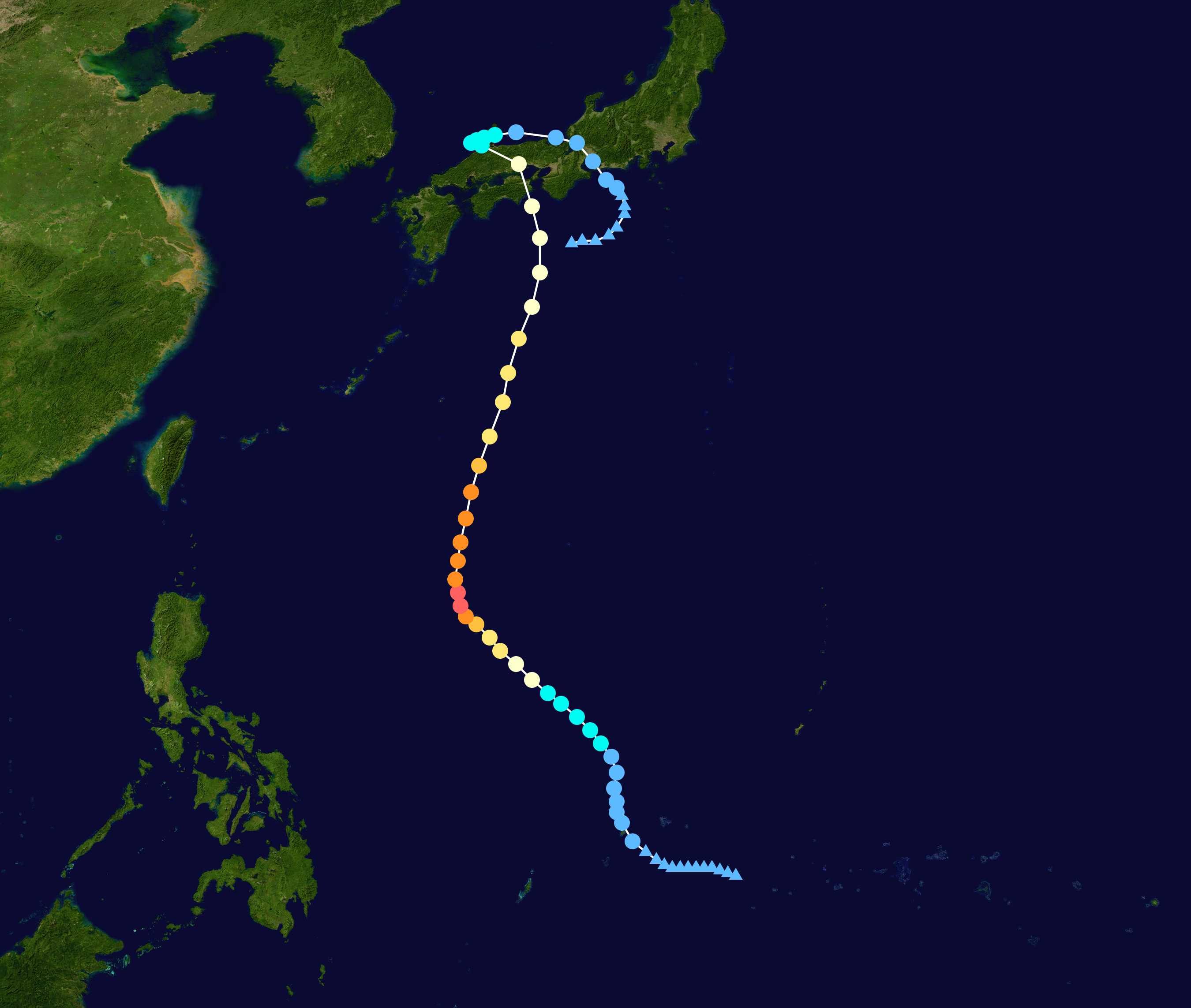
- Duration: July 18 – July 31
- Peak intensity: 185 km/h (115 mph) (10-min); 920 hPa (mbar)

On July 18, Tropical Depression 10W formed near Caroline Islands. 10W was upgraded to Tropical Storm Rosie and became a Category 5 Super Typhoon on July 22. Rosie moved northward and began to weaken. Rosie made a landfall as a Category 1 typhoon at Shikoku, Japan on July 26. In Japan, five people were killed and 1,200 were displaced by the storm. Damages totaled to ¥11.1 billion (US$91.7 million).

From July 22–26, PAGASA tracked the storm, and named it Elang.

=== Tropical Storm Scott ===
- Tropical storm (JMA)
- Tropical storm (SSHWS)
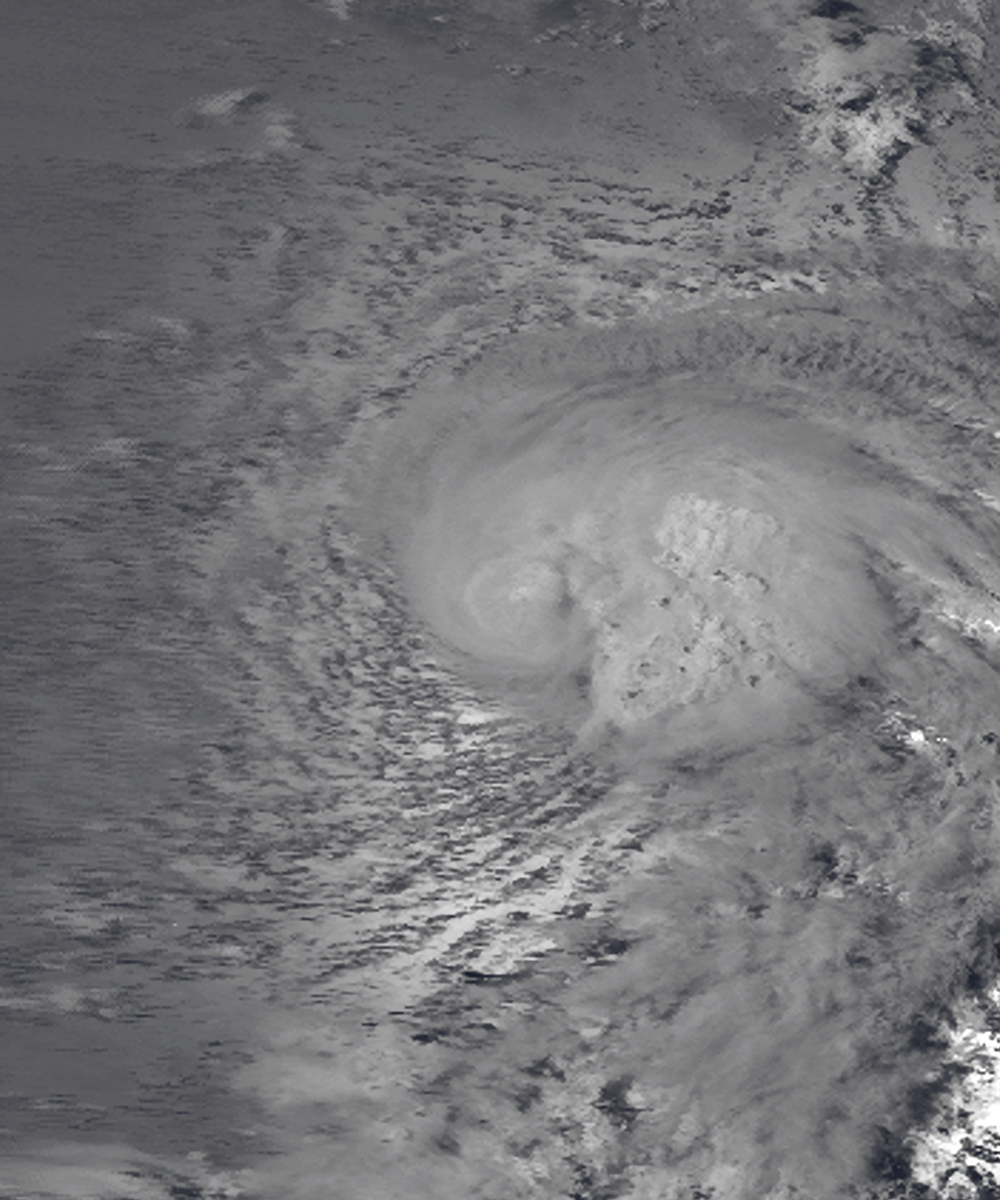
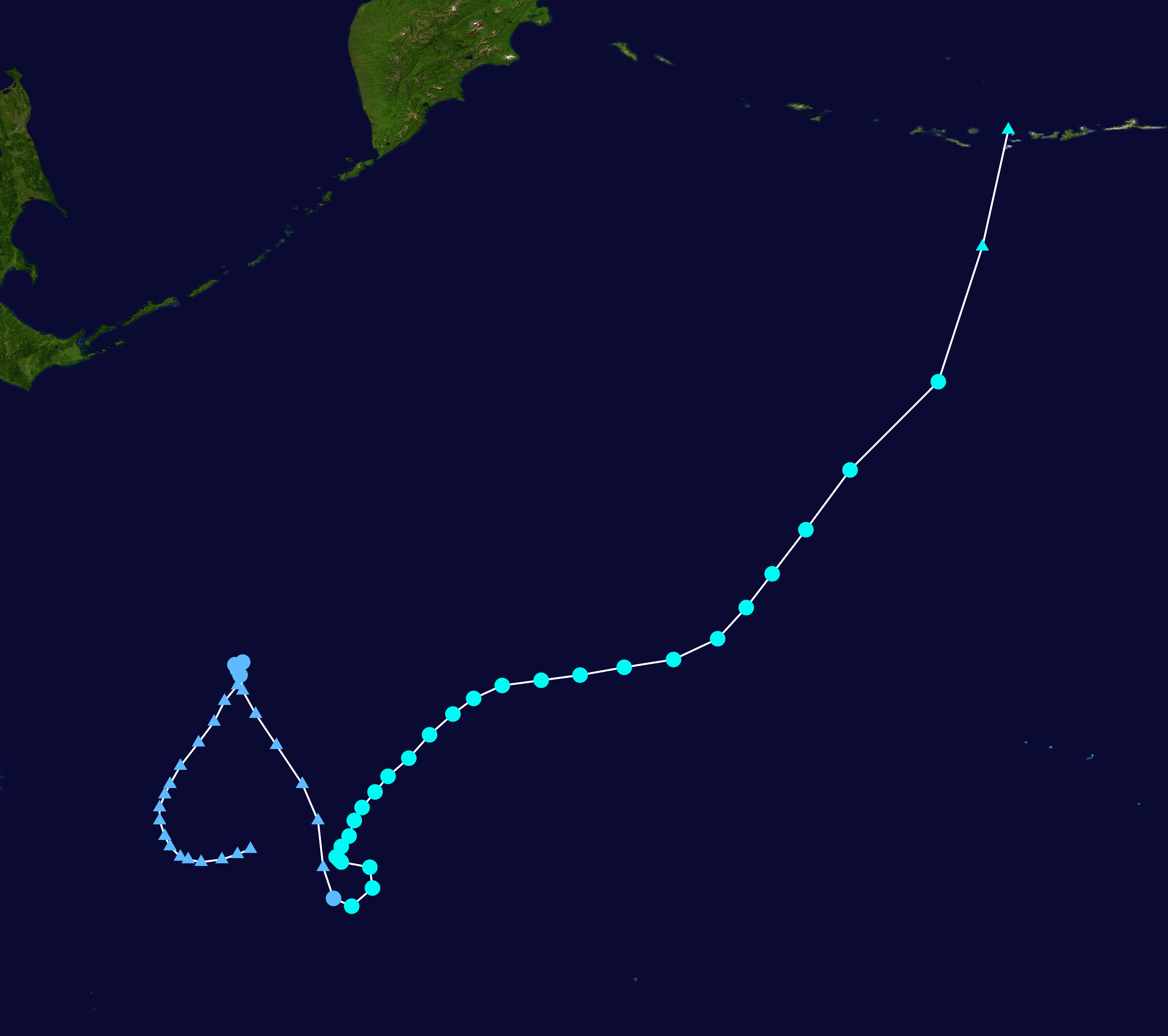
- Duration: July 20 – August 2
- Peak intensity: 75 km/h (45 mph) (10-min); 992 hPa (mbar)

In the middle of July, a mid-level circulation formed within the tropical upper tropospheric trough. The circulation built toward the surface, and by July 20 the system developed a low-level circulation with scattered associated convection. Based on its organization, the Japan Meteorological Agency (JMA) classified the system as a weak tropical depression early on July 20 while located about 820 km (510 mi) northeast of Farallon de Pajaros, the northernmost island in the Northern Mariana Islands. Early development was impeded by the outflow from Typhoon Rosie; after drifting northwestward for 2 days the system turned to the northeast, and by July 24 the influence from Rosie greatly diminished. Accordingly, the organization of the depression quickly increased, and on July 24 the Joint Typhoon Warning Center (JTWC) classified it as Tropical Depression 11W.

A building anticyclone to its northwest forced the depression southeastward. It became steadily less organized, and on July 26 JTWC issued a final warning on the system, believing it to be dissipating. Shortly thereafter, however, the system began re-organizing, and on July 27 the system developed into Tropical Storm Scott. The storm tracked northwestward, then westward, and finally turned to the northeast. Scott gradually strengthened to attain peak winds of 105 km/h (65 mph) on July 29. JMA had upgraded the depression to tropical storm status on July 28, and assessed its peak intensity at 75 km/h (47 mph). Scott maintained its peak intensity for about 12 hours before slowly weakening as it accelerated northeastward. On August 2, the storm merged with an approaching frontal trough, and the following day JMA considered Scott dissipated while located near the Alaskan island of Gareloi. Tropical Storm Scott never affected land. The storm was the only tropical cyclone during the season to not form from the monsoon trough.

=== Typhoon Tina (Huling) ===
- Typhoon (JMA)
- Category 2 typhoon (SSHWS)
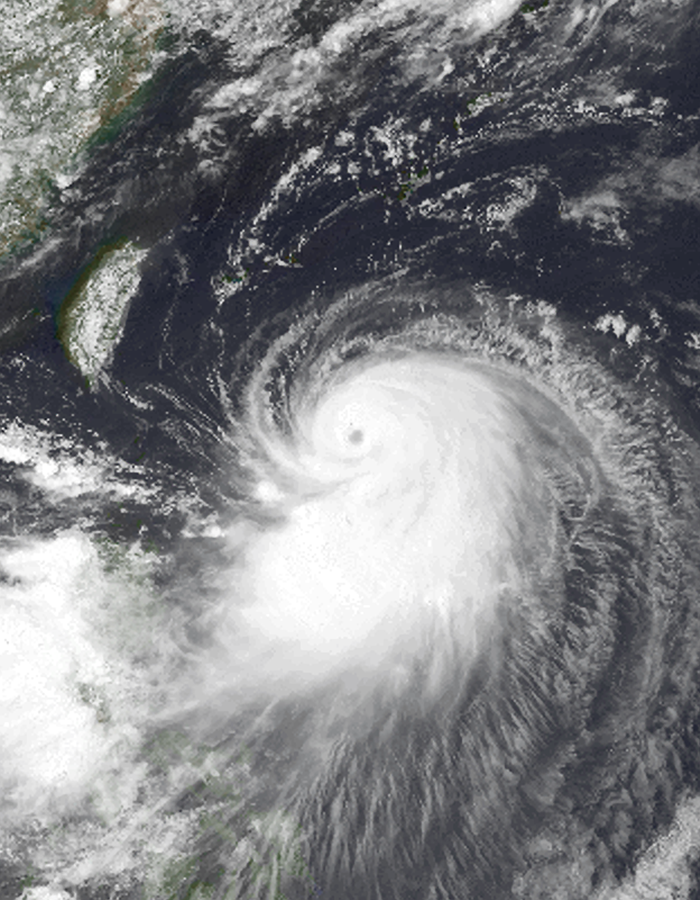
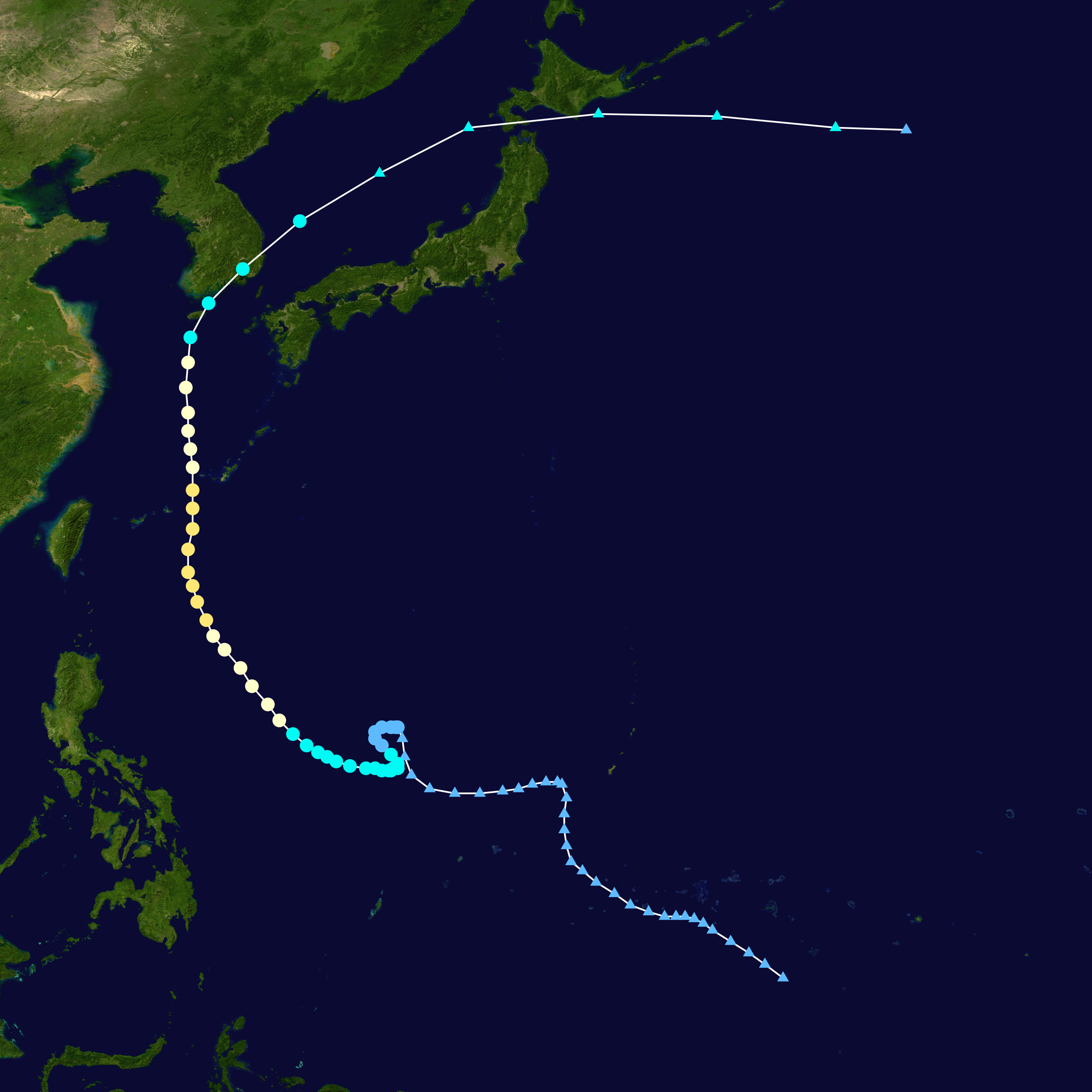
- Duration: July 29 – August 9
- Peak intensity: 140 km/h (85 mph) (10-min); 955 hPa (mbar)

Typhoon Tina, also known as Huling, was a powerful typhoon that formed in the Western Pacific Ocean during the 1997 typhoon season. It intensified rapidly, reaching peak intensity as a Category 2 typhoon with sustained winds of 140 km/h (85 mph). Tina brought heavy rainfall, strong winds, and storm surges to the Philippines, causing widespread damage and flooding. The typhoon resulted in numerous fatalities and significant economic losses. Despite its destructive impact, Tina eventually weakened and dissipated over the open waters of the Pacific Ocean.

From July 31 to August 6, Philippine Atmospheric, Geophysical and Astronomical Services Administration tracked the storm, and named it Huling.

=== Severe Tropical Storm Victor (Goring) ===
- Severe tropical storm (JMA)
- Category 1 typhoon (SSHWS)
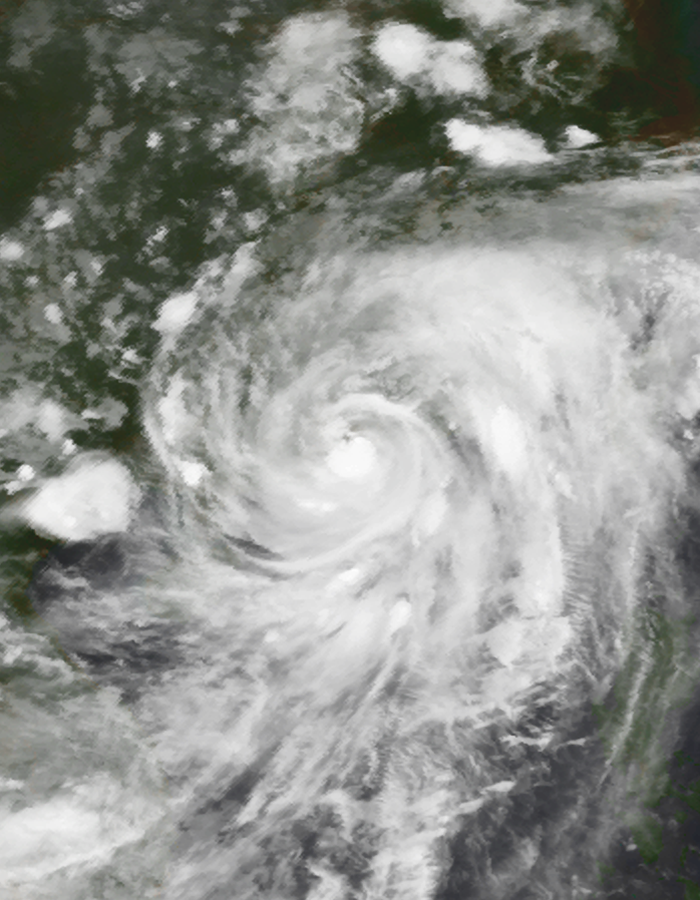
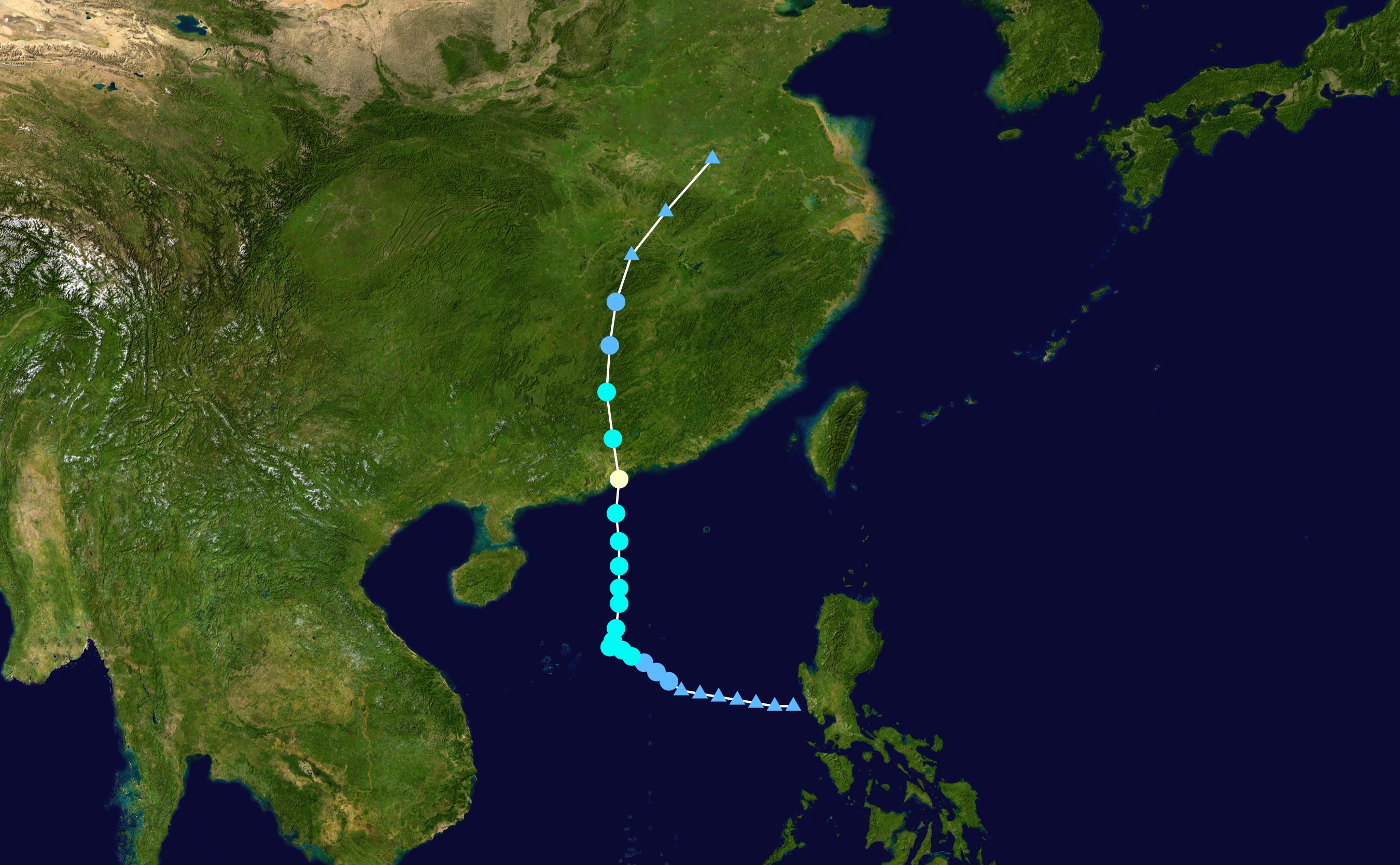
- Duration: July 30 – August 4
- Peak intensity: 110 km/h (70 mph) (10-min); 980 hPa (mbar)

Severe Tropical Storm Victor, also known as Goring, was a powerful tropical cyclone that significantly impacted China in 1997. The storm, tracked by the Philippine Atmospheric, Geophysical and Astronomical Services Administration (PAGASA) from July 30 to 31, 1997, caused widespread devastation. Its destructive force resulted in the tragic loss of 65 lives and economic damages amounting to $241 million. Victor's impact underscores the significant threat posed by tropical cyclones and highlights the importance of preparedness and disaster response measures in affected regions.

=== Typhoon Winnie (Ibiang) ===
- Very strong typhoon (JMA)
- Category 5 super typhoon (SSHWS)
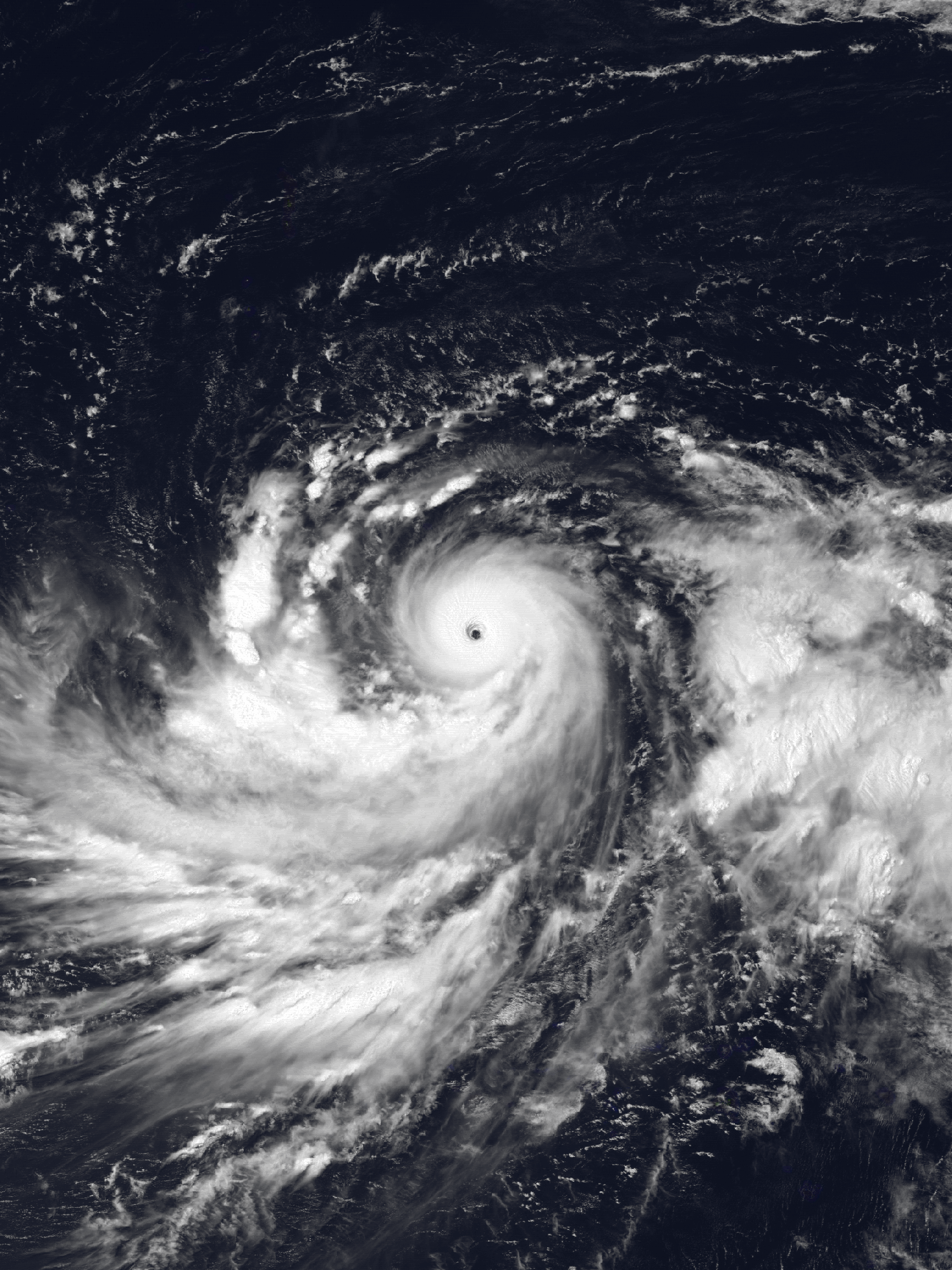
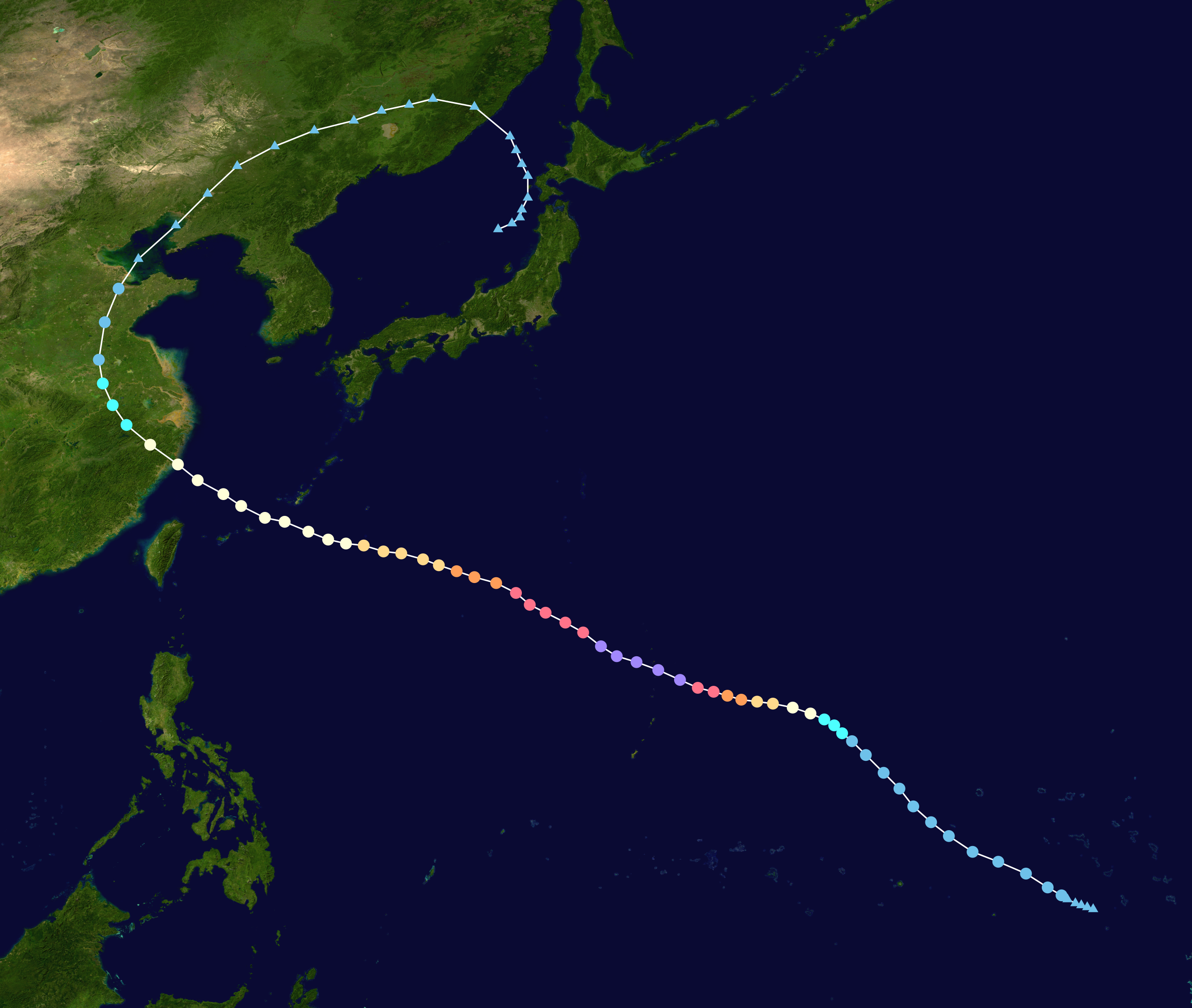
- Duration: August 5 – August 20
- Peak intensity: 185 km/h (115 mph) (10-min); 915 hPa (mbar)

On August 5, an area of low pressure formed near the Marshall Islands, which organized into Tropical Depression 14W on the next day. It headed northwestward, slowly strengthening to a tropical storm on the 9th. Intensification became more rapid as conditions became more favorable, and Winnie reached typhoon strength on the 10th. Two days later, Winnie became the 4th Super Typhoon of the season with peak winds of 160 mph. Soon after, the eye became ragged and large, with an outer eyewall reaching 200 miles in diameter. On the 18th, a minimal Typhoon Winnie passed north of Taiwan and hit eastern China, where it winded down until degenerating into a remnant low on the 20th. The remnant continued northeastward, bringing heavy rain and damage across China until the 23rd. In all, Winnie killed at least 372 people, displaced over 1 million, and caused $3.2 billion in damages.

=== Severe Tropical Storm Yule ===
- Severe tropical storm (JMA)
- Tropical storm (SSHWS)
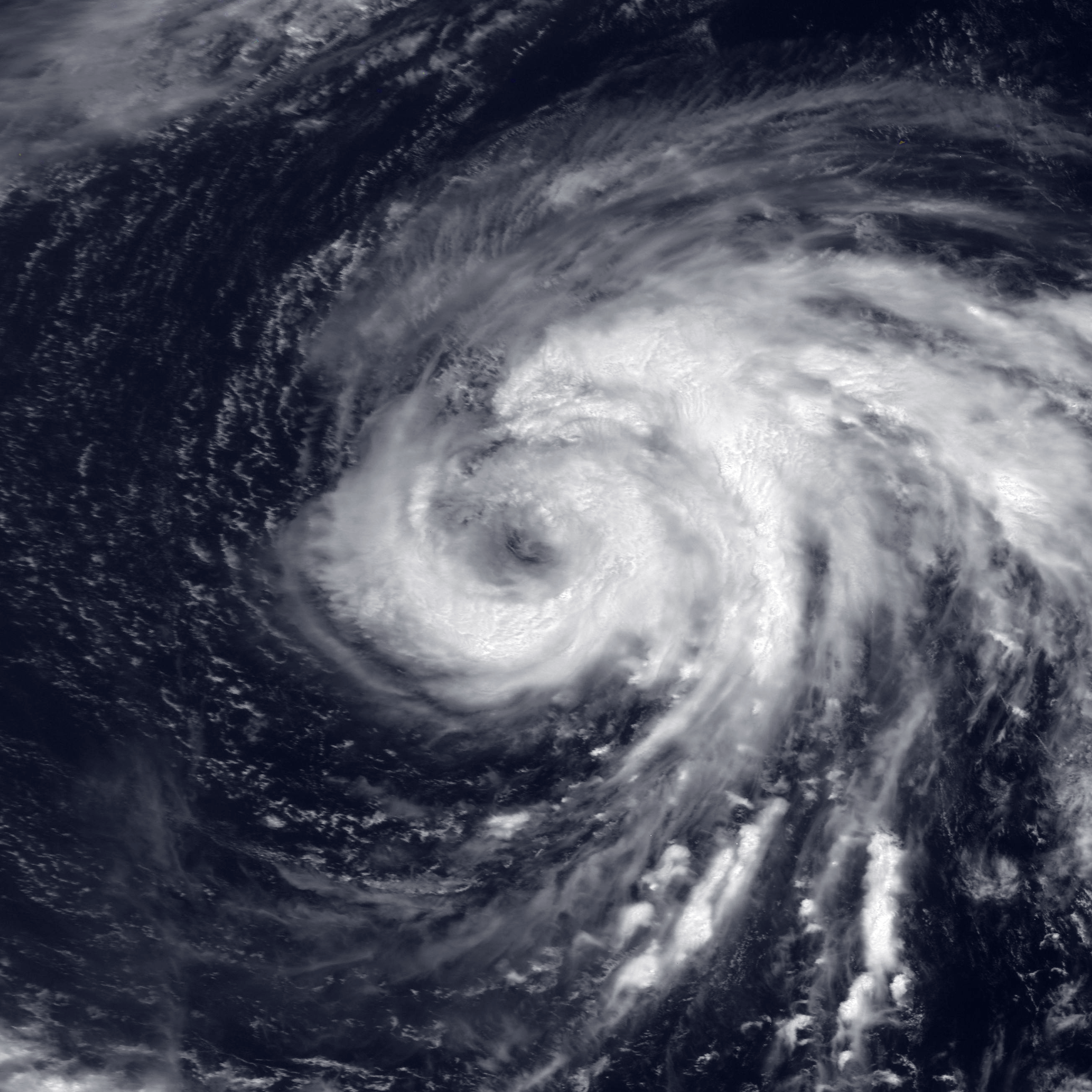
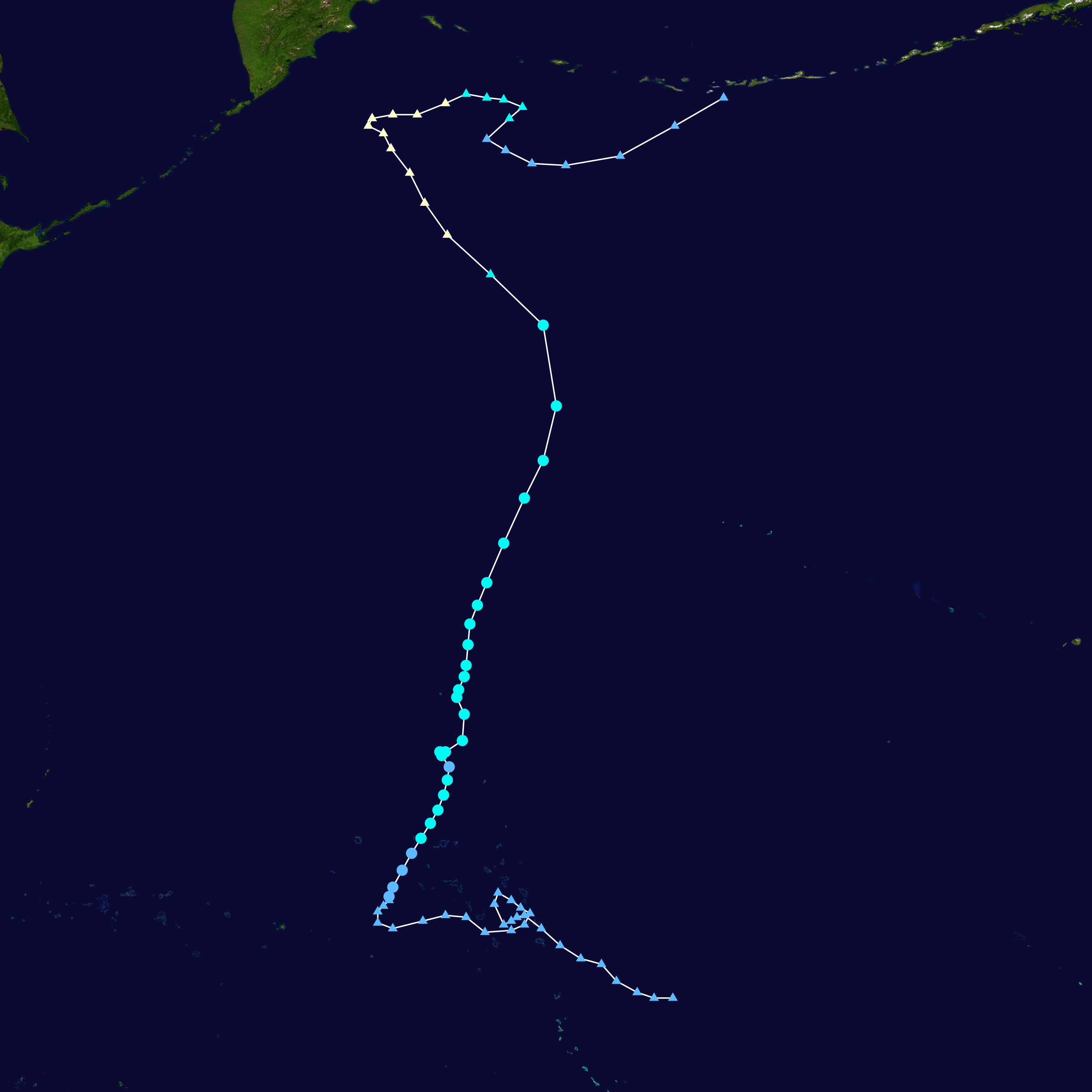
- Duration: August 16 – August 22
- Peak intensity: 100 km/h (65 mph) (10-min); 980 hPa (mbar)

Severe Tropical Storm Yule was a tropical cyclone that formed in the western North Pacific Ocean in August 1997. It was a relatively short-lived storm, lasting only a few days. While it did not cause widespread damage or loss of life, it was a significant weather event in the region. Yule's interaction with another tropical disturbance, Tropical Depression 16W, led to a merger of the two systems, resulting in the dissipation of the depression.

=== Tropical Depression 16W ===
- Tropical depression (SSHWS)
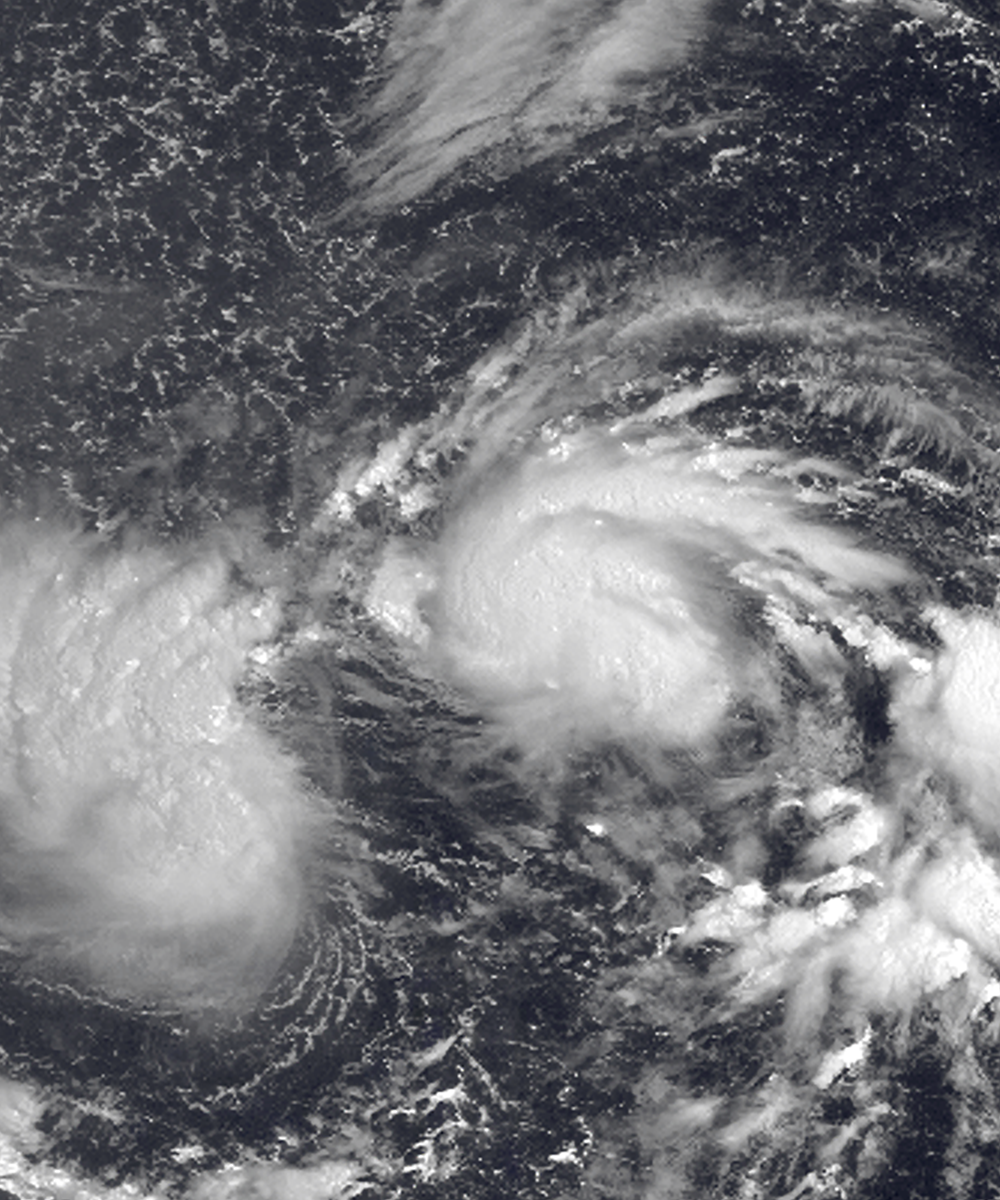
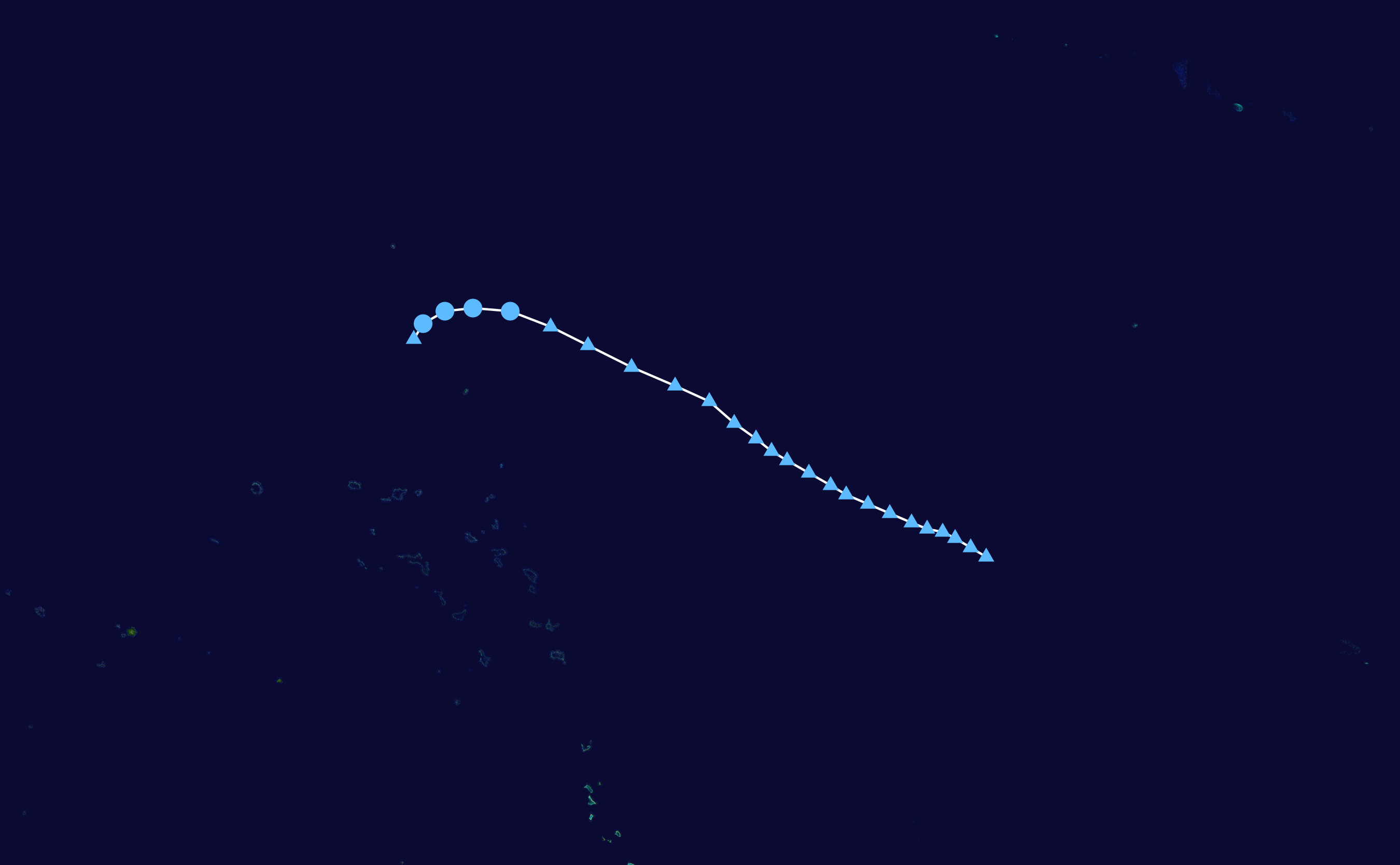
- Duration: August 17 – August 18
- Peak intensity: 55 km/h (35 mph) (1-min); 1004 hPa (mbar)

Tropical Depression 16W developed out of a weak tropical disturbance on August 13. The disturbance was relatively close to another disturbance which would eventually become Severe Tropical storm Yule. By August 17, the disturbance had developed sufficient convection to be declared a tropical depression. However, upon being classified a depression, it was already beginning to be influenced by the nearby Yule. 16W eventually was overcome by Yule and a merger of the two systems took place on August 19, leading to the dissipation of the depression.

=== Severe Tropical Storm Zita (Luming) ===
- Severe tropical storm (JMA)
- Category 1 typhoon (SSHWS)
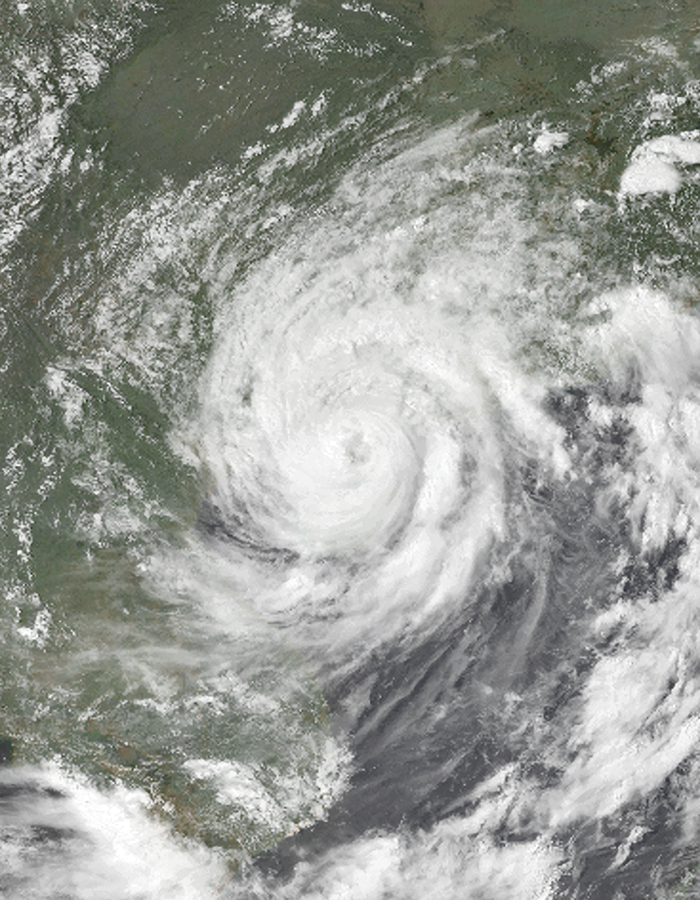
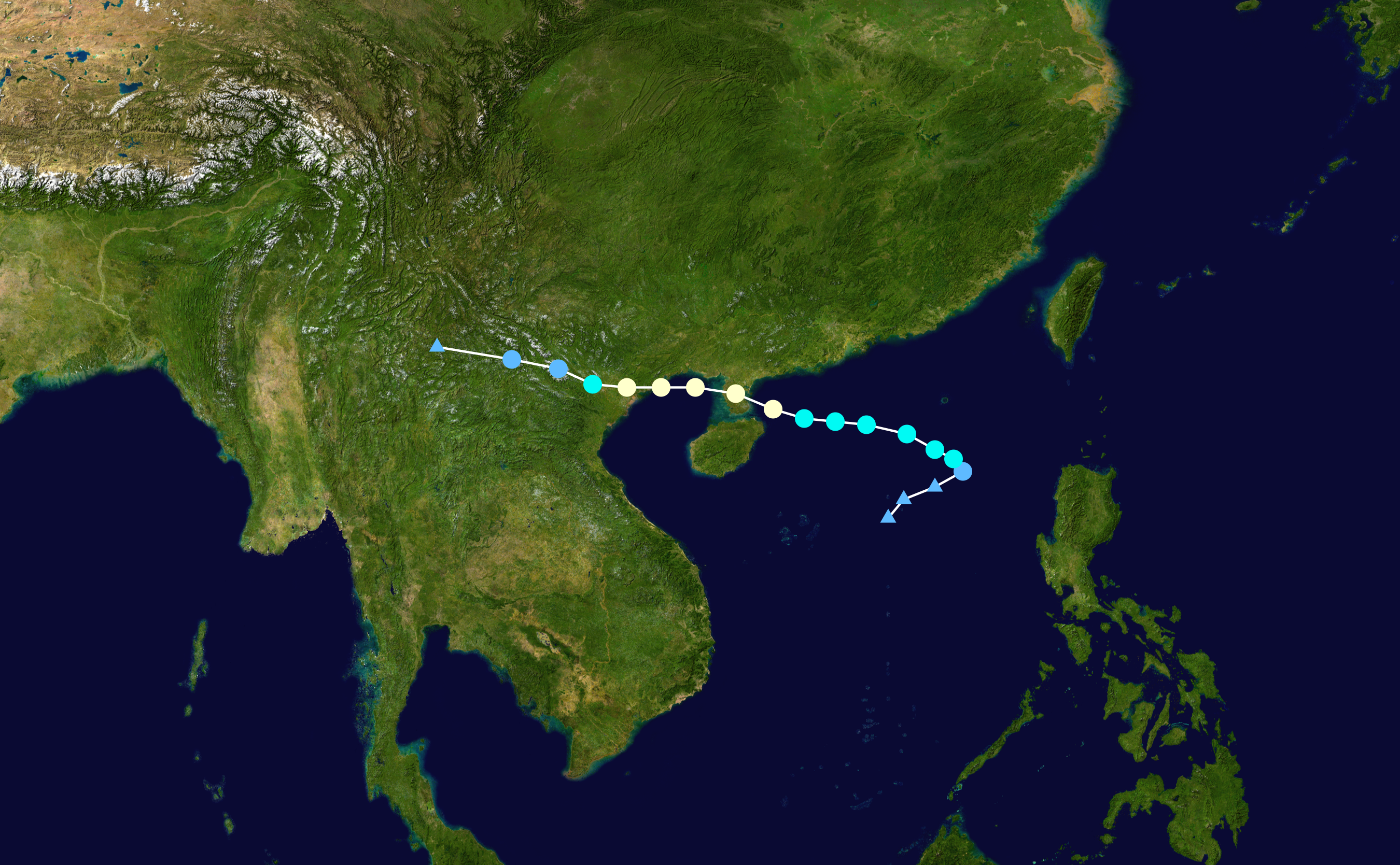
- Duration: August 20 – August 24
- Peak intensity: 100 km/h (65 mph) (10-min); 980 hPa (mbar)

Originating from a tropical disturbance over the South China Sea on August 19, Zita tracked westward as it quickly strengthened within a region of light wind shear, attaining winds of 140 km/h (87 mph) as it made landfall along the Leizhou Peninsula early on August 22. Maintaining this intensity, the storm made a second landfall in northern Vietnam later that day before rapidly weakening over land. The remnants of Zita were last noted over extreme northwestern Vietnam on August 24. Early in its existence, the storm was monitored by PAGASA and was designated with the local name Luming. Throughout Zita's path, seven people were killed and $438 million was wrought in damage, nearly all of which took place in China.

=== Typhoon Amber (Miling) ===
- Typhoon (JMA)
- Category 3 typhoon (SSHWS)
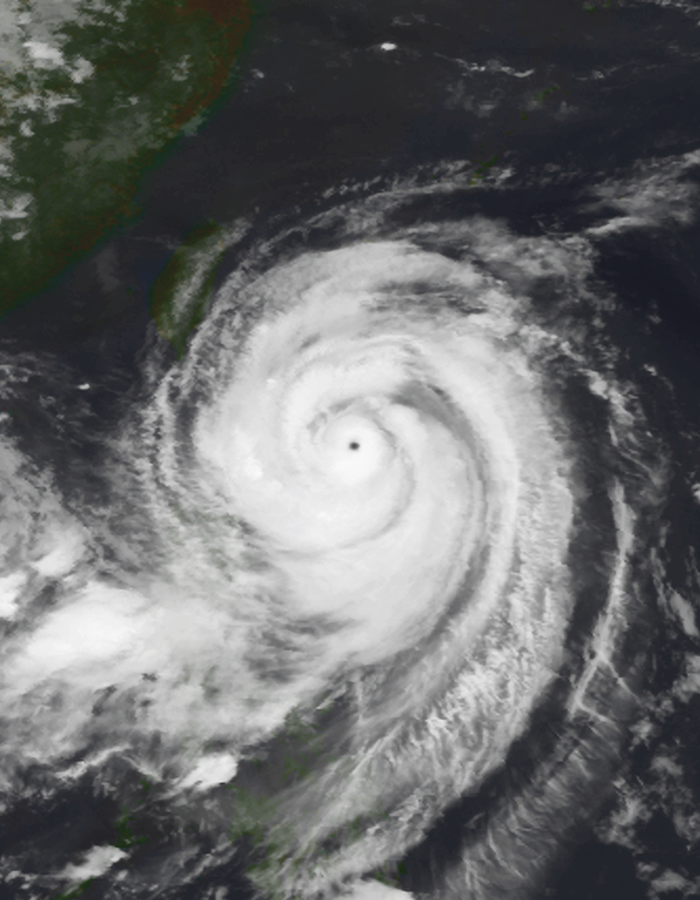
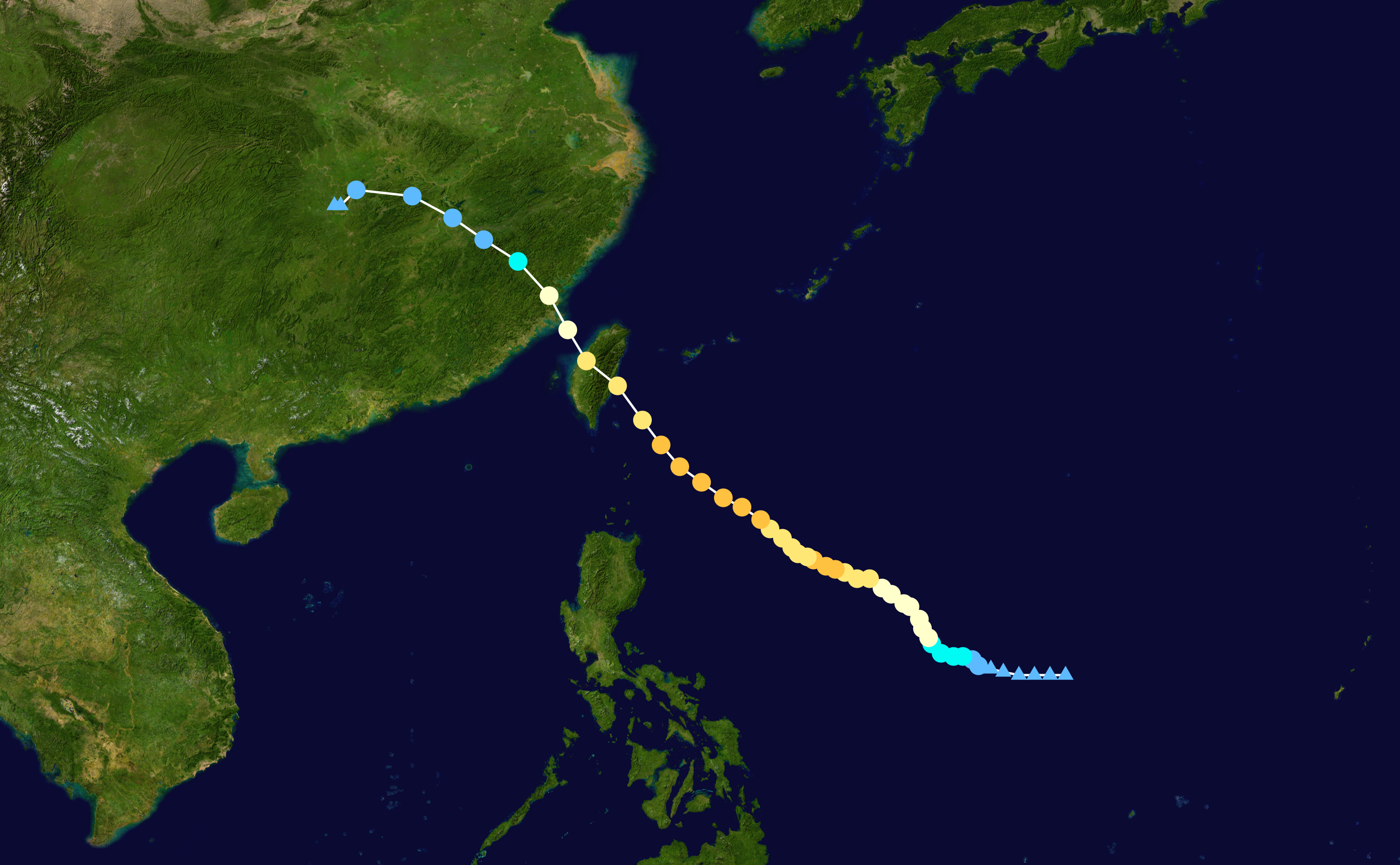
- Duration: August 21 – August 31
- Peak intensity: 150 km/h (90 mph) (10-min); 950 hPa (mbar)

Typhoon Amber was the eighteenth tropical cyclone of the season. The tropical depression initially tracked slowly west-northwest between the subtropical ridge and Typhoon Zita and developed at a faster than normal pace. By August 26, Tropical Storm Cass formed to the west-southwest, which accelerated Amber's forward motion to the northwest due to a Fujiwhara interaction. It underwent eyewall replacement cycles from August 25 through August 27, and tracked across Taiwan/Taipei with maximum sustained winds of 95 knots, then through the Formosa Strait into China as a minimal typhoon. On August 30, Amber completely absorbed Cass, in inland China, before degenerating into a remnant low, and dissipating as well, later on that day. Damages from Typhoon Amber amounted to $52 million.

Throughout much of its duration, Philippine Atmospheric, Geophysical and Astronomical Services Administration tracked the storm, and named it Miling.

=== Typhoon Bing ===
- Very strong typhoon (JMA)
- Category 4 super typhoon (SSHWS)
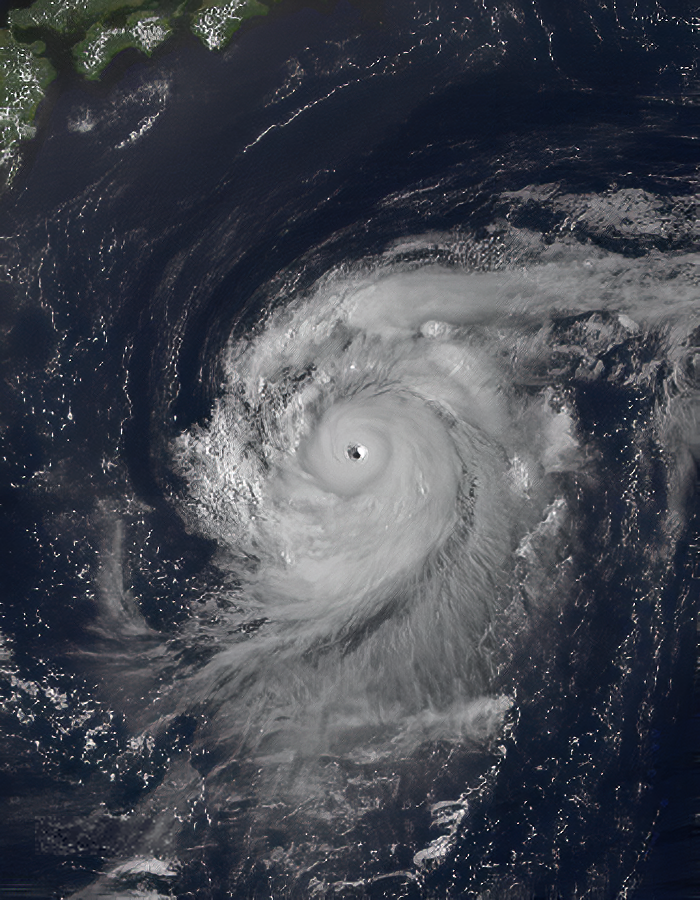
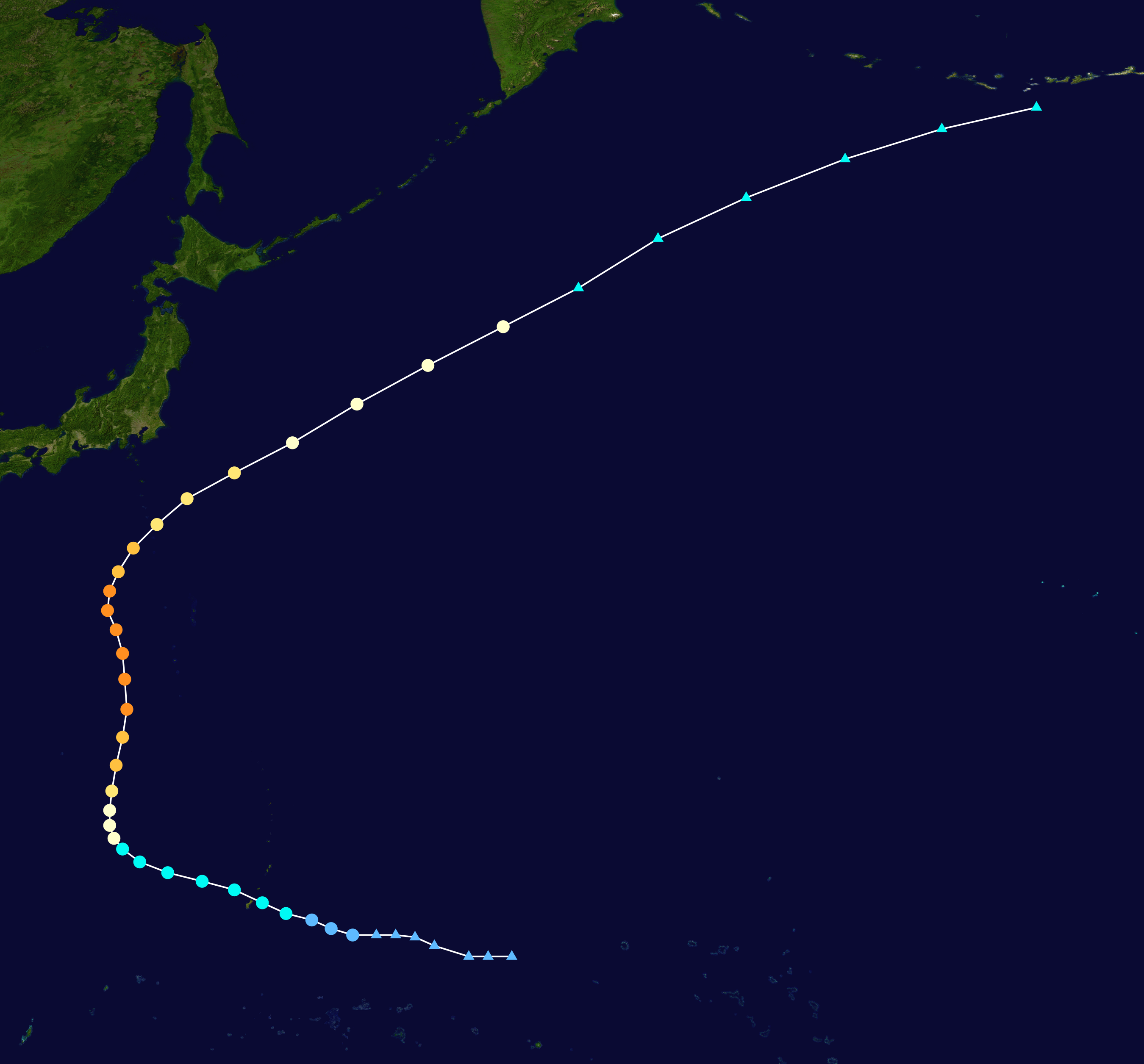
- Duration: August 26 – September 4
- Peak intensity: 155 km/h (100 mph) (10-min); 940 hPa (mbar)

As a tropical storm, Bing tracked through the Mariana Islands and produced torrential rains. Following previous heavy rains earlier in the month, a maximum of 6.17 in (157 mm) at Andersen Air Force Base on Guam and 5.19 in (132 mm) on Tiyan. A landslide in Santa Rita caused significant structural damage. By September 1, Bing bypassed the Bonin Islands. Sustained winds reached 55 km/h (34 mph) and gusts peaked at 75 km/h (47 mph). The extratropical remnants of Bing brought heavy rain to the Aleutian Islands between September 6 and 7. Winds also gusted in excess of 95 km/h (59 mph) in some areas.

=== Tropical Storm Cass ===
- Tropical storm (JMA)
- Tropical storm (SSHWS)
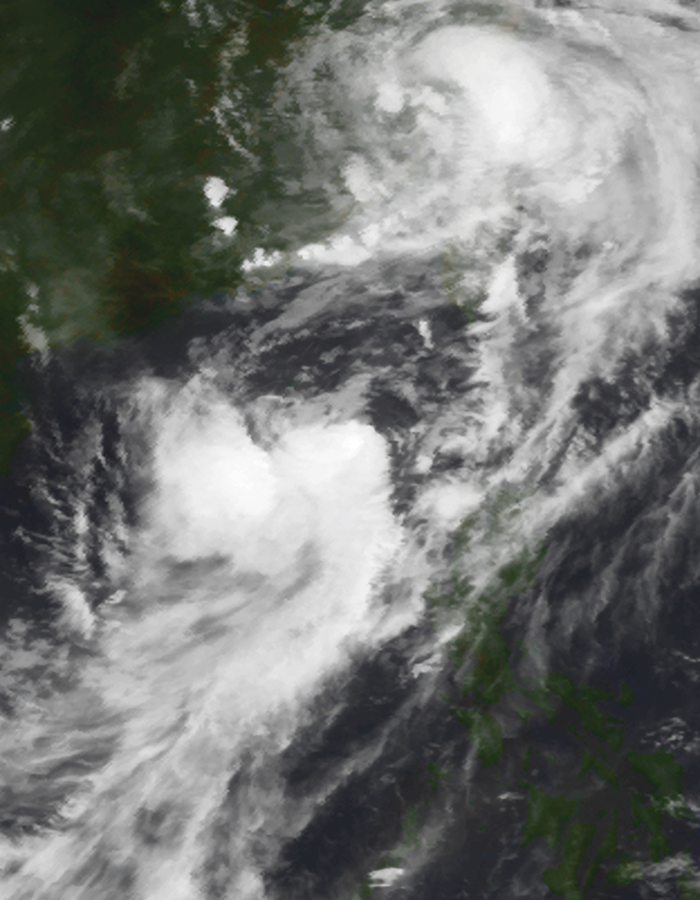
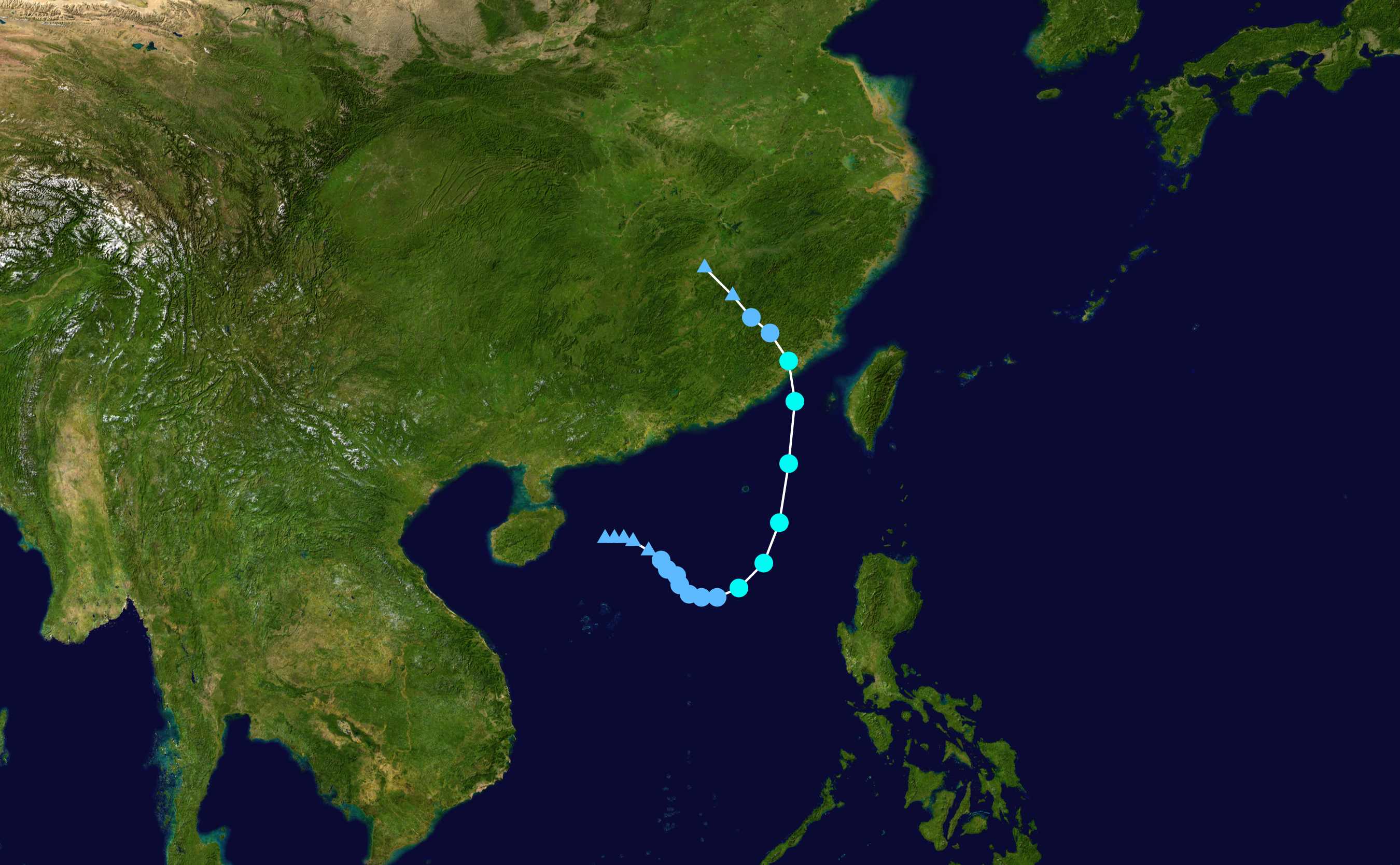
- Duration: August 27 – August 30
- Peak intensity: 85 km/h (50 mph) (10-min); 992 hPa (mbar)

On August 25, a low-pressure area developed in the South China Sea, west of the Philippines, associated with the dissipating convection of Tropical Storm Zita. The low-pressure area then started to strengthen, and slowly became a Tropical Depression on August 28. The system failed to strengthen for a while, due to a much stronger system just east of Cass, Typhoon Amber. However, Typhoon Amber soon started to move north, just a little farther from Cass, but was just enough for Cass to strengthen into a Tropical Storm. As the nearby Typhoon Amber started to make landfall over Taiwan, a strong southern inflow from Typhoon Amber pulled Cass northwards, in an effect known as the Fujiwhara effect. As Typhoon Amber made landfall, and moved inland over eastern China, Cass was pulled very close to Typhoon Amber, while Cass was maintaining Tropical Storm strength. This severely weakened the storm, as it made landfall on August 30. Cass was then absorbed by Typhoon Amber, shortly afterwards, in inland China.

=== Typhoon Oliwa ===
- Very strong typhoon (JMA)
- Category 5 super typhoon (SSHWS)
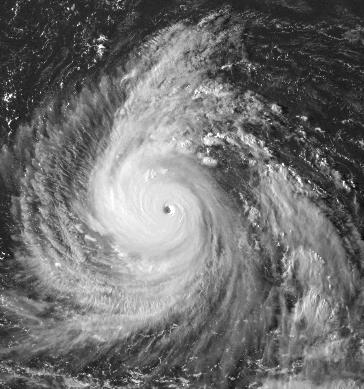
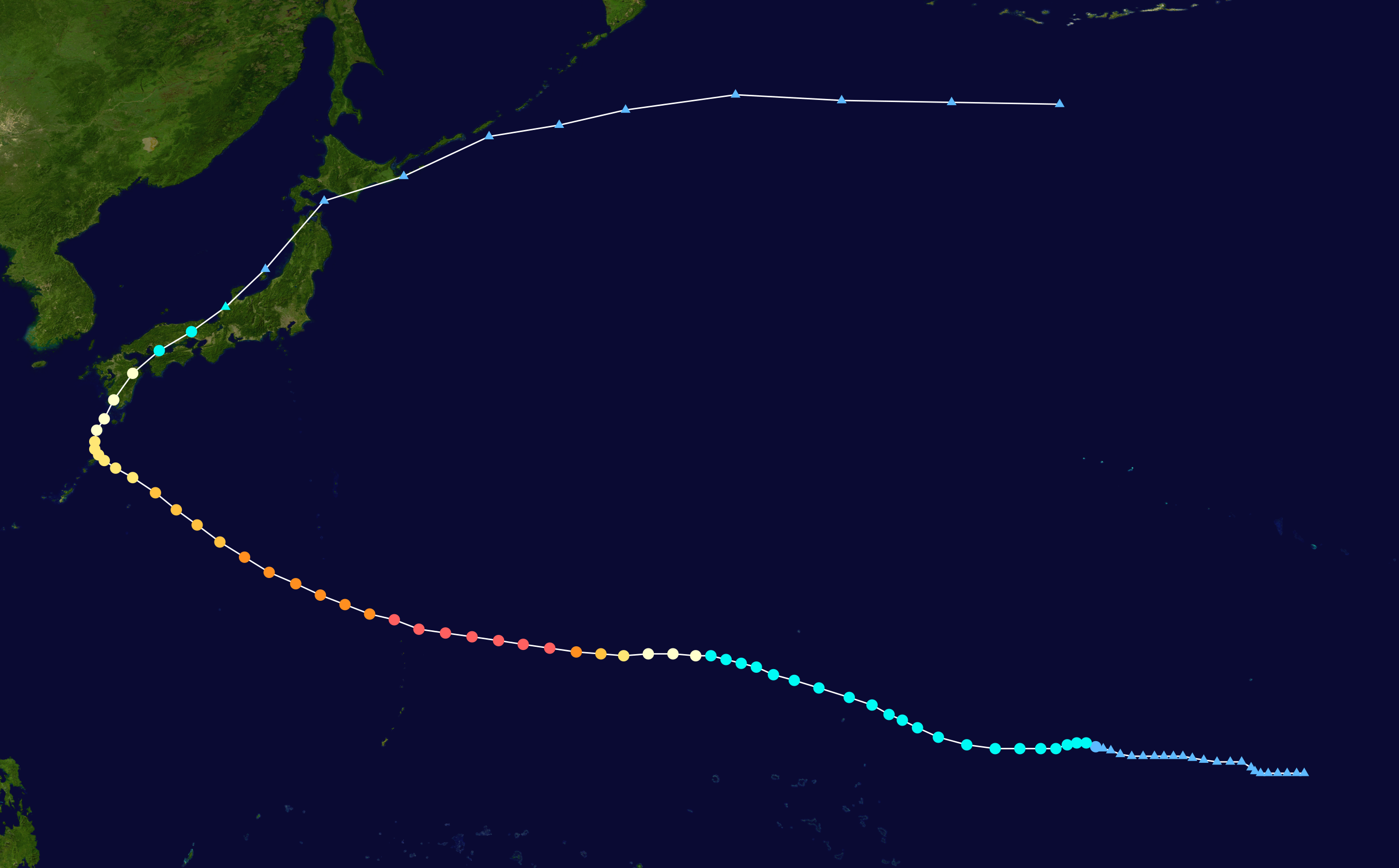
- Duration: September 3 – September 16
- Peak intensity: 185 km/h (115 mph) (10-min); 915 hPa (mbar)

On September 2, the monsoon formed into Tropical Depression Two-C in the Central Pacific. It headed slowly westward, becoming a tropical storm on September 3. Later that day, Oliwa crossed the International Date Line, and continued to slowly strengthen to become a typhoon on September 8. Oliwa rapidly strengthened on September 9 to reach a peak of 160 mph winds; the sixth Super Typhoon of the year. Oliwa slowly weakened as it moved westward, and hit Japan on September 15 and September 16. In Japan, severe flooding from the typhoon killed 12 people and displaced 30,000 others. 10 people were reported missing but are possibly dead. On September 17, the JTWC issued the final advisory on Oliwa while it was in the eastern portion of the Sea of Japan. The storm then crossed northern Japan, and it accelerated over the open Pacific Ocean, where it dissipated on September 19, near the International Date Line to the south of the Aleutian Islands.

=== Typhoon David ===
- Very strong typhoon (JMA)
- Category 2 typhoon (SSHWS)
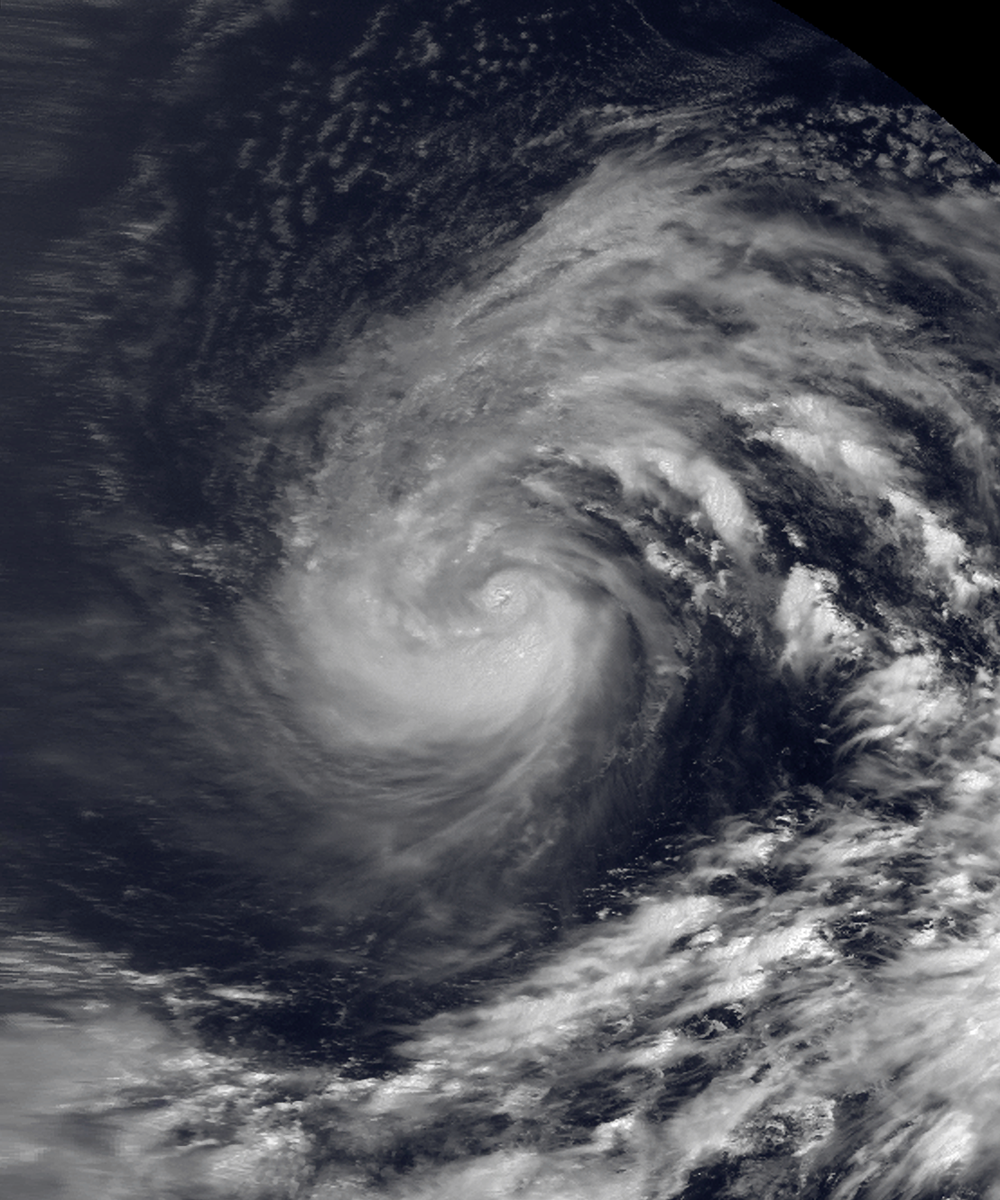
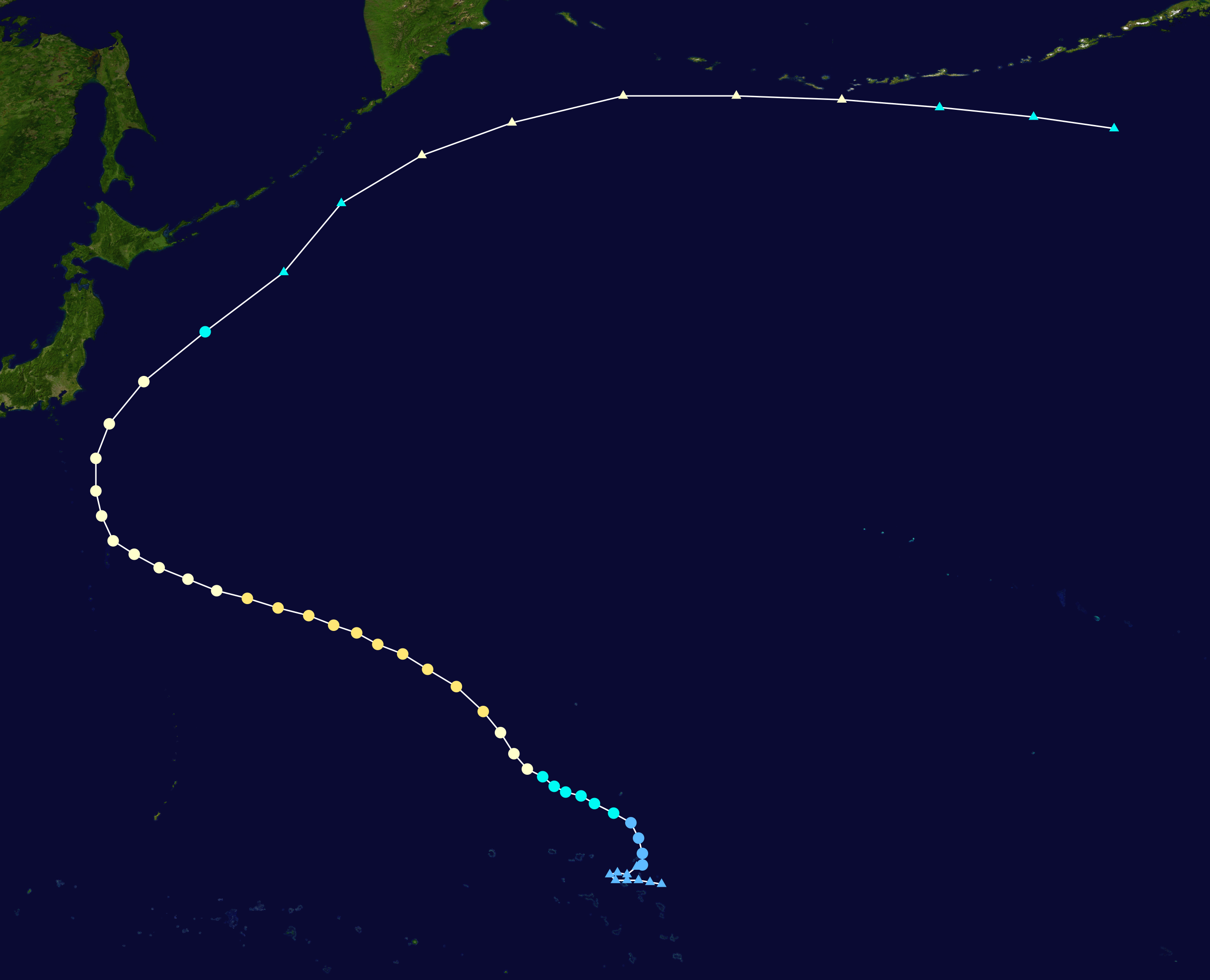
- Duration: September 11 – September 19
- Peak intensity: 155 km/h (100 mph) (10-min); 945 hPa (mbar)

The disturbance which developed into Typhoon David was first noted on September 9, in a monsoon trough northeast of Kwajalein. Post-analysis later demonstrated that the system reached tropical depression intensity on September 10. On the morning of September 15, it attained its maximum intensity of 110 mph (175 km/h). The typhoon passed near Minami-Tori-shima with sustained winds of 75 mph (120 km/h) on September 16, and then, after weakening to tropical storm strength, passed near Chichijima two days later. During this time the cyclone turned toward the northeast, making its closest approach to Honshu on September 19. JTWC issued its final warning on September 20, as the system transitioned to an extratropical low while en route to the Gulf of Alaska.

=== Tropical Depression Ella ===
- Tropical depression (JMA)
- Tropical storm (SSHWS)
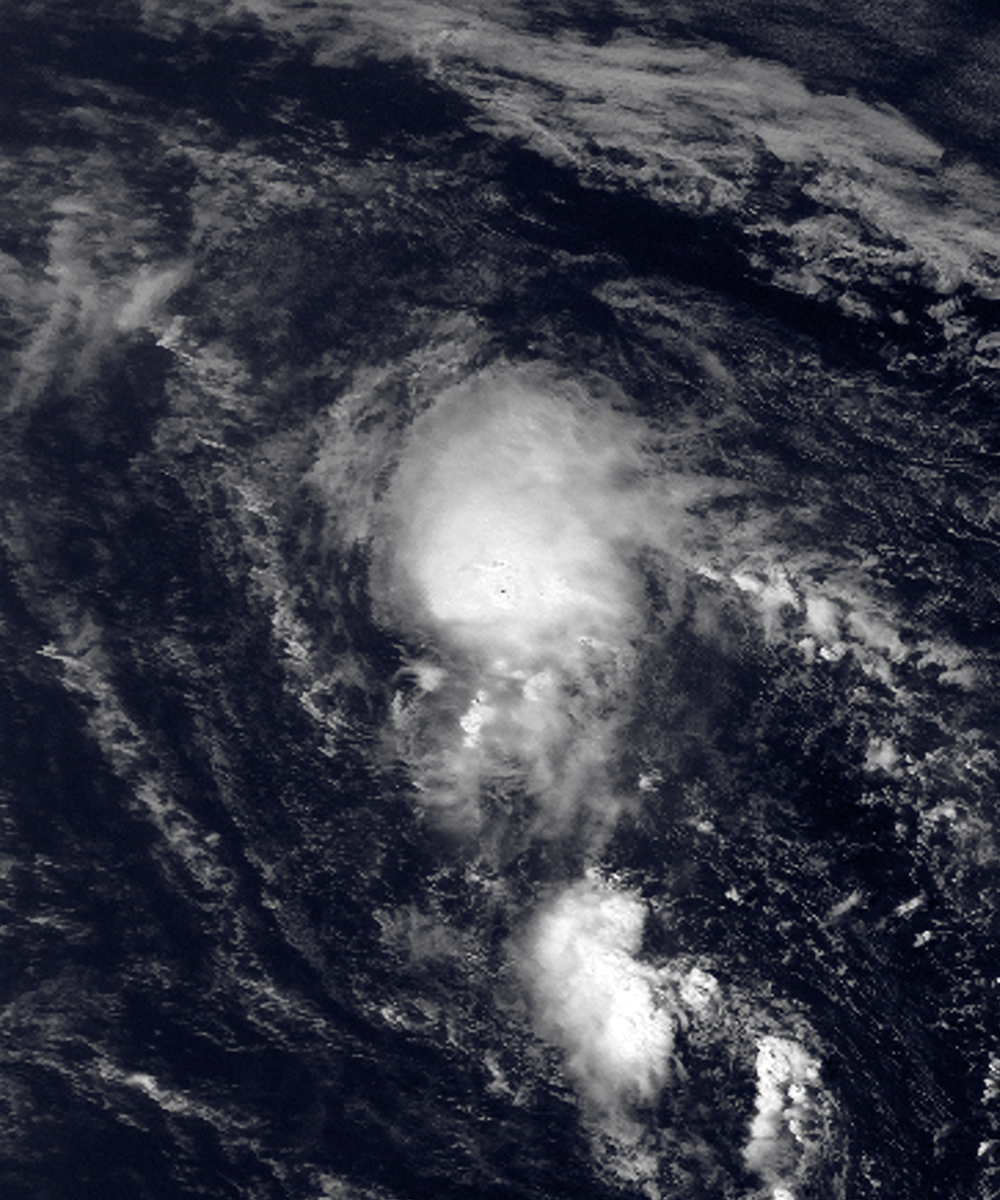
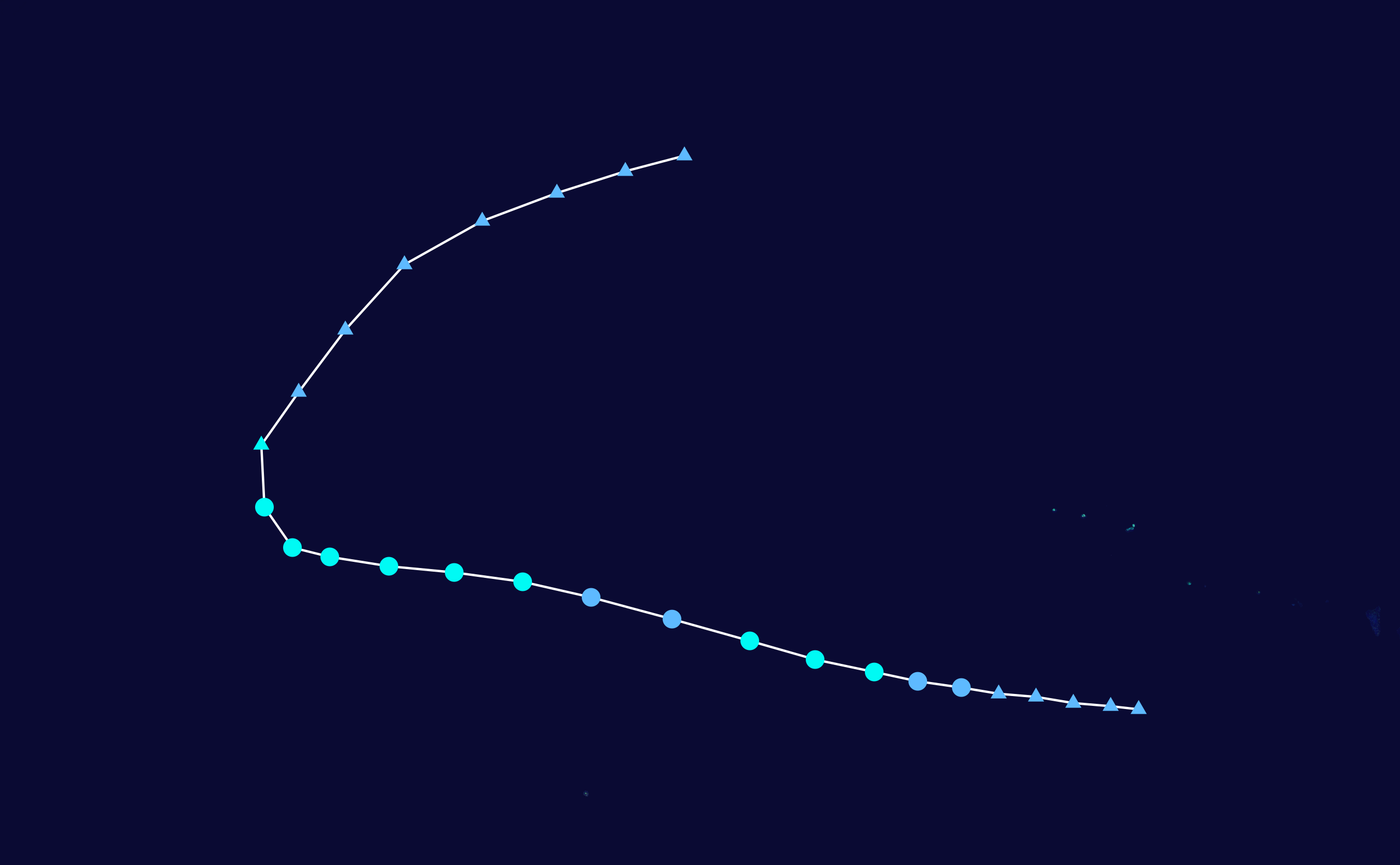
- Duration: September 20 – September 24
- Peak intensity: 55 km/h (35 mph) (10-min); 1002 hPa (mbar)

Tropical Depression Ella was a short-lived tropical cyclone that formed in the western North Pacific Ocean in September 1997. It originated as a small, disorganized system east of the International Date Line and gradually intensified into a tropical depression. Despite its brief existence, Ella tracked westward and then recurved northeastward before dissipating over open waters. The system posed no significant threat to land areas and did not cause any notable damage or loss of life.

=== Severe Tropical Storm Fritz ===
- Severe tropical storm (JMA)
- Category 1 typhoon (SSHWS)
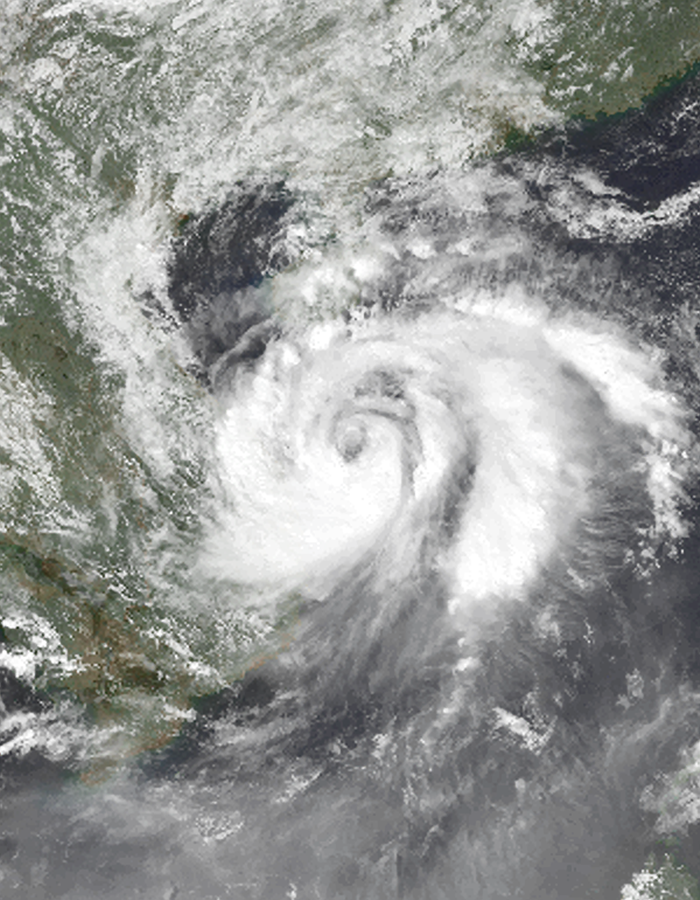
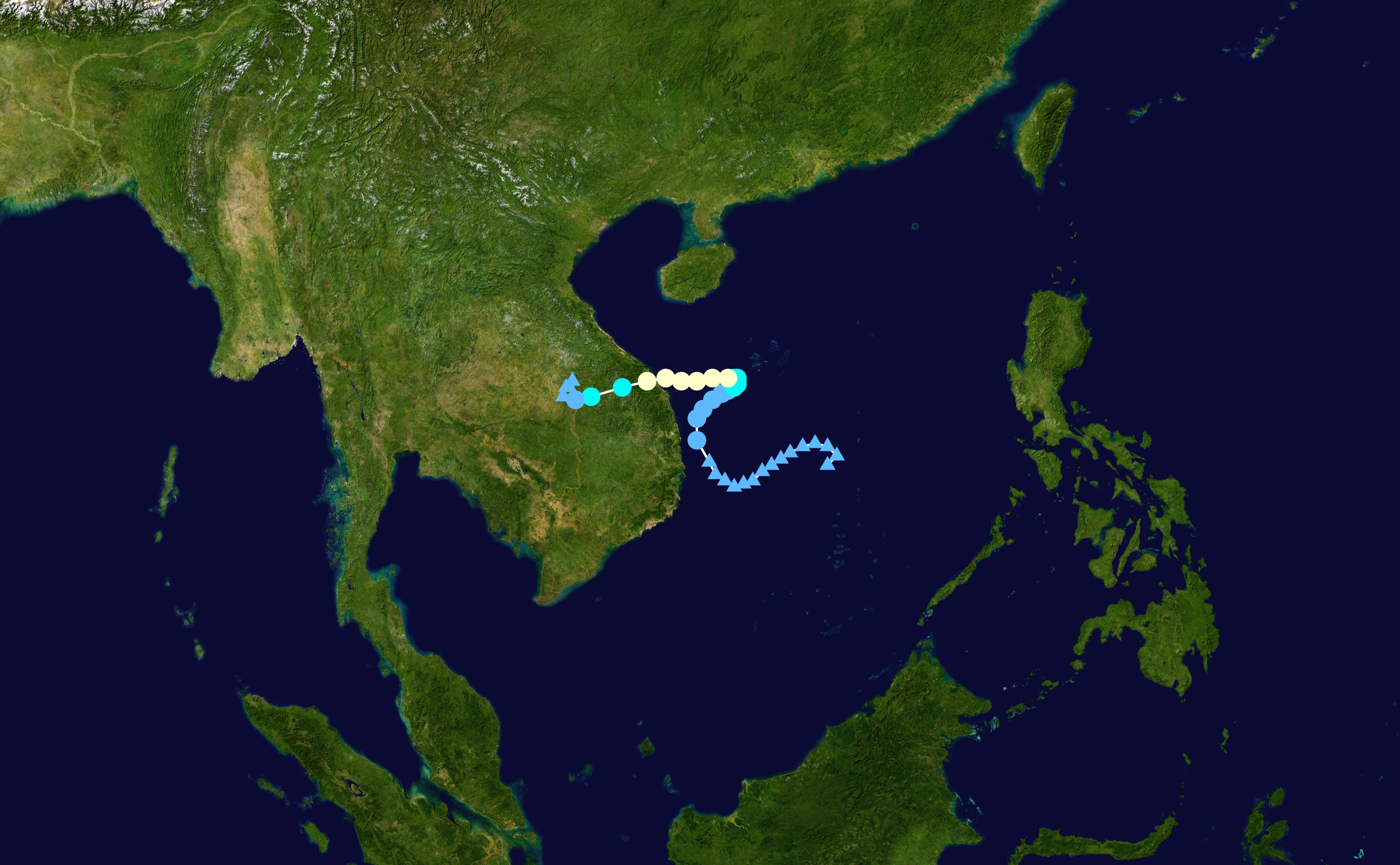
- Duration: September 21 – September 27
- Peak intensity: 100 km/h (65 mph) (10-min); 980 hPa (mbar)

During mid-September, a monsoonal trough developed in the South China Sea. Deep convection developed near the periphery of the low level circulation before rapidly consolidating near the center on September 20. At this time, the JTWC classified the system as Tropical Depression 22W while situated near the coast of Vietnam. Due to the proximity to land, the system struggled to develop until it turned sharply to the east on September 22.

In Vietnam, Fritz killed 28 people and caused $5.1 million in damages.

=== Typhoon Ginger ===
- Very strong typhoon (JMA)
- Category 5 super typhoon (SSHWS)
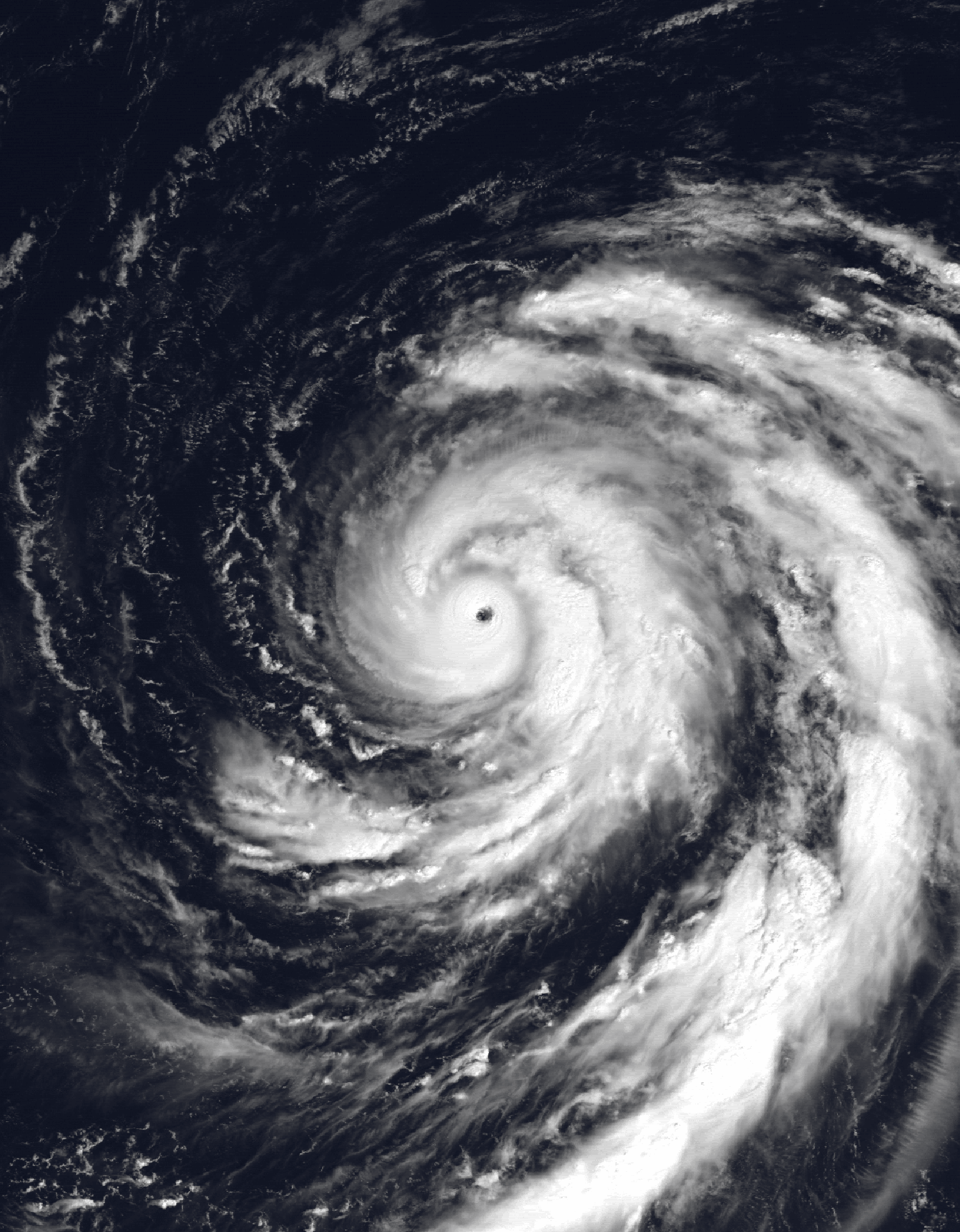
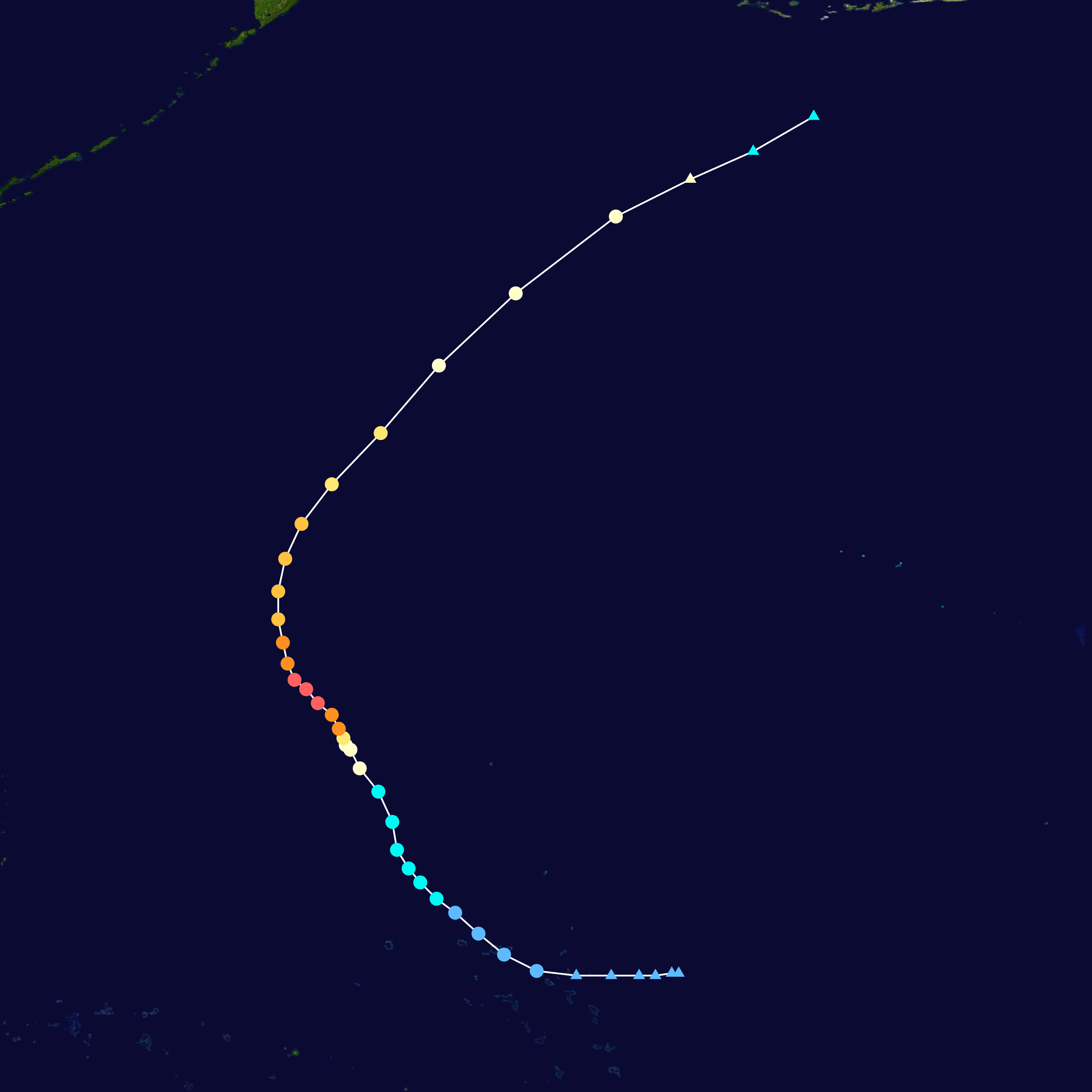
- Duration: September 23 – September 30
- Peak intensity: 175 km/h (110 mph) (10-min); 925 hPa (mbar)

Typhoon Ginger originated from a low-latitude tropical disturbance near the International Date Line on September 21. The following day, deep convection consolidated around a low-level circulation center and banding features formed around the system. At 0530 UTC, the JTWC issued a Tropical Cyclone Formation Alert for the system. Later that day, the system was designated as Tropical Depression 24W. Tracking in a more northerly direction, the depression intensified into a tropical storm the next day, at which time it was given the name Ginger. Continued strengthening occurred at a climatological rate until it was upgraded to a typhoon on September 25. Upon becoming a typhoon, Ginger underwent a period of explosive development.

During this period, the storm intensified into a Category 5 super typhoon, with winds reaching 265 km/h (165 mph) by 0000 UTC on September 27. At this time, Ginger featured a small, well-defined eye surrounded by a smooth central dense overcast and large convective feeder bands. The general cloudless environment surrounding the system allowed outflow to cover a large area. Shortly after peaking, the storm began to recurve towards the northeast and weaken. Gradually accelerating, the storm began to undergo an extratropical transition. The JTWC issued their final advisory on the typhoon at 0600 UTC on September 30. Several hours later, the extratropical system weakened below typhoon intensity. The remnants of Ginger persisted for two more days as it rapidly tracked towards the Western United States. By October 2, the storm impacted the region and dissipated shortly thereafter.

The remnants of Typhoon Ginger brought strong winds and heavy rain to the Western United States. Winds along the Oregon coastline gusted up to 69 mph (111 km/h). The highest rainfall total was recorded in Felida, Washington at 1.3 in (33 mm). Power was also briefly cut to 450 people by the high winds.

=== Tropical Depression Hank ===
- Tropical depression (JMA)
- Tropical storm (SSHWS)
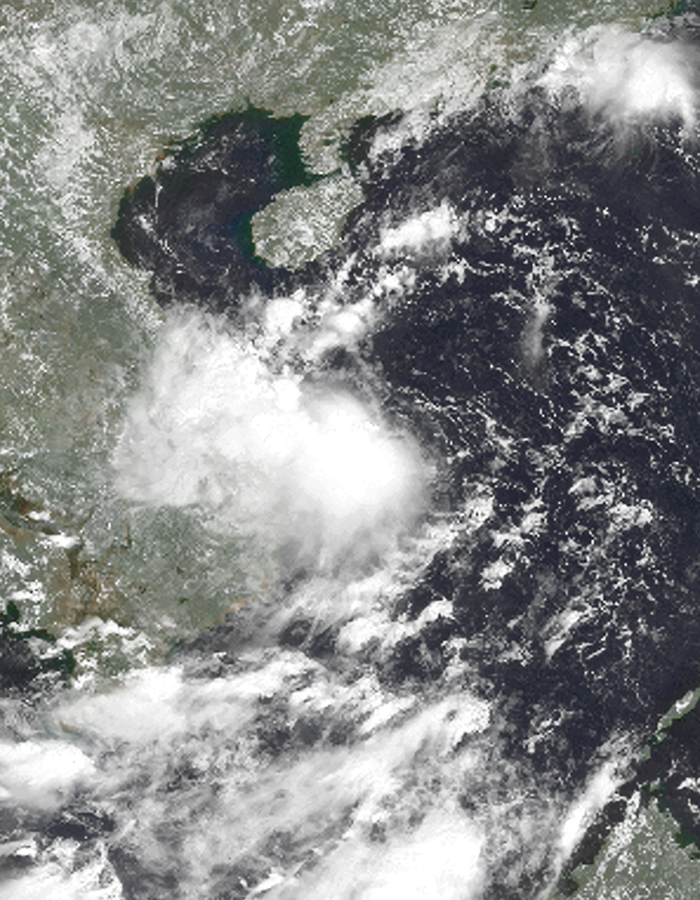
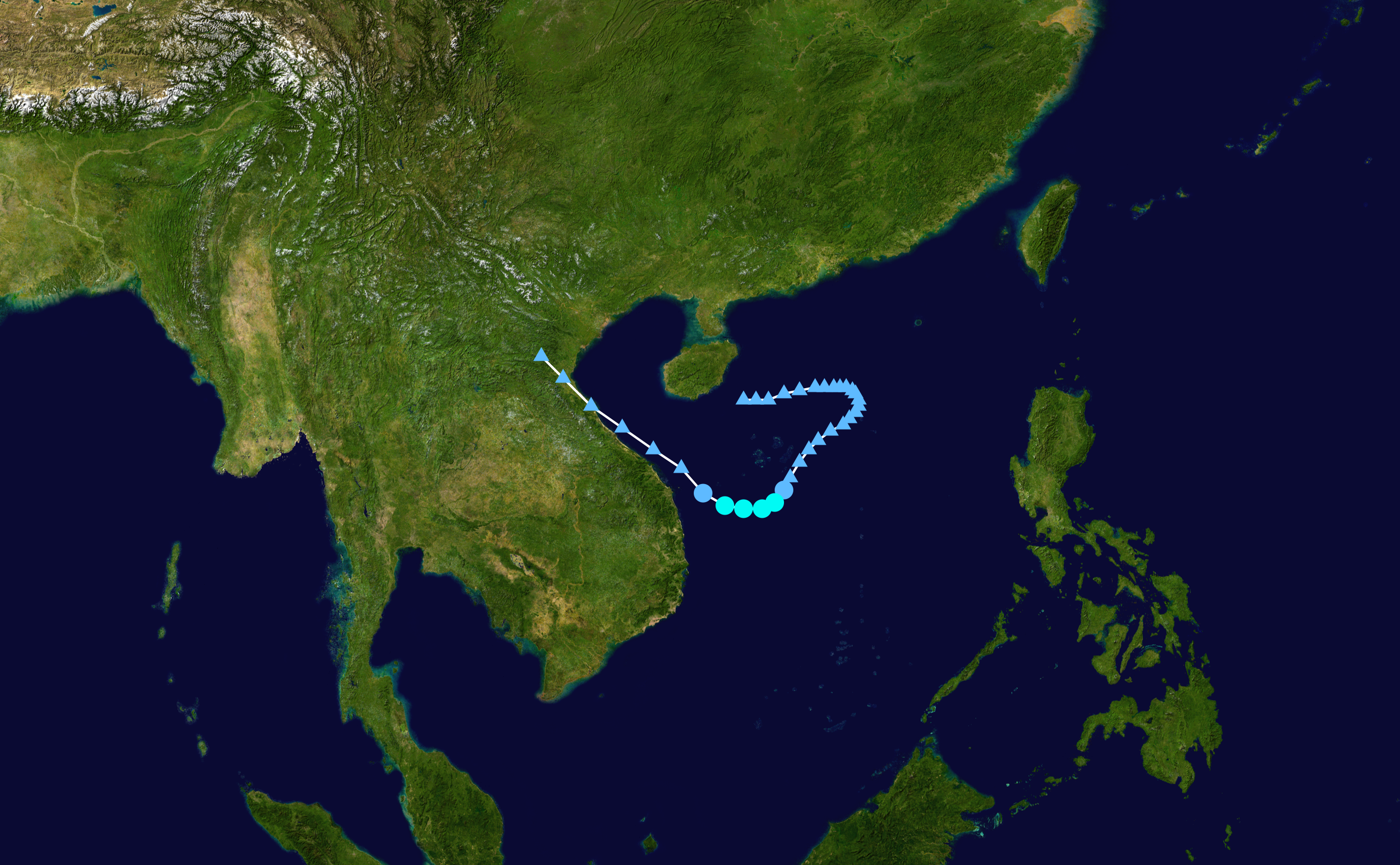
- Duration: September 28 – October 4
- Peak intensity: 55 km/h (35 mph) (10-min); 1004 hPa (mbar)

Tropical Storm Hank originated out of an area of low pressure over the South China Sea in late September. Minimal convection was associated with the system and only light winds were recorded. Over the following days, the system gradually organized and by October 3, the JTWC issued a TCFA for the system. However, in post-storm analysis, it was found that Hank was already a tropical storm by this time. By the time the TCFA was issued, Hank reached its peak intensity with winds of 75 km/h (47 mph) before succumbing to strong wind shear. Late on October 3, Hank weakened to a tropical depression and was initially thought to have made landfall; however, satellite analysis showed that the center did not cross land until October 5, shortly before dissipating. There were no reports of damage in relation to the storm.

=== Tropical Depression 26W ===
- Tropical depression (SSHWS)
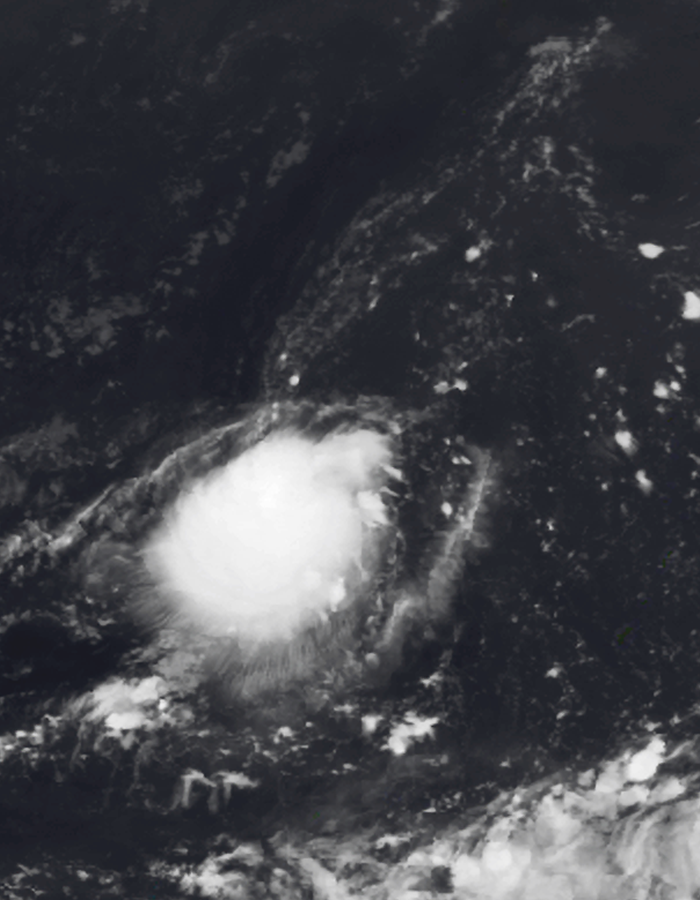
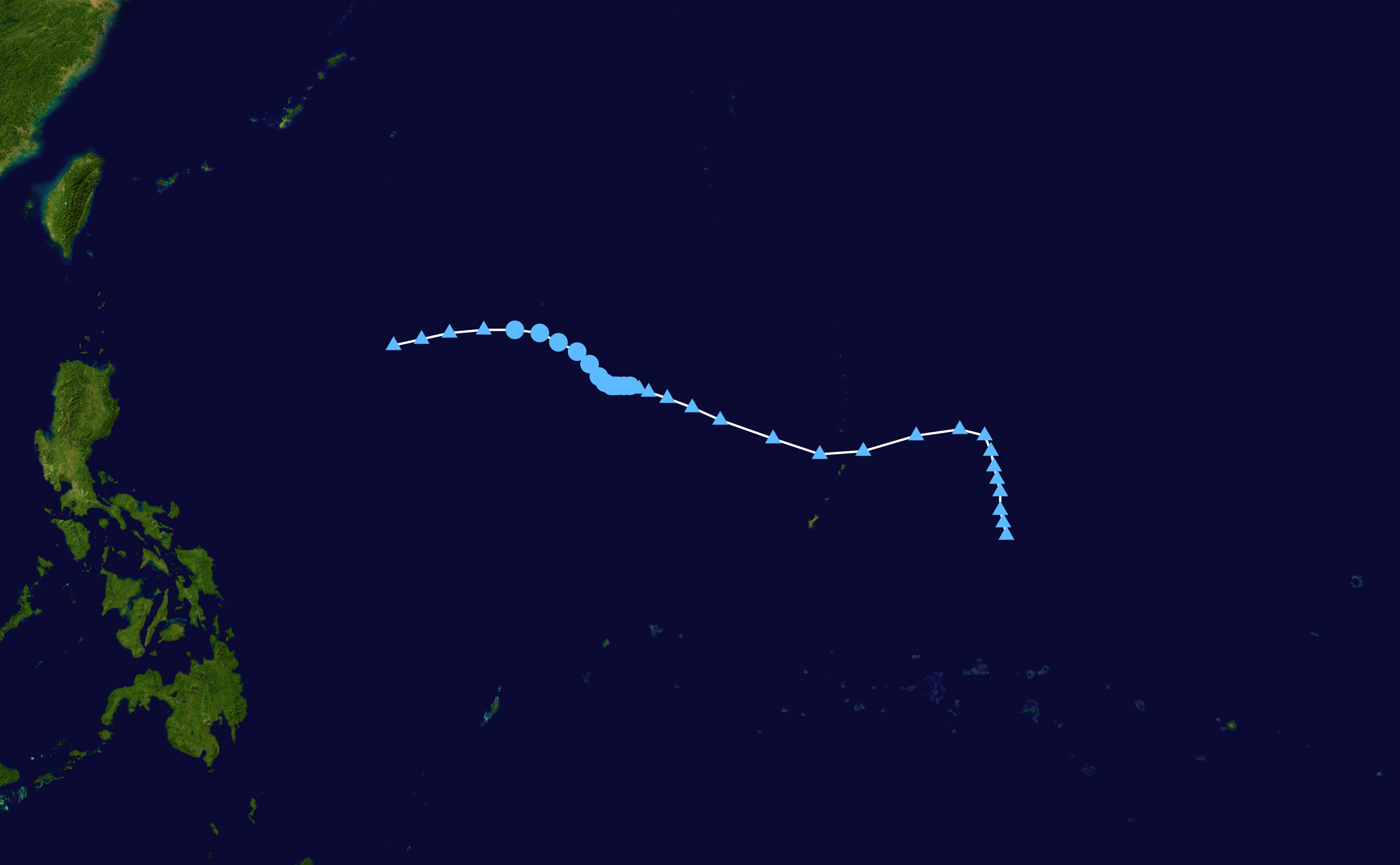
- Duration: October 2 – October 8
- Peak intensity: 55 km/h (35 mph) (1-min); 1008 hPa (mbar)

Tropical Depression 26W developed out of an area of disturbed weather located near the Mariana Islands on September 29. While passing near Guam, the disturbance was designated a tropical depression. Shortly after, the depression became disorganized as wind shear displaced the convection associated with the storm. Over the next 24 hours, the depression stalled in response to weak steering currents before a subtropical ridge developed to the north and caused the system to move quickly to the west. The low became separated from almost all of its convection on October 6 before being absorbed into a frontal system the next day.

=== Typhoon Ivan (Narsing) ===
- Violent typhoon (JMA)
- Category 5 super typhoon (SSHWS)
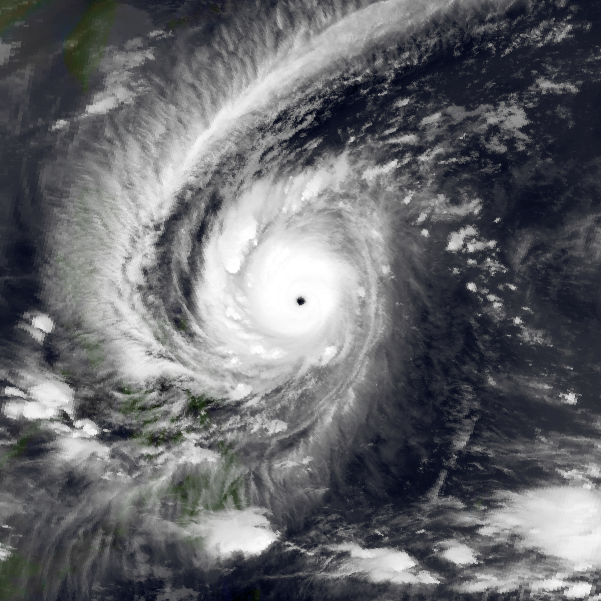
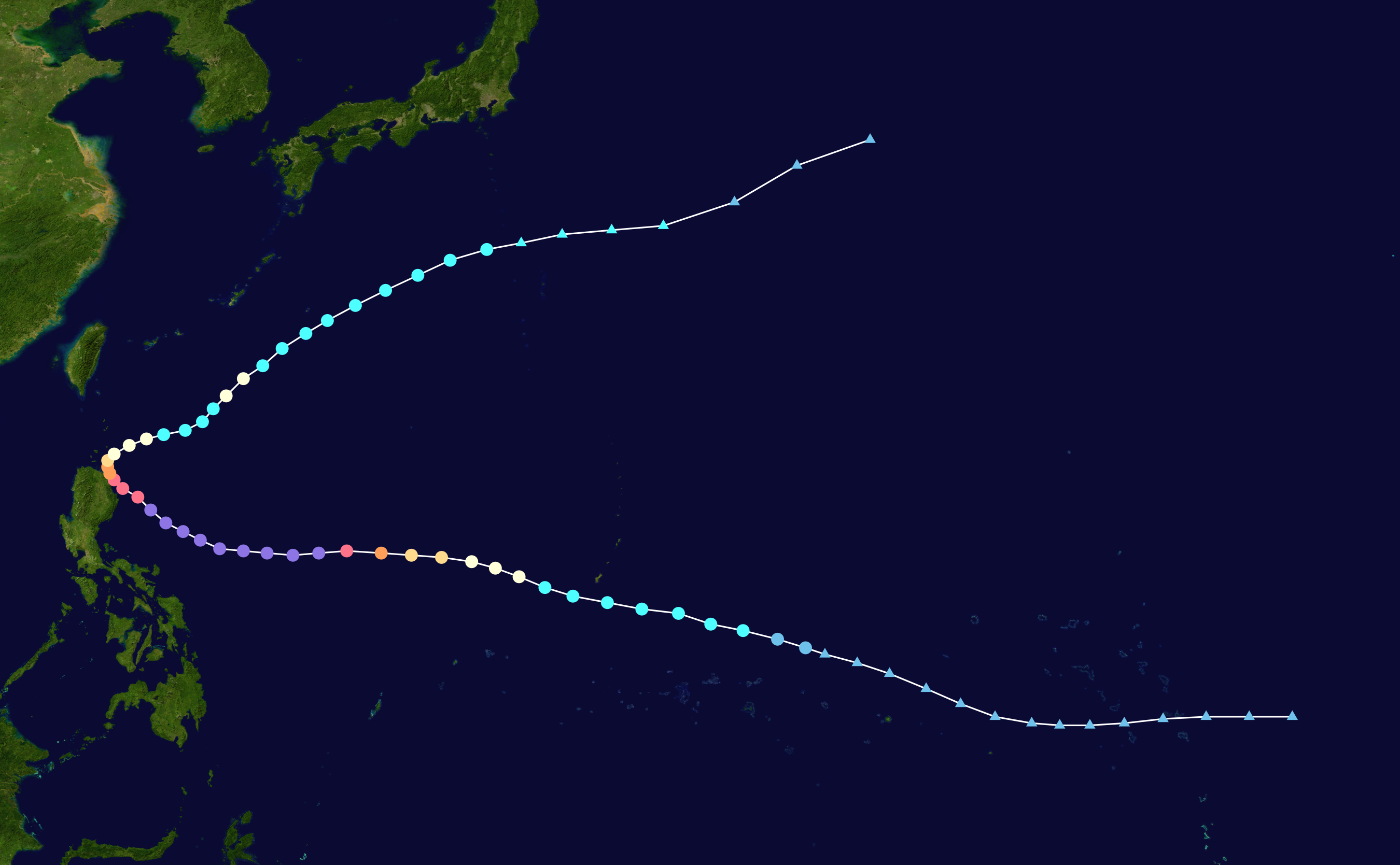
- Duration: October 13 – October 25
- Peak intensity: 195 km/h (120 mph) (10-min); 905 hPa (mbar)

Forming out of an area of disturbed weather on October 13, Ivan gradually intensified into a typhoon as it tracked steadily to the west-northwest. On October 15, the storm underwent rapid intensification and reached an intensity corresponding to Category 5 status on the Saffir–Simpson hurricane scale. Late on October 17, Ivan reached its peak strength with winds of 295 km/h (183 mph) and a barometric pressure of 905 hPa (mbar). Shortly thereafter, the typhoon began to weaken as it approached the Philippines. Ivan eventually made landfall in northern Luzon with winds of 220 km/h (140 mph) on October 20 before weakening to a tropical storm the next day. The storm then curved northeastward and became extratropical on October 25, dissipating the following day. During its existence, Ivan was monitored by PAGASA and designated with the local name Narsing.

Although Ivan was a powerful storm at landfall, its effects were relatively minor compared to the storm's intensity; however, 14 people were killed during the storm and two others were listed as missing. Agricultural industries sustained the most severe damage, as thousands of animals drowned in the storm. Throughout the Philippines, damage amounted to $9.6 million (1997 USD; $13.1 million 2009 USD). A total of 1,779 homes were destroyed, 13,771 others were damaged and 4,600 hectares of farmland were flooded by the storm.

=== Typhoon Joan ===
- Violent typhoon (JMA)
- Category 5 super typhoon (SSHWS)
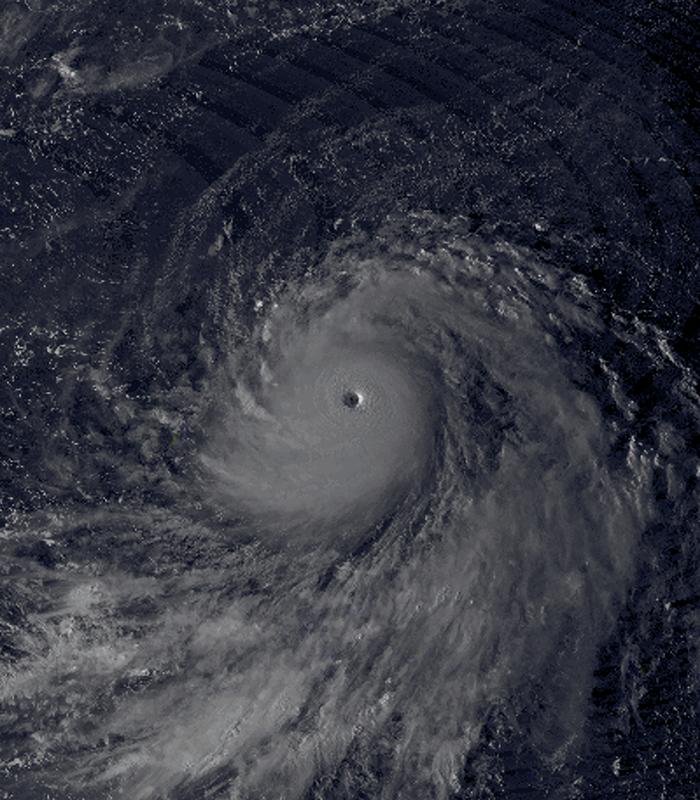
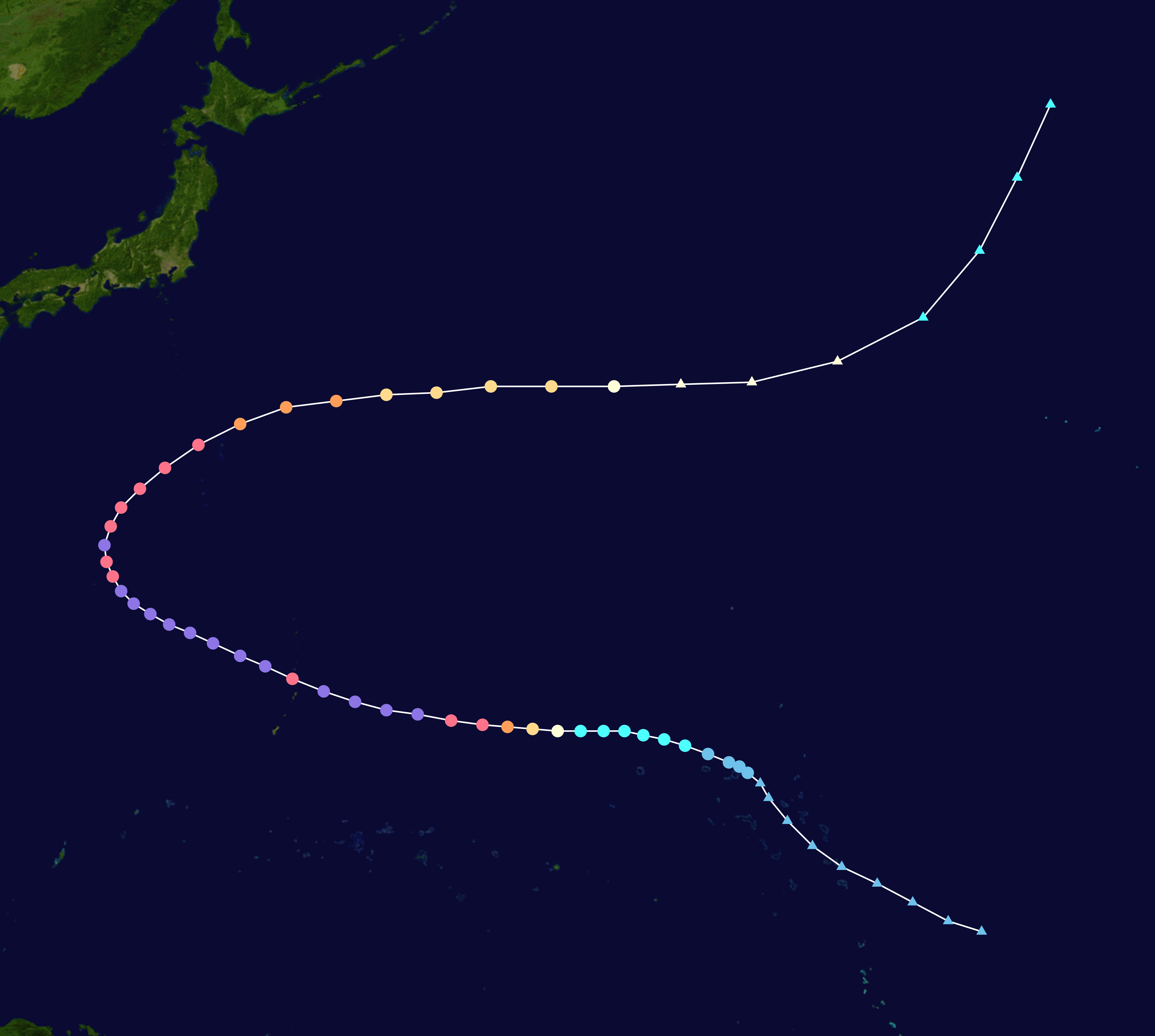
- Duration: October 13 – October 24
- Peak intensity: 195 km/h (120 mph) (10-min); 905 hPa (mbar)

Typhoon Joan caused significant damage throughout the Marshall Islands. The most severe damage occurred on Anatahan where 37 homes were destroyed. Three people were injured during preparations for the storm when a wind gust blew a sheet of plywood into residents. Damages from the storm amounted to $200,000, mainly on Anatahan.

=== Typhoon Keith ===
- Violent typhoon (JMA)
- Category 5 super typhoon (SSHWS)
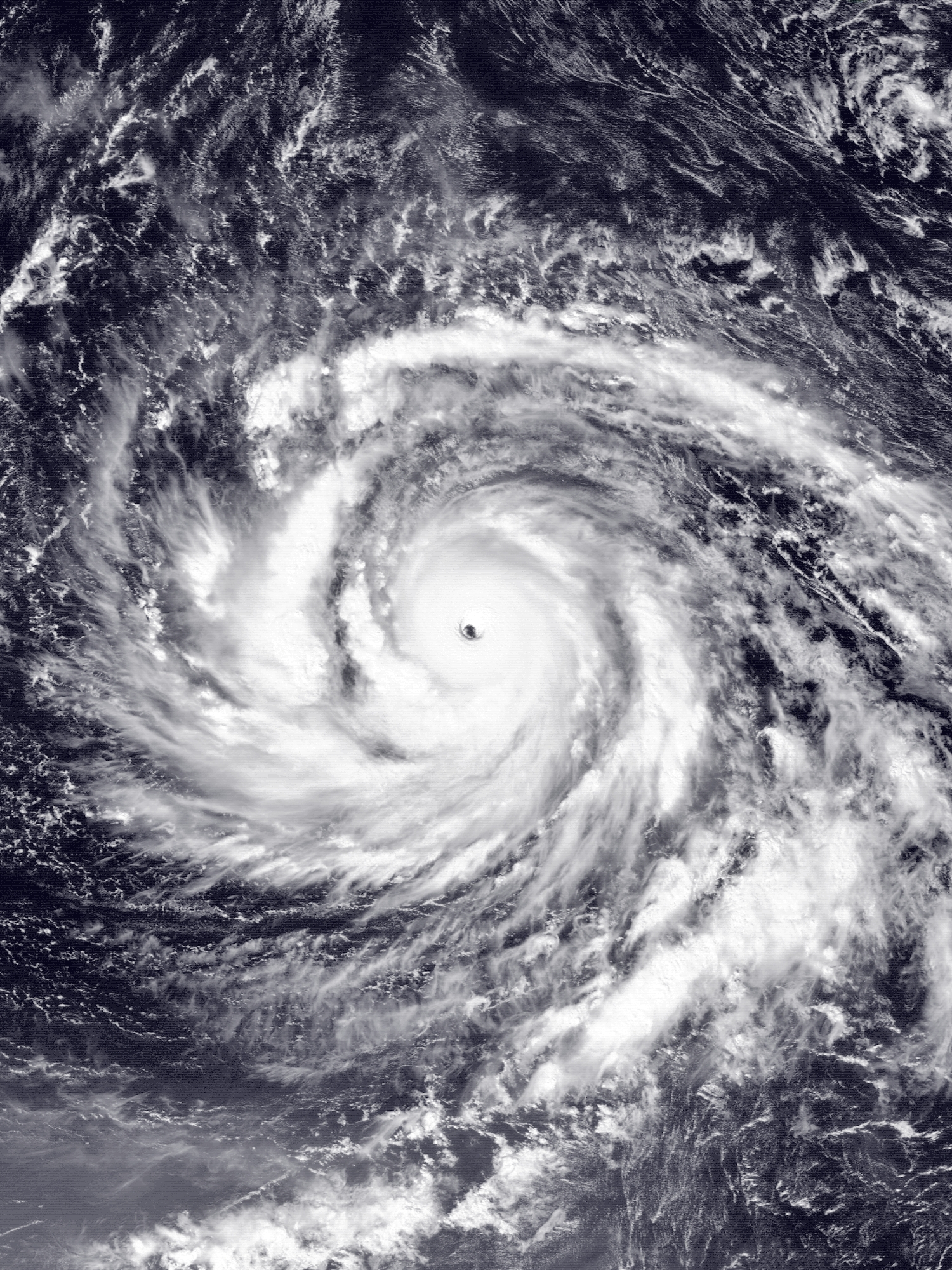
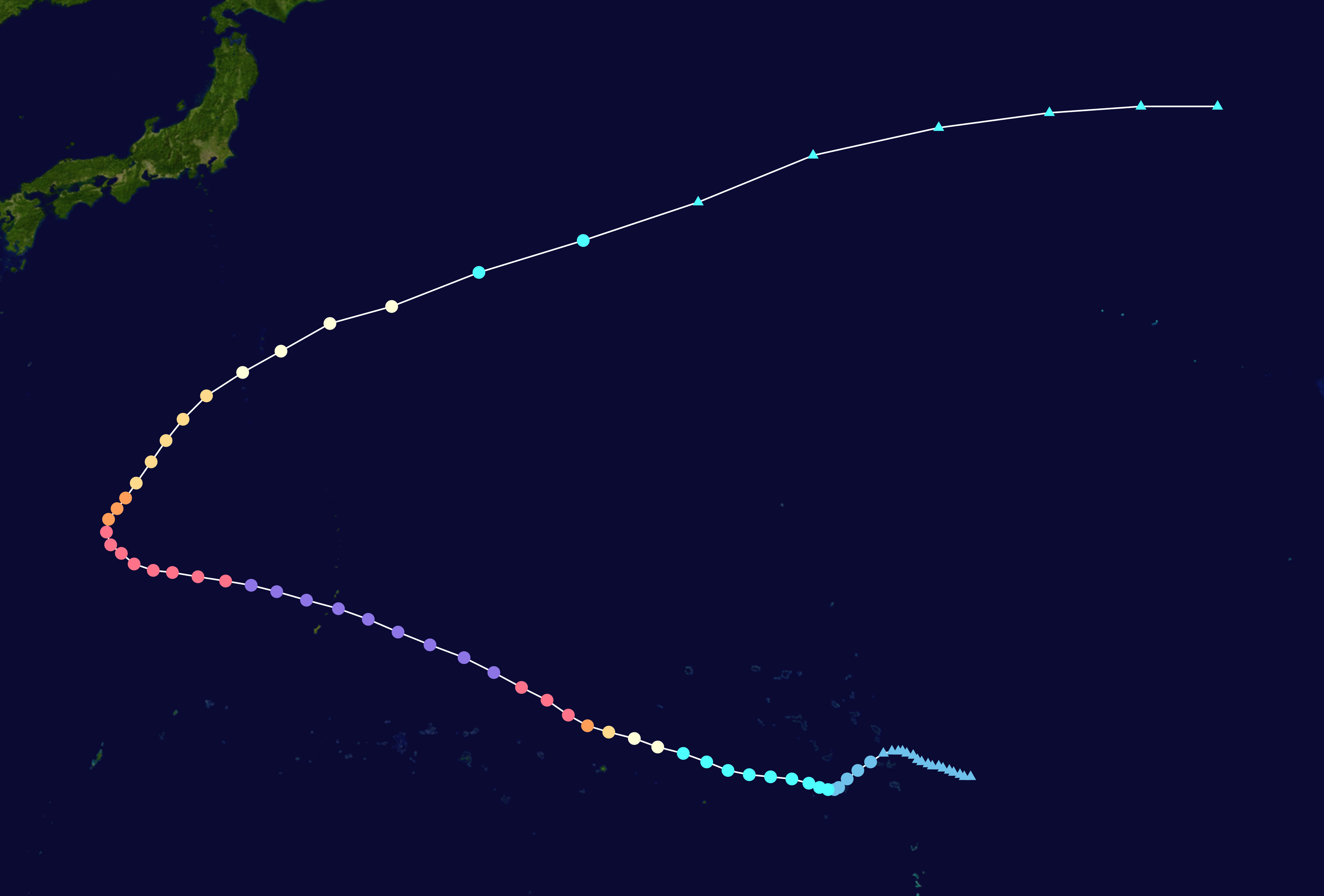
- Duration: October 26 – November 8
- Peak intensity: 205 km/h (125 mph) (10-min); 910 hPa (mbar)

The tenth of eleven tropical cyclones to attain super typhoon intensity in the western North Pacific during 1997, Keith formed at low latitudes in the Marshall Islands. It was one of ten TCs which formed east of 160°E and south of 20°N — within the "El Niño". Keith was a recurving TC which passed between the Islands of Rota and Tinian (only 50 nmi or 93 km apart) on the west-bound leg of its recurving track. NEXRAD imagery from Guam indicated the eye wall cloud of Keith never touched land as it threaded the narrow channel between these two islands. As such, the Mariana Islands were spared the full force of Keith. Keith's compact wind and cloud structure were revealed by Guam's NEXRAD Equatorial westerly winds bounded by twin near-equatorial troughs preceded the formation of Keith and a Southern Hemisphere twin.

=== Severe Tropical Storm Linda (Openg) ===
- Severe tropical storm (JMA)
- Category 1 typhoon (SSHWS)
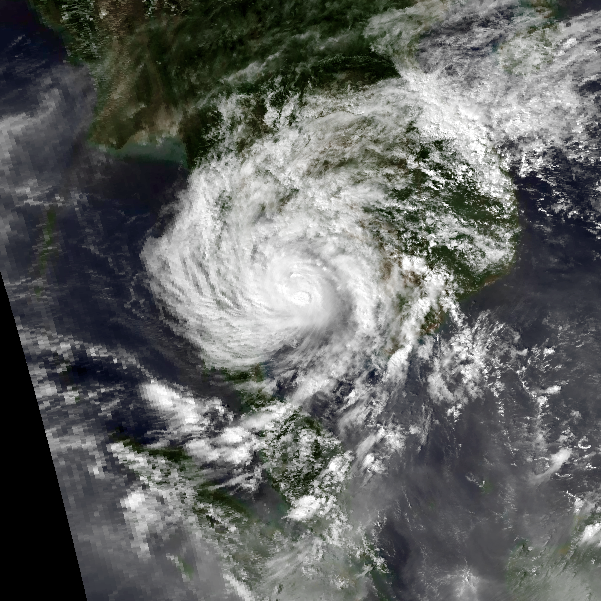
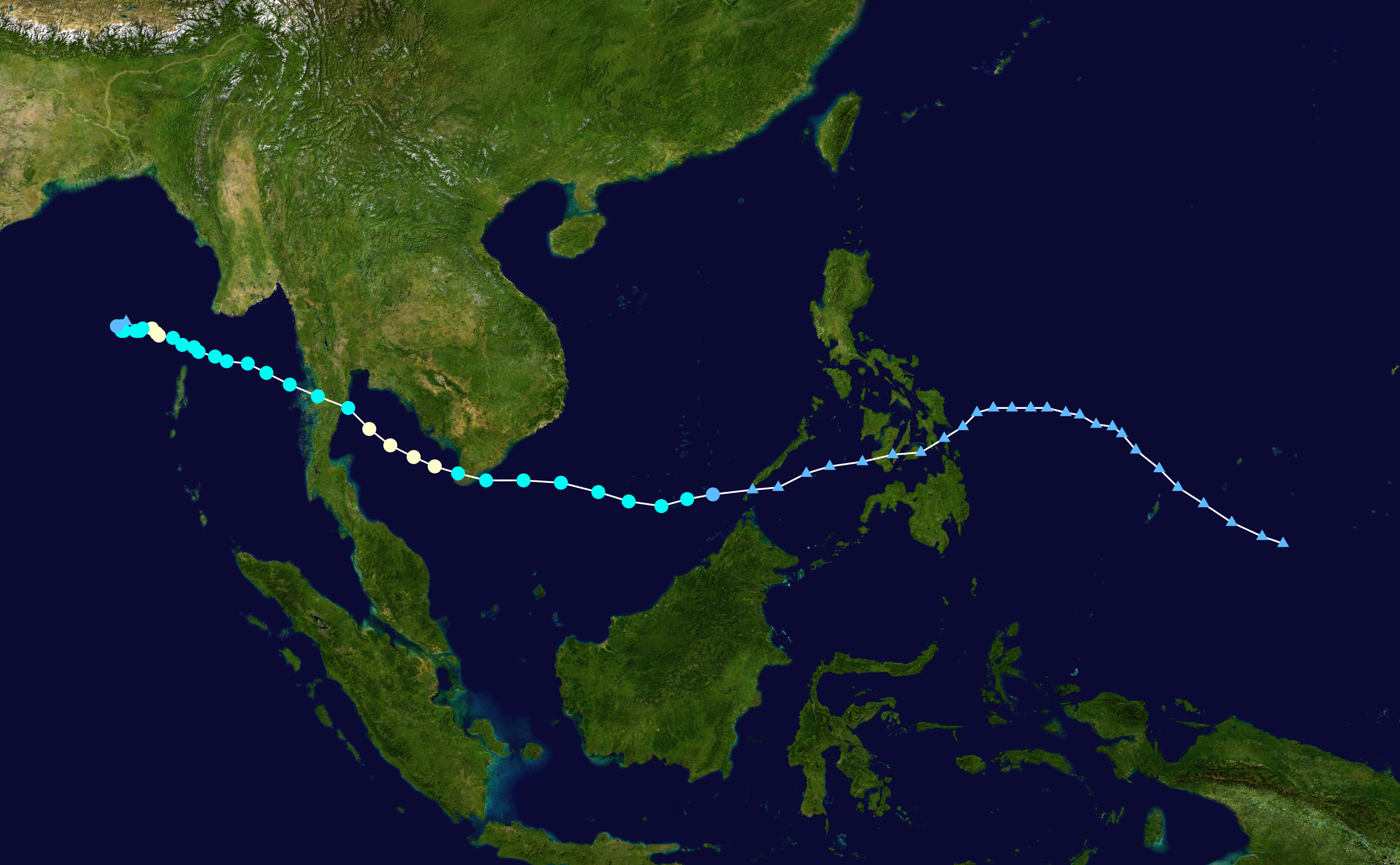
- Duration: October 31 – November 3 (Exited basin)
- Peak intensity: 95 km/h (60 mph) (10-min); 985 hPa (mbar)

Typhoon Linda, after moving through the Philippines and the South China Sea, hit the Malay Peninsula on November 3. It restrengthened in the Bay of Bengal, but vertical shear caused Linda to dissipate on the 9th.

On 2 November, Linda hit the southern tip of Vietnam, the Cà Mau province, causing unprecedented havoc with 3,070 people being killed in Vietnam, most of which drowned at sea. Nearly 80,000 houses are reported as destroyed and almost 140,000 as badly damaged. Infrastructure (roads, schools and hospitals) also suffered heavily and huge swathes of rice paddy were swamped. The hardest hit provinces were Kiên Giang, Cà Mau, Bạc Liêu, Sóc Trăng, Trà Vinh, Bến Tre and Vũng Tàu. It was the worst typhoon to strike the area in 100 years. Damages from the storm amounted to VND 7 trillion (US$409 million).

Elsewhere in Thailand and the Philippines, Linda caused further deaths from flooding and heavy damage.

=== Tropical Storm Mort (Pining) ===
- Tropical storm (JMA)
- Category 1 typhoon (SSHWS)
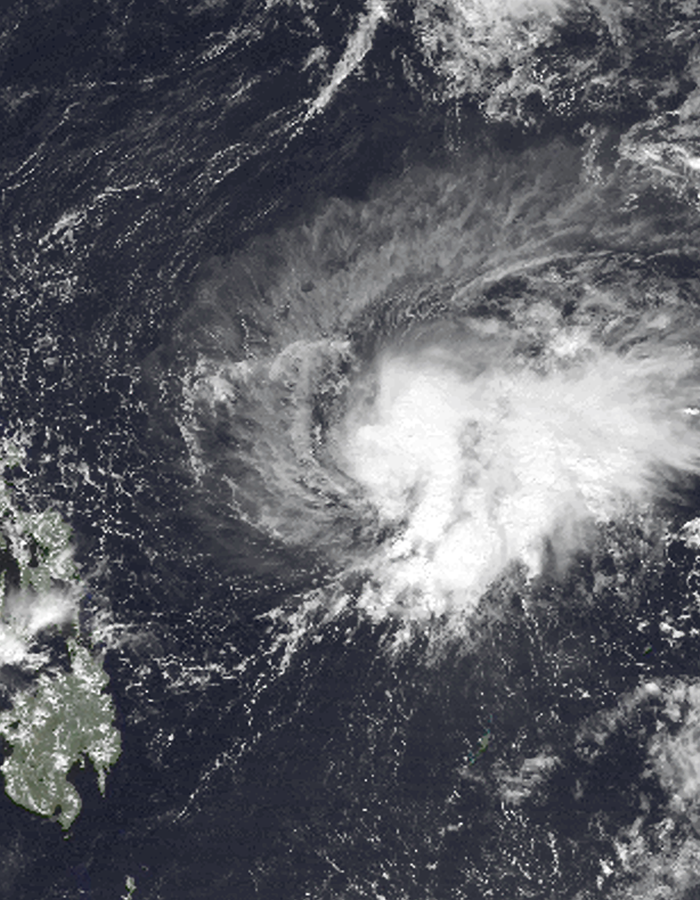
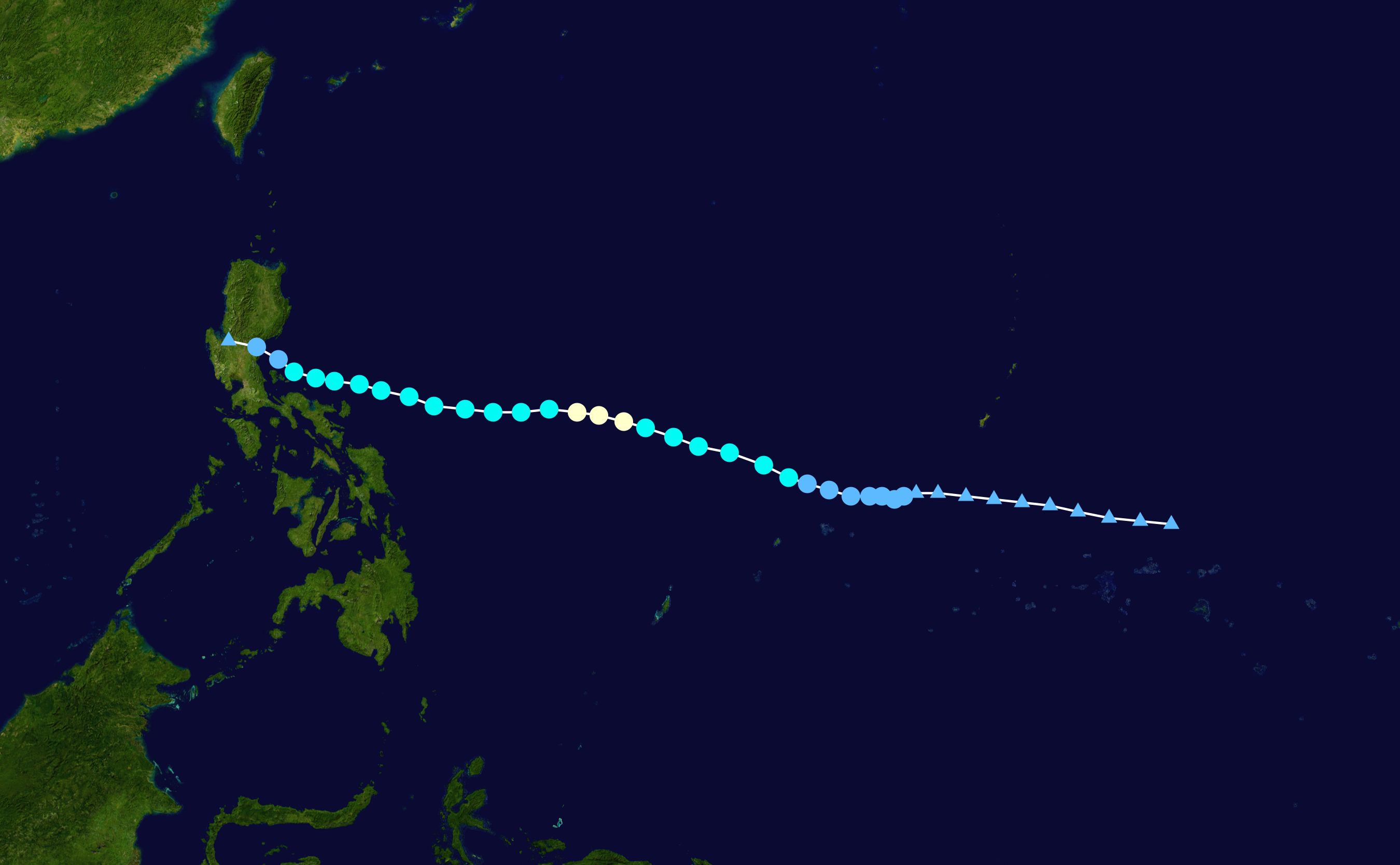
- Duration: November 9 – November 16
- Peak intensity: 85 km/h (50 mph) (10-min); 992 hPa (mbar)

From November 12–16, Philippine Atmospheric, Geophysical and Astronomical Services Administration tracked the storm, and named it Pining.

The remnants of Tropical Storm Mort brought locally heavy rainfall to areas of northern Luzon, resulting in minor flooding.

=== Typhoon Paka (Rubing) ===
- Very strong typhoon (JMA)
- Category 5 super typhoon (SSHWS)
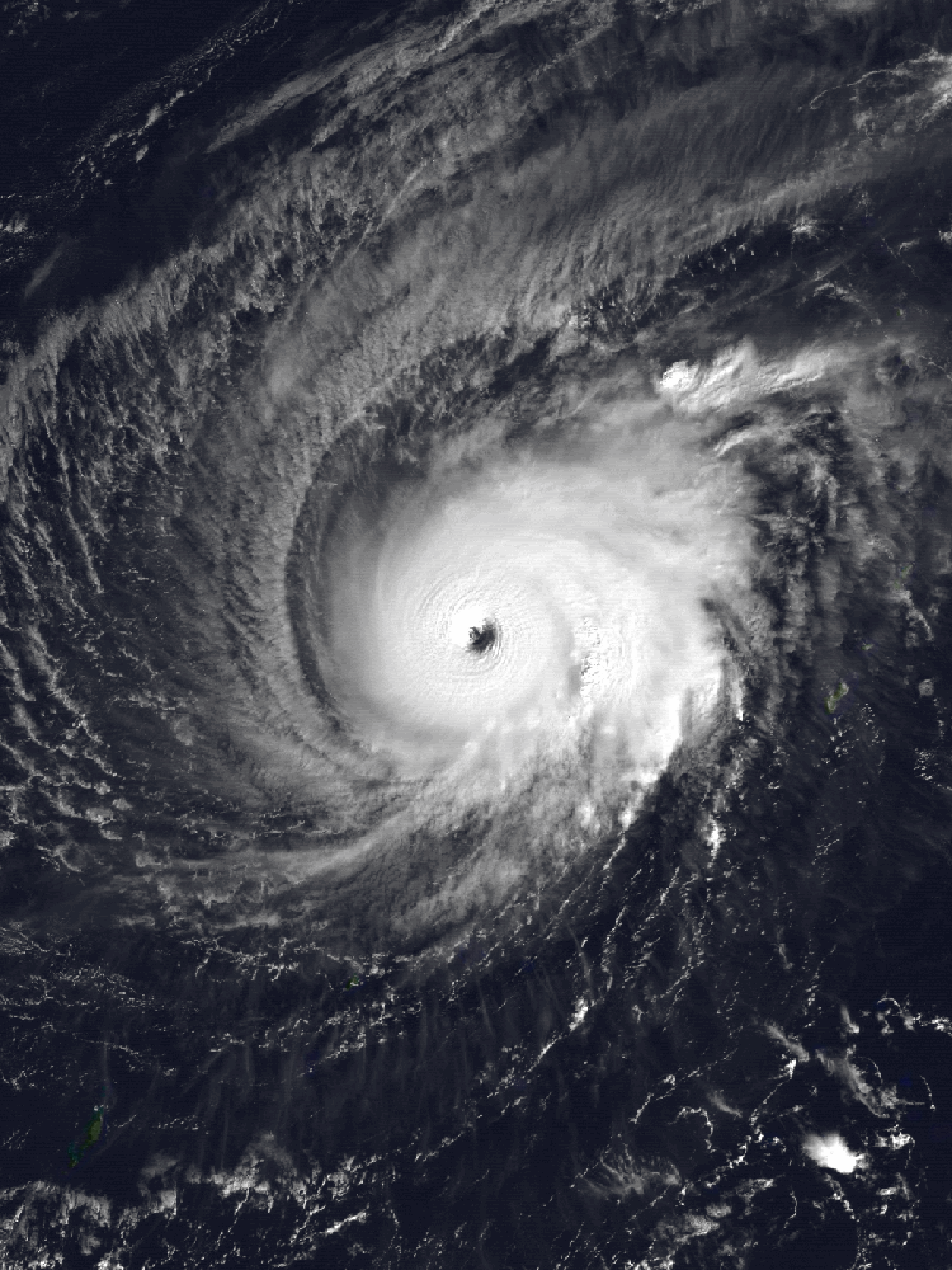
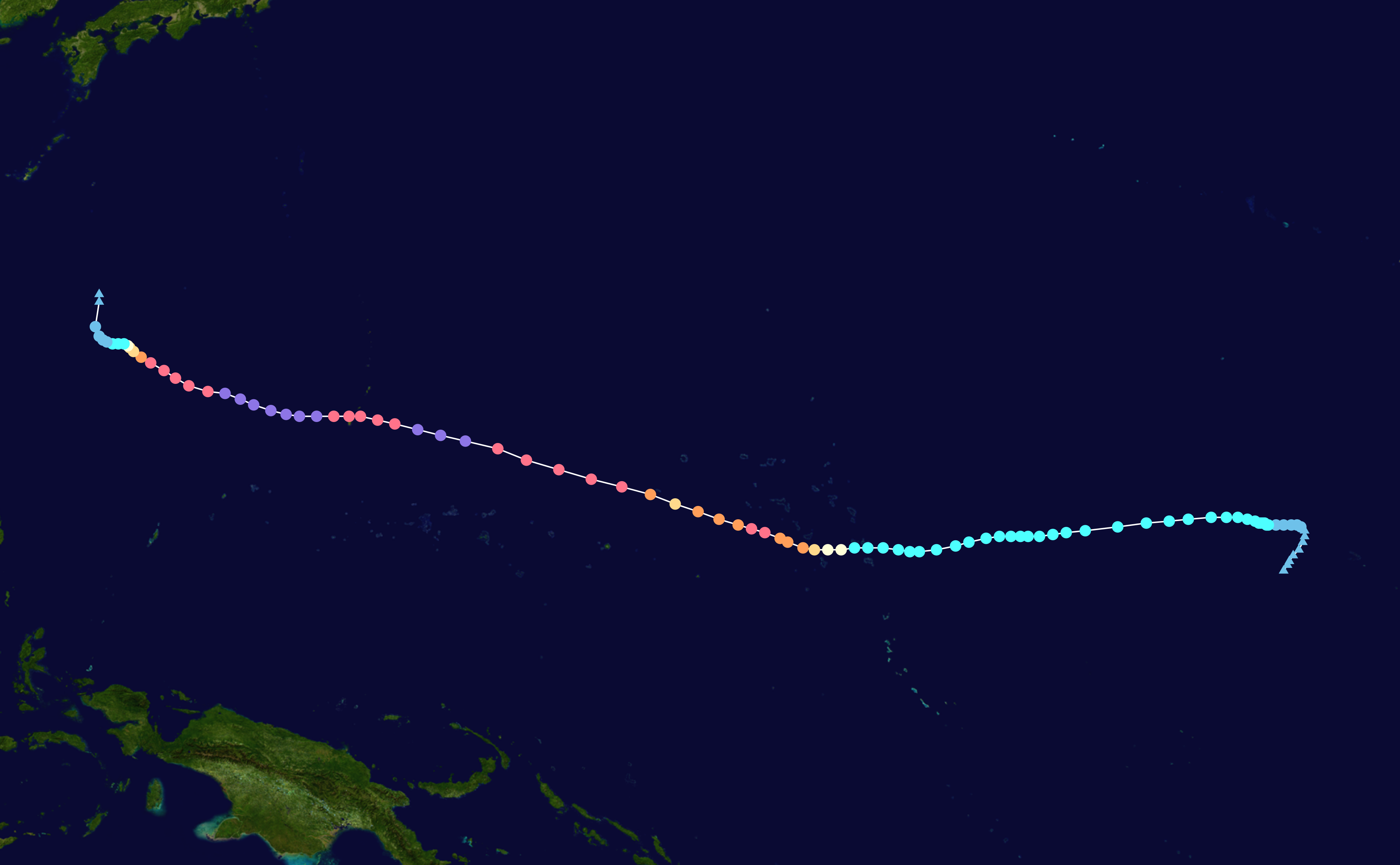
- Duration: December 7 (entered basin) – December 23
- Peak intensity: 185 km/h (115 mph) (10-min); 920 hPa (mbar)

The final super typhoon of the year developed in the Central Pacific on November 28. It moved westward, strengthening into a tropical storm before crossing the International Date Line on December 7. Conditions were marginally favorable for development, and Paka remained a tropical storm until December 10, when it was able to become a typhoon. Five days later, Paka reached Super Typhoon strength, the eleventh of the year. The next day it crossed over Guam, and on December 18, Paka reached a peak of 185 mph winds. After causing major damage across the smaller Western Pacific island groups, Paka rapidly weakened and dissipated on December 22.

Typhoon Paka first impacted the Marshall Islands, where it dropped heavy rainfall and left $80 million in damage (1997 USD, $109 million 2009 USD). Later, it passed just north of Guam, where strong winds destroyed about 1,500 buildings and damaged 10,000 more; 5,000 people were left homeless, and the island experienced a complete power outage following the typhoon. Damage on the island totaled $500 million (1997 USD, $680 million 2009 USD), which warranted the retirement of its name. Paka also caused light damage in the Northern Mariana Islands, and overall the typhoon caused no reported fatalities.

== Storm names ==
During the season 29 named tropical cyclones developed in the Western Pacific and were named by the Joint Typhoon Warning Center, when it was determined that they had become tropical storms. These names were contributed to a revised list which started in 1996.

Hannah	Isa	Jimmy	Kelly	Levi	Marie	Nestor	Opal	Peter	Rosie	Scott	Tina	Victor	Winnie	Yule
Zita	Amber	Bing	Cass	David	Ella	Fritz	Ginger	Hank	Ivan	Joan	Keith	Linda	Mort	

=== Philippines ===
Atring	Bining	Kuring	Daling	Elang
Goring	Huling	Ibiang	Luming	Miling
Narsing	Openg	Pining	Rubing	Saling (unused)
Tasing (unused)	Unsing (unused)	Walding (unused)	Yeyeng (unused)	
Auxiliary list
				Anding (unused)
Binang (unused)	Kadiang (unused)	Dinang (unused)	Epang (unused)	Gundang (unused)

The Philippine Atmospheric, Geophysical and Astronomical Services Administration (PAGASA) uses its own naming scheme for tropical cyclones in their area of responsibility. PAGASA assigns names to tropical depressions that form within their area of responsibility and any tropical cyclone that might move into their area of responsibility. Should the list of names for a given year prove to be insufficient, names are taken from an auxiliary list, the first 10 of which are published each year before the season starts. This is the same list used for the 1993 season. PAGASA uses its own naming scheme that starts in the Filipino alphabet, with names of Filipino female names ending with "ng" (A, B, K, D, etc.). This naming list was not used again as PAGASA started a new naming scheme in the 2001 season. Names that were not assigned/used are marked in gray.

== Season effects ==
This table summarizes all the systems that developed within or moved into the North Pacific Ocean, to the west of the International Date Line during 1997. The tables also provide an overview of a systems intensity, duration, land areas affected and any deaths or damages associated with the system.

Name	Dates	Peak intensity			Areas affected	Damage (USD)	Deaths	Ref(s).
Name	Dates	Category	Wind speed	Pressure	Areas affected	Damage (USD)	Deaths	Ref(s).
Hannah (Atring)	January 19–24	Tropical depression	65 km/h (40 mph)	1,002 hPa (29.59 inHg)	Caroline Islands	None	None	
Isa	April 12–23	Very strong typhoon	155 km/h (96 mph)	940 hPa (27.76 inHg)	Caroline Islands, Mariana Islands	$1 million	None	
Jimmy	April 22–26	Tropical storm	65 km/h (40 mph)	994 hPa (29.35 inHg)	Marshall Islands, Caroline Islands	None	None	
Kelly	May 6–10	Tropical storm	65 km/h (40 mph)	998 hPa (29.47 inHg)	Marshall Islands	None	None	
Levi (Bining)	May 26–30	Tropical storm	75 km/h (47 mph)	992 hPa (29.29 inHg)	Philippines, Ryukyu Islands	Unknown	53	
Marie	May 27 – June 1	Strong typhoon	120 km/h (75 mph)	965 hPa (28.50 inHg)	Marshall Islands	None	None	
Nestor	June 5–14	Very strong typhoon	185 km/h (115 mph)	930 hPa (27.46 inHg)	Caroline Islands, Mariana Islands	None	None	
Opal (Kuring)	June 14–20	Strong typhoon	140 km/h (87 mph)	960 hPa (28.35 inHg)	Japan	$3.24 million	3	
Peter (Daling)	June 22–28	Strong typhoon	120 km/h (75 mph)	970 hPa (28.64 inHg)	Japan	$1.91 million	3	
TD	June 22	Tropical depression	Not specified	1,006 hPa (29.71 inHg)	Marshall Islands	None	None	
TD	June 22–30	Tropical depression	Not specified	1,006 hPa (29.71 inHg)	Caroline Islands	None	None	
TD	June 23–24	Tropical depression	Not specified	1,004 hPa (29.65 inHg)	Mariana Islands	None	None	
TD	June 29–30	Tropical depression	Not specified	1,008 hPa (29.77 inHg)	None	None	None	
TD	July 2–7	Tropical depression	Not specified	1,004 hPa (29.65 inHg)	Caroline Islands	None	None	
TD	July 11–12	Tropical depression	Not specified	1,008 hPa (29.77 inHg)	Philippines	None	None	
Rosie (Elang)	July 18–31	Very strong typhoon	185 km/h (115 mph)	920 hPa (27.17 inHg)	Caroline Islands, Japan	$91.7 million	5	
TD	July 18–20	Tropical depression	Not specified	1,014 hPa (29.94 inHg)	Wake Island	None	None	
Scott	July 20 – August 2	Tropical storm	75 km/h (47 mph)	992 hPa (29.29 inHg)	None	None	None	
TD	July 24–26	Tropical depression	Not specified	1,010 hPa (29.83 inHg)	Caroline Islands	None	None	
TD	July 25 – August 1	Tropical depression	Not specified	1,000 hPa (29.53 inHg)	None	None	None	
Tina (Huling)	July 29 – August 9	Strong typhoon	140 km/h (87 mph)	955 hPa (28.20 inHg)	Ryukyu Islands, South Korea	None	None	
Victor (Goring)	July 30 – August 4	Severe tropical storm	110 km/h (68 mph)	980 hPa (28.94 inHg)	China	$241 million	65	
Winnie (Ibiang)	August 6–20	Very strong typhoon	185 km/h (115 mph)	915 hPa (27.02 inHg)	Mariana Islands, Ryukyu Islands, Taiwan, East China	$3.2 billion	372	
Yule	August 16–22	Severe tropical storm	100 km/h (62 mph)	980 hPa (28.94 inHg)	Marshall Islands	None	None	
16W	August 17–18	Tropical depression	55 km/h (34 mph)	1,004 hPa (29.65 inHg)	None	None	None	
Zita (Luming)	August 20–24	Severe tropical storm	100 km/h (62 mph)	980 hPa (28.94 inHg)	South China	$438 million	352	
Amber (Miling)	August 21–31	Strong typhoon	150 km/h (93 mph)	950 hPa (28.05 inHg)	Philippines, Taiwan, China	$52 million	Unknown	
TD	August 22–24	Tropical depression	Not specified	1,002 hPa (29.59 inHg)	None	None	None	
Bing	August 26 – September 4	Very strong typhoon	155 km/h (96 mph)	940 hPa (27.76 inHg)	Mariana Islands	None	5	
TD	August 27	Tropical depression	Not specified	1,010 hPa (29.83 inHg)	None	None	None	
Cass	August 27–30	Tropical storm	85 km/h (53 mph)	992 hPa (29.29 inHg)	China	None	None	
TD	September 3	Tropical depression	Not specified	1,010 hPa (29.83 inHg)	Marshall Islands	None	None	
Oliwa	September 3–16	Very strong typhoon	185 km/h (115 mph)	915 hPa (27.02 inHg)	Mariana Islands, Japan, South Korea	$50.1 million	12	
David	September 11 –19	Very strong typhoon	155 km/h (96 mph)	945 hPa (27.91 inHg)	Marshall Islands, Japan	None	None	
Ella	September 20–24	Tropical depression	65 km/h (40 mph)	1,002 hPa (29.59 inHg)	Caroline Islands	None	None	
Fritz	September 21–27	Severe tropical storm	100 km/h (62 mph)	980 hPa (28.94 inHg)	Vietnam, Cambodia, Laos	$5.1 million	28	
Ginger	September 23–30	Very strong typhoon	175 km/h (109 mph)	925 hPa (27.32 inHg)	Marshall Islands	None	None	
Hank	September 28 – October 4	Tropical depression	65 km/h (40 mph)	1,004 hPa (29.65 inHg)	Vietnam	None	None	
26W	October 2–8	Tropical depression	55 km/h (34 mph)	1,008 hPa (29.77 inHg)	Mariana Islands	None	None	
Ivan (Narsing)	October 13–25	Violent typhoon	195 km/h (121 mph)	905 hPa (26.72 inHg)	Marshall Islands, Caroline Islands, Mariana Islands, Philippines	$9.6 million	14	
Joan	October 13–24	Violent typhoon	195 km/h (121 mph)	905 hPa (26.72 inHg)	Marshall Islands, Caroline Islands, Mariana Islands	$300,000	1	
Keith	October 26 – November 8	Violent typhoon	205 km/h (127 mph)	910 hPa (26.87 inHg)	Marshall Islands, Caroline Islands, Mariana Islands	$15 million	1	
TD	October 27–29	Tropical depression	Not specified	1,008 hPa (29.77 inHg)	Philippines	None	None	
Linda (Openg)	October 31 – November 3	Severe tropical storm	95 km/h (59 mph)	985 hPa (29.09 inHg)	Vietnam, Thailand	$385 million	3,245	
Mort (Pining)	November 9–16	Tropical storm	85 km/h (53 mph)	992 hPa (29.29 inHg)	Caroline Islands, Philippines	None	None	
TD	November 11	Tropical depression	Not specified	1,016 hPa (30.00 inHg)	None	None	None	
Paka (Rubing)	December 7–23	Very strong typhoon	185 km/h (115 mph)	920 hPa (27.17 inHg)	Marshall Islands, Caroline Islands, Mariana Islands	$580 million	None	
Season aggregates
47 systems	January 19 – December 23, 1997		205 km/h (127 mph)	905 hPa (26.72 inHg)		$5.07 billion	4,159	

== See also ==
- Tropical cyclones in 1997
- Pacific typhoon season
- 1997 Atlantic hurricane season
- 1997 Pacific hurricane season
- 1997 North Indian Ocean cyclone season
- South-West Indian Ocean cyclone seasons: 1996–97, 1997–98
- Australian region cyclone seasons: 1996–97, 1997–98
- South Pacific cyclone seasons: 1996–97, 1997–98
