= 1965 Pacific typhoon season =

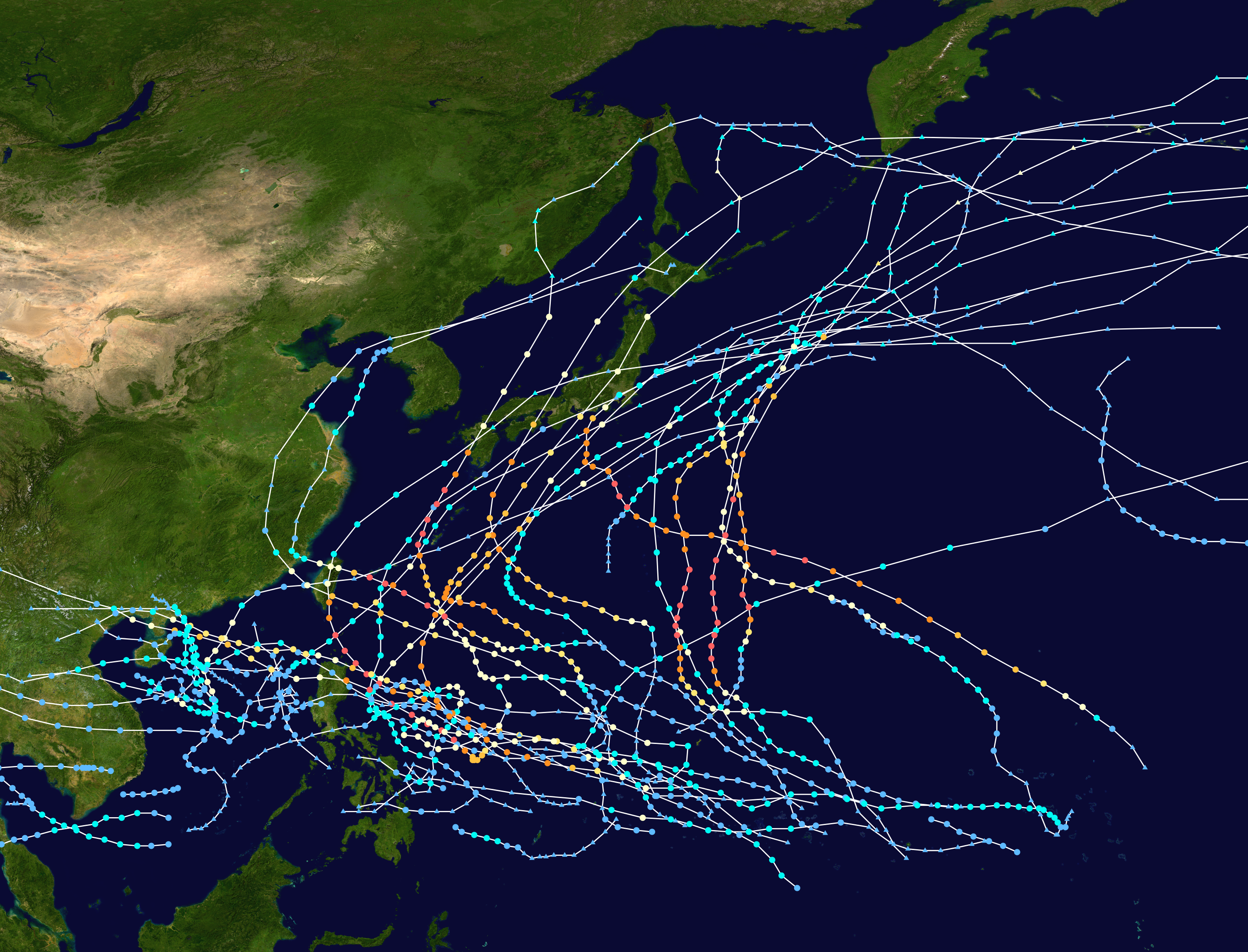
- Season summary map

Seasonal boundaries
- First system formed: January 2, 1965
- Last system dissipated: December 28, 1965

Strongest storm
- Name: Dinah
  - Maximum winds: 295 km/h (185 mph) (1-minute sustained)
  - Lowest pressure: 895 hPa (mbar)

Seasonal statistics
- Total depressions: 44
- Total storms: 35
- Typhoons: 21
- Very strong typhoons: 11 (unofficial) (record high; tied with 1997)
- Total fatalities: Unknown
- Total damage: Unknown

Related articles
- 1965 Atlantic hurricane season; 1965 Pacific hurricane season; 1965 North Indian Ocean cyclone season

The 1965 Pacific typhoon season was an extremely active Pacific typhoon season that had no official bounds; it ran year-round in 1965, but most tropical cyclones tend to form in the northwestern Pacific Ocean between June and December. These dates conventionally delimit the period of each year when most tropical cyclones form in the northwestern Pacific Ocean.

The scope of this article is limited to the Pacific Ocean, north of the equator and west of the International Date Line. Storms that form east of the date line and north of the equator are called hurricanes; see 1965 Pacific hurricane season. Tropical Storms formed in the entire west pacific basin were assigned a name by the Joint Typhoon Warning Center. Tropical depressions in this basin have the "W" suffix added to their number. Tropical depressions that enter or form in the Philippine area of responsibility are assigned a name by the Philippine Weather Bureau. This can often result in the same storm having two names.

The season was among the most active Pacific typhoon seasons on record. Between January and December 1965, there was a total of 44 tropical depressions, 35 tropical storms and named systems, 21 typhoons and 11 super typhoons, of which 8 became Category 5 strength on the Saffir-Simpson scale. As a result, the season featured the most super typhoons ever observed in a single year, later tied by the 1997 season.

Named storms formed in every month of 1965, a feat that wouldn't occur again until 50 years later in 2015.

== Systems ==
The 1965 Pacific typhoon season was among the most active Pacific typhoon seasons on record. Between January and December 1965, there was a total of 44 tropical depressions, 35 tropical storms and named systems, 21 typhoons and 11 super typhoons, of which 8 became Category 5 strength on the Saffir-Simpson scale. (Note: These metrics are referencing the Saffir-Simpson scale, adding all observed storms by the four standard agencies.) As a result, the season featured the most super typhoons ever observed in a single year, later tied by the 1997 season. The China Meteorological Administration (CMA), Hong Kong Observatory (HKO), Japan Meteorological Agency (JMA), and Joint Typhoon Warning Center (JTWC) each maintain tropical cyclone databases that include their respective intensity and path analyses for 1965, resulting in disparate storm counts and intensities.

=== Tropical Depression Atring ===
- Tropical depression (PAGASA)
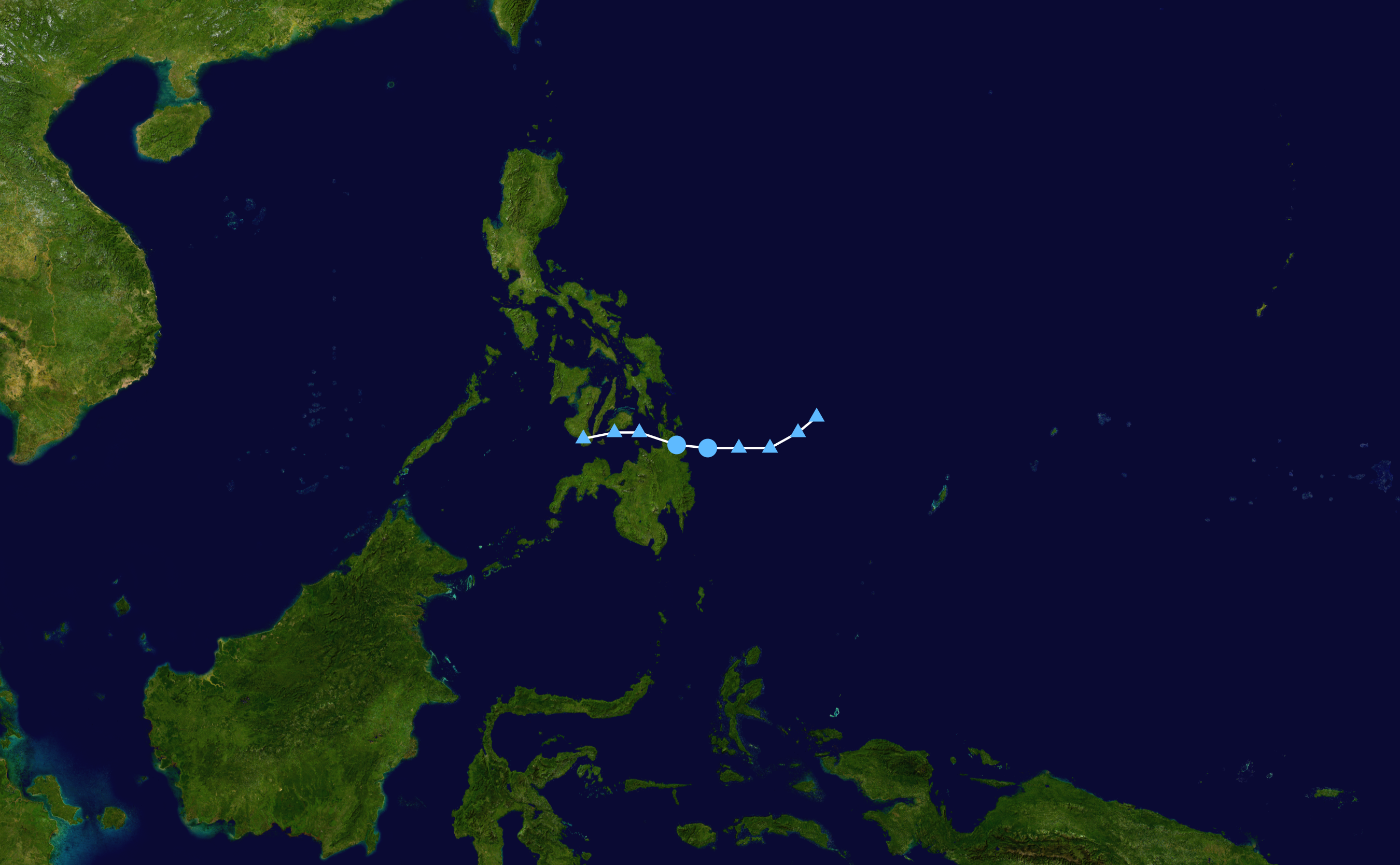
- Duration: January 16 – January 17
- Peak intensity: 55 km/h (35 mph) (10-min); 1003 hPa (mbar)

A low pressure system was spotted steadily approaching the Philippines on January 15. The next day, on January 16, the disturbance organized into a tropical depression receiving the name Atring via PAGASA. Shortly later, the depression peaked with winds of 55 km/h (34 mph) and pressure levels of 1003 hPa (mbar). The tropical depression collapsed back into an extratropical cyclone after a brief 12 hours and was last tracked by the agency on January 17.

=== Typhoon Patsy (Bining) ===
Peak intensity estimates
Agency	Wind (kt) (Note: The Joint Typhoon Warning Center (JTWC) estimates the maximum sustained wind of a tropical cyclone has the highest windspeed averaged over one minute, the China Meteorological Administration (CMA) averages such winds over two minutes, and the Hong Kong Observatory (HKO) and Japan Meteorological Agency (JMA) averages such winds over ten minutes in their historical records.)	Pressure (hPa)
CMA	68	989
HKO	60	990
JMA	—N/a	990
JTWC	65	—N/a

- Typhoon (JMA)
- Category 1 typhoon (SSHWS)
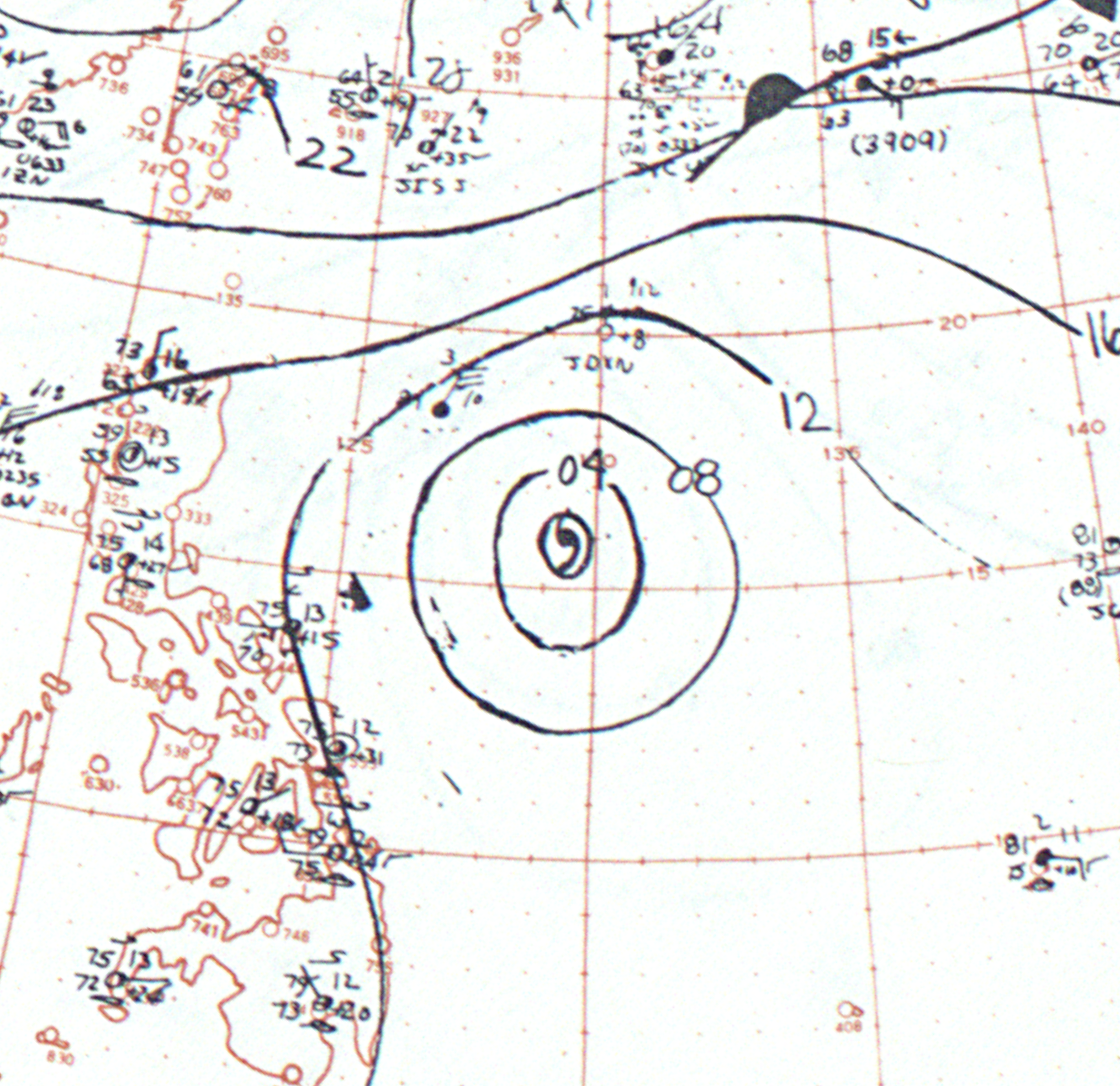
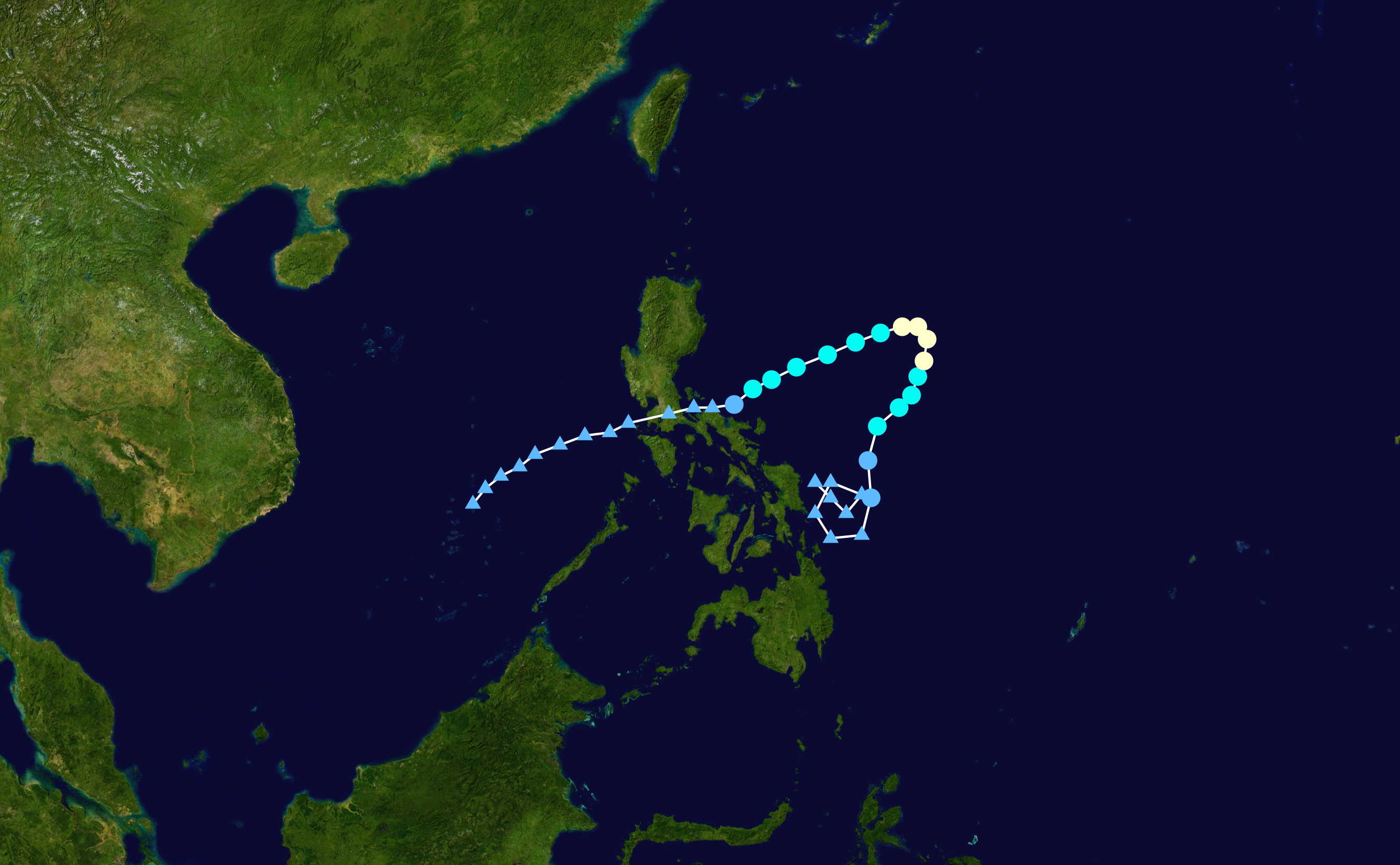
- Duration: January 19 – January 23
- Peak intensity: 120 km/h (75 mph) (1-min); 990 hPa (mbar)

On January 17, a short wave trough fractured off from powerful high lying westerly winds, being accompanied by a subsequent surge in the northeast wind flow. This led to a tropical disturbance being spotted by various agencies nearby Samar. The disturbance meandered in its position, before eventually tracking northward on January 19. Later that day, the disturbance eventually became a tropical storm assigned the name Patsy by the Joint Typhoon Warning Center. Continuing on its mostly northward trajectory, the tropical storm reached its peak intensity as a Category 1 typhoon on January 20, with winds of 120 km/h (75 mph) and pressure levels as low as 990 hPa (mbar). Upon reaching its peak intensity, Patsy took a sharp turn to the southwest weakening back into a tropical storm. The typhoon made landfall in Luzon as a tropical depression and collapsed into an extratropical cyclone upon crossing the island. The cyclone continued on a mostly southwest trajectory before it dissipated on January 26. The effects of the typhoon are unknown.

=== Tropical Storm Ruth ===
Peak intensity estimates
Agency	Wind (kt)	Pressure (hPa)
CMA	58	994
HKO	60	990
JMA	—N/a	994
JTWC	60	—N/a

- Severe tropical storm (JMA)
- Tropical storm (SSHWS)
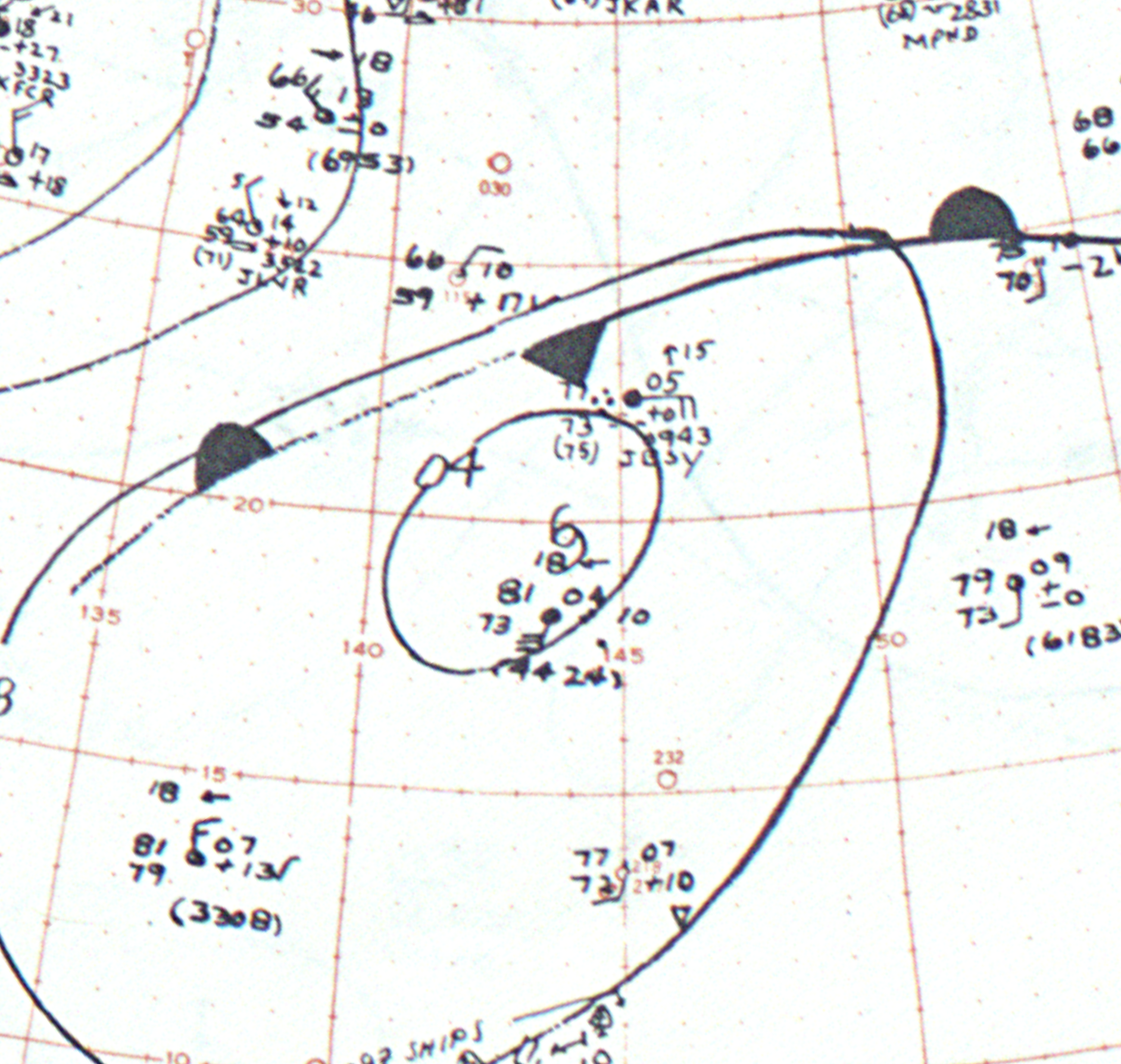
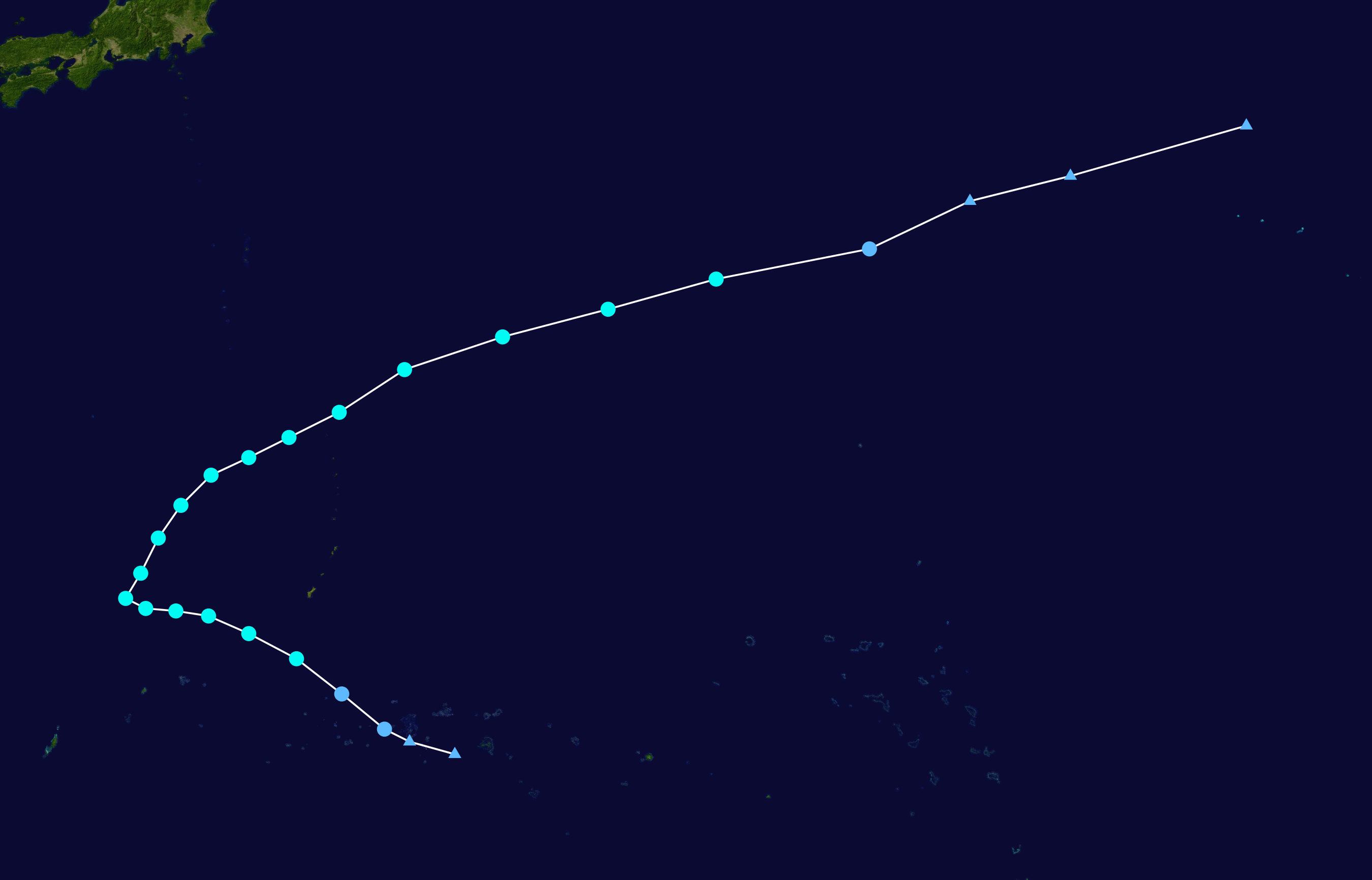
- Duration: January 21 – January 26
- Peak intensity: 110 km/h (70 mph) (1-min); 994 hPa (mbar)

A tropical disturbance was spotted by various agencies nearby Micronesia on January 20. Later that day, the Joint Typhoon Warning Center upgraded the disturbance to a tropical depression as it began moving northwest. On its northwest trajectory, the depression was upgraded to a tropical storm and was assigned the name Ruth, when situated south of Guam. After doing so, the storm started curving towards the west, reaching a primary peak intensity with winds of 85 km/h (53 mph). On January 23, Ruth took a sharp turn to the northeast and slightly weakened in the process. The storm started reintensifying later that same day on its northeast movement, reaching a secondary peak intensity with winds of 110 km/h (68 mph) and pressure levels of 994 hPa. The next day, the tropical storm started to change directory closer to the east as it started weakening. Ruth later started speeding up as it moved further into the central Pacific ocean, where it collapsed into an extratropical cyclone on January 26 and dissipated shortly thereafter.

=== CMA Tropical Depression 4 ===
- Tropical depression (CMA)
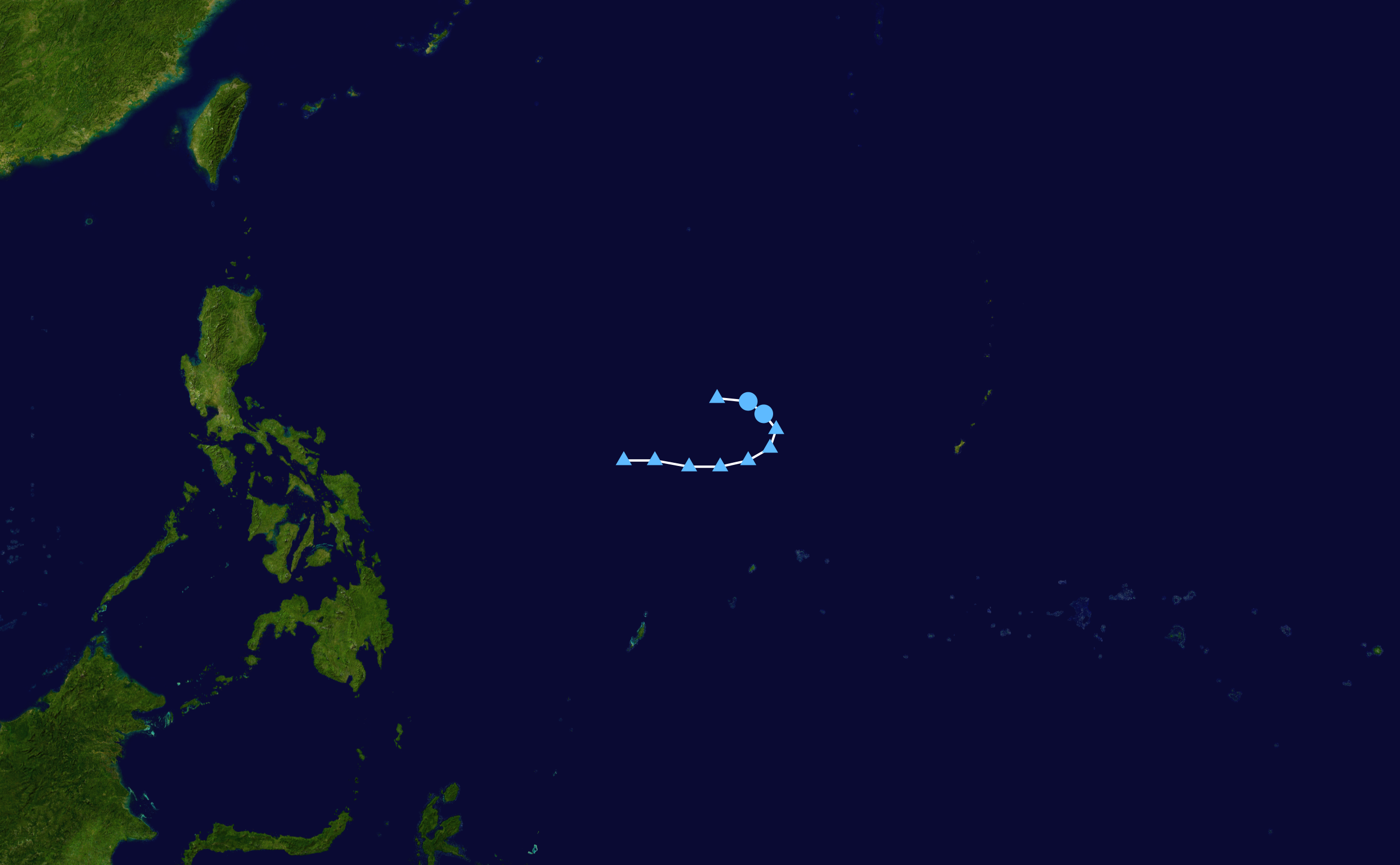
- Duration: January 24 – January 24
- Peak intensity: 45 km/h (30 mph) (10-min); 1002 hPa (mbar)

A tropical disturbance was spotted far east of the Philippines by the China Meteorological Administration on January 24. The disturbance, moving east, was quickly designated as a tropical depression by the agency, where they observed winds of 45 km/h (28 mph) and pressure levels of 1002 hPa (mbar). 12 hours after the depression reached its peak intensity, it collapsed back into an extratropical cyclone and steered to the right, eventually doing a 180° turn westward. It continued on its westward trajectory before it eventually fully dissipated on January 26.

=== Tropical Storm Sarah ===
Peak intensity estimates
Agency	Wind (kt)	Pressure (hPa)
CMA	38	1002
HKO	40	1002
JMA	—N/a	1002
JTWC	45	—N/a

- Tropical storm (JMA)
- Tropical storm (SSHWS)
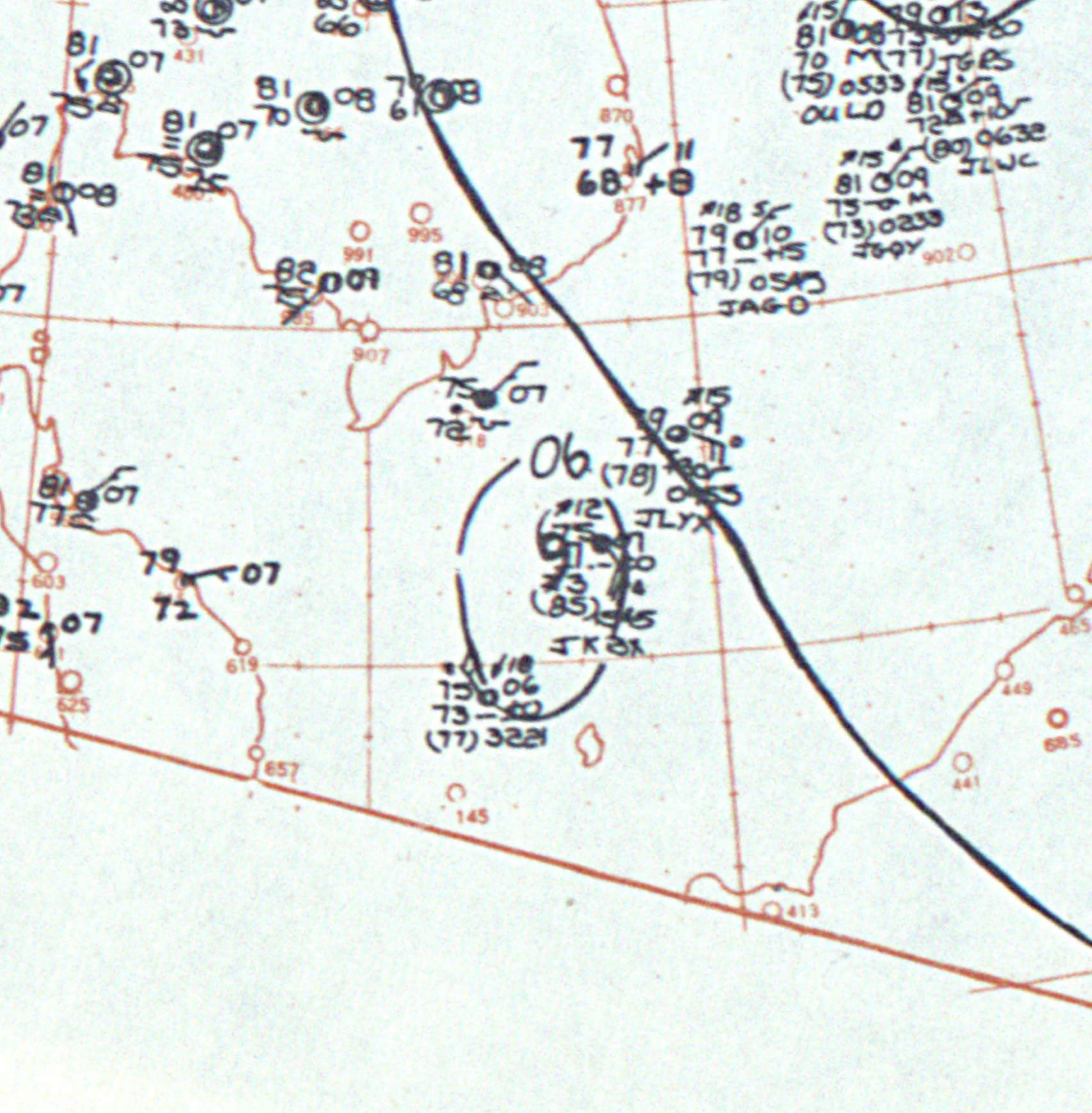
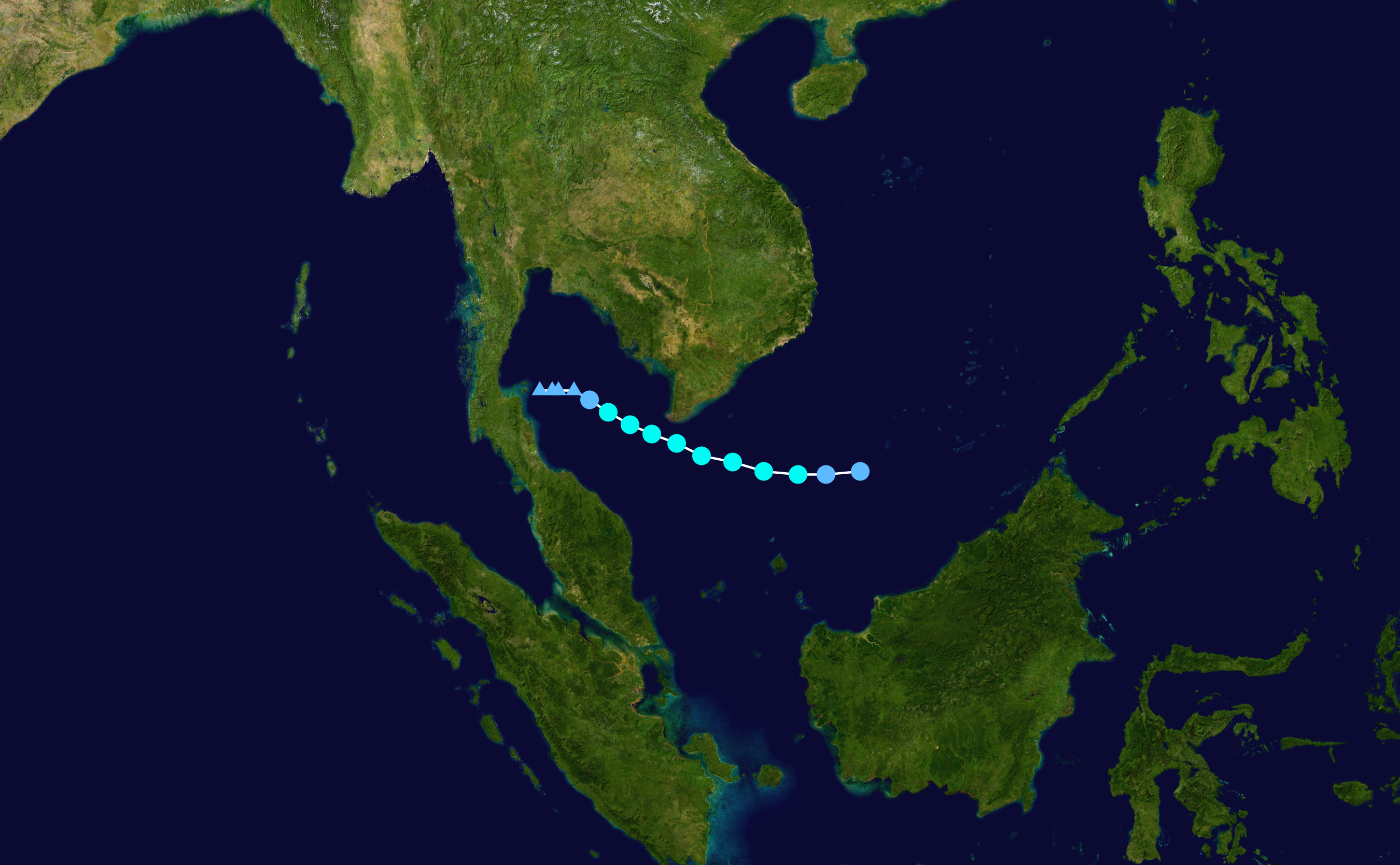
- Duration: February 15 – February 18
- Peak intensity: 85 km/h (50 mph) (1-min); 1002 hPa (mbar)

A tropical disturbance was located by various agencies in the South China Sea on February 14. On a steady and predictable westward trajectory, the disturbance was upgraded to a tropical depression later that day. On February 15, the depression was upgraded to a tropical storm and was promptly assigned the name Sarah by the Joint Typhoon Warning Center. Later that same day, the storm reached its peak intensity, with 1 minute sustained winds of 85 km/h (53 mph) and pressure levels of 1002 hPa. The tropical storm started turning gradually and slowly towards the northwest, coming in close proximity with southern Vietnam on February 16. Sarah held its tropical storm strength until February 17, where it collapsed into a tropical depression, sharply turned east, collapsed into an extratropical cyclone and dissipated shortly later. Despite the storm's close proximity to Vietnam, no damages or impacts were reported.

=== Tropical Storm Thelma (Kuring) ===
Peak intensity estimates
Agency	Wind (kt)	Pressure (hPa)
CMA	29	1000
HKO	30	1002
JTWC	40	—N/a

- Tropical depression (JMA)
- Tropical storm (SSHWS)
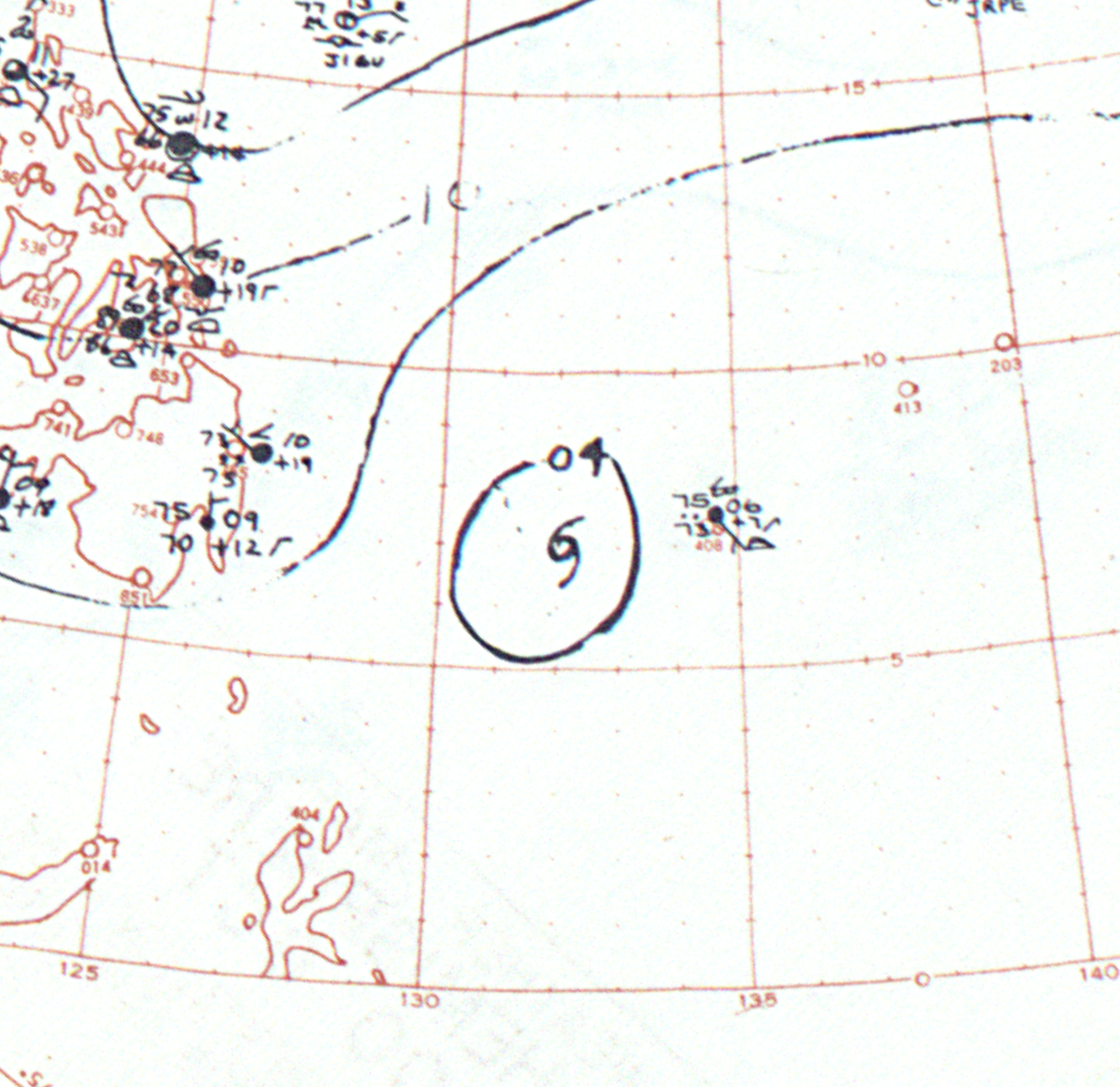
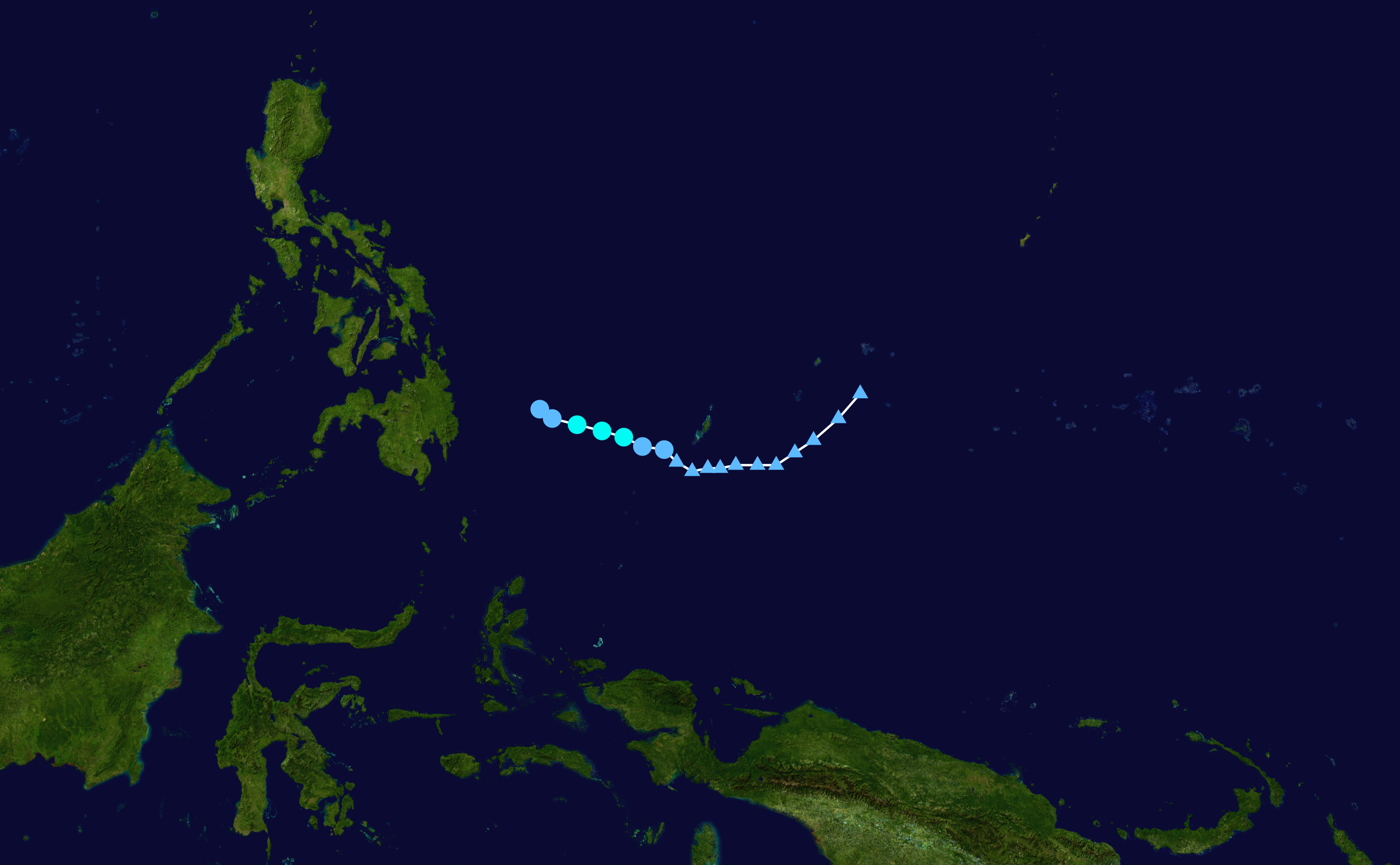
- Duration: February 18 – February 19
- Peak intensity: 75 km/h (45 mph) (1-min); 1000 hPa (mbar)

A low pressure system was spotted southeast, moving away from Guam on February 15. The system stayed weak for the few coming days, where it initially started on a southwest trajectory and started moving more westward on February 16. On February 17, the low came in close proximity to Palau and shortly later, the system was upgraded to a tropical depression by the Joint Typhoon Warning Center. On February 18, the depression was promptly upgraded to a tropical storm, receiving the name Thelma. Later that day on its westward trajectory, slightly heading north, the storm reached its peak intensity with 1 minute sustained winds of 75 km/h (47 mph) and pressure levels of 1000 hPa. Shortly after reaching its peak, Thelma collapsed into a tropical depression and dissipated shortly thereafter. Overall, no damages were reported.

=== Tropical Storm Vera (Daling) ===
Peak intensity estimates
Agency	Wind (kt)	Pressure (hPa)
CMA	38	1004
HKO	40	1004
JMA	—N/a	1004
JTWC	40	—N/a

- Tropical storm (JMA)
- Tropical storm (SSHWS)
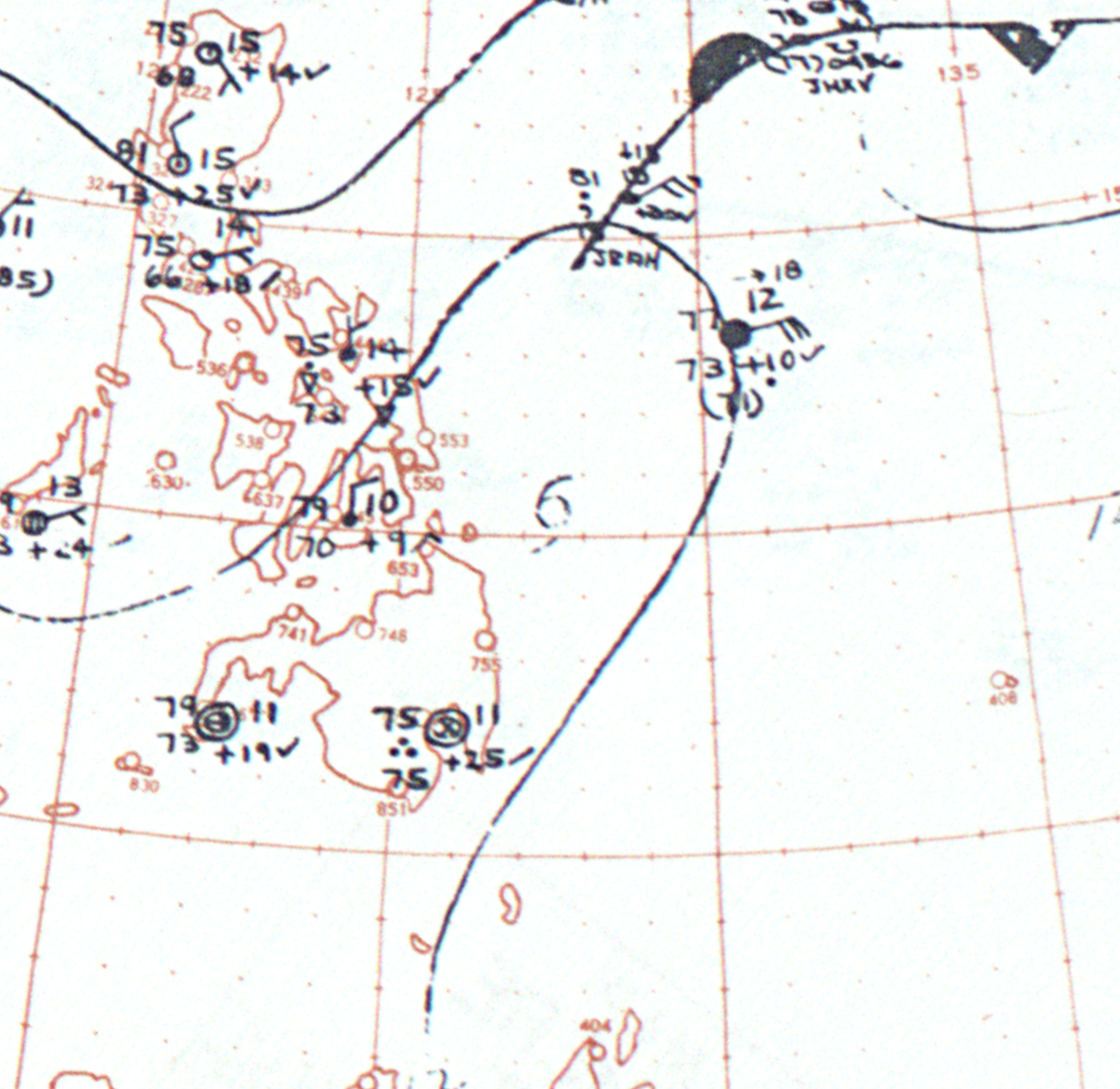
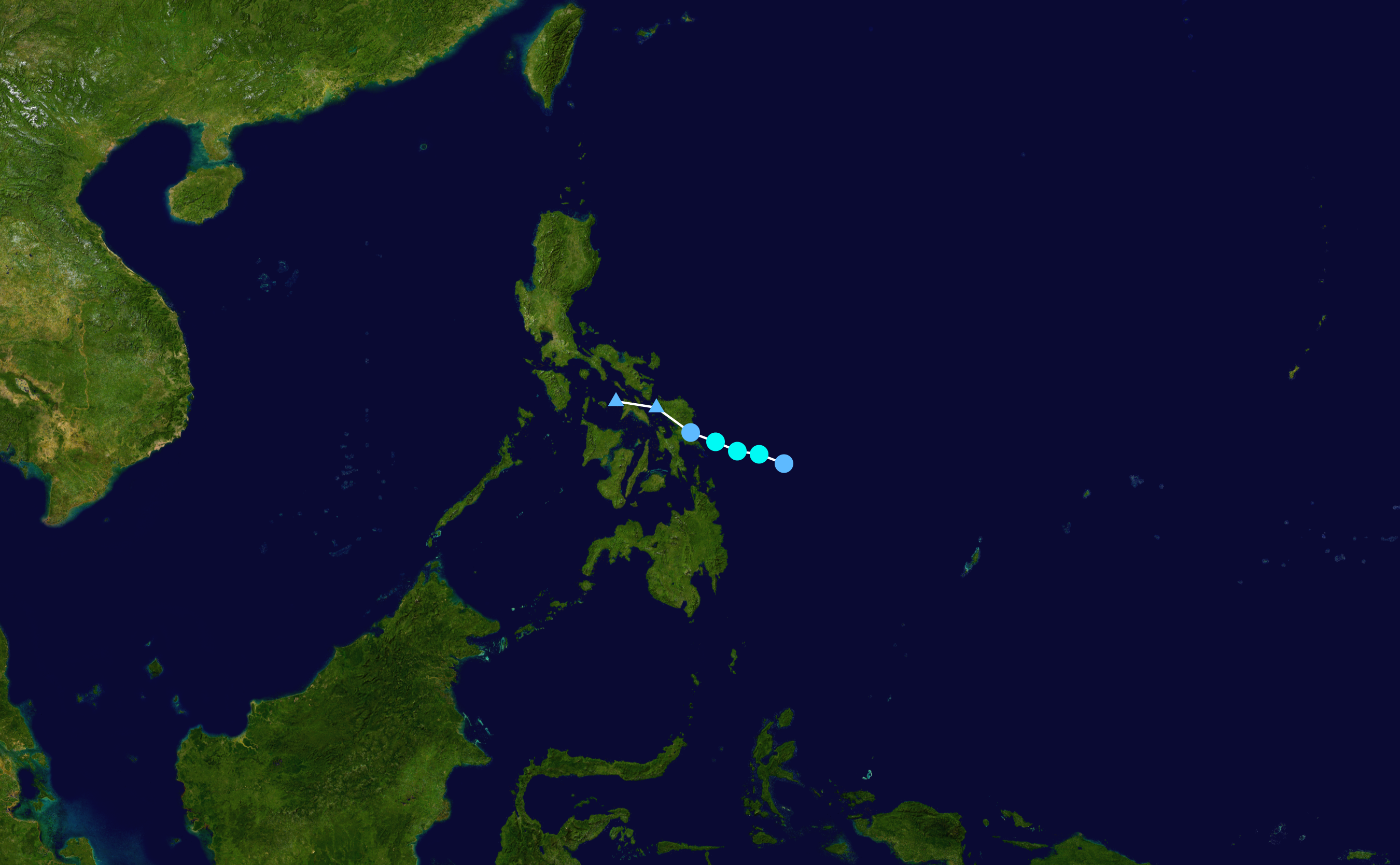
- Duration: March 6 – March 7
- Peak intensity: 75 km/h (45 mph) (1-min); 1004 hPa (mbar)

A low pressure system was spotted by various agencies approaching the Philippines on March 6. A brief 6 hours before being first identified, the depression was upgraded to a tropical storm and assigned the name Vera by the Joint Typhoon Warning Center. That same day, the storm reached its peak intensity with winds of 75 km/h (47 mph) and pressure levels of 1004 hPa. Simultaneously, the storm made landfall in the Philippine island of Samar as a tropical storm. Upon landfall, the system collapsed into a tropical depression, later an extratropical cyclone and shortly after, dissipated over the Philippines. Despite its short duration and landfall, damages to any region is unknown.

=== Typhoon Wanda ===
Peak intensity estimates
Agency	Wind (kt)	Pressure (hPa)
CMA	38	1004
HKO	40	997
JMA	—N/a	996
JTWC	65	—N/a

- Severe tropical storm (JMA)
- Category 1 typhoon (SSHWS)
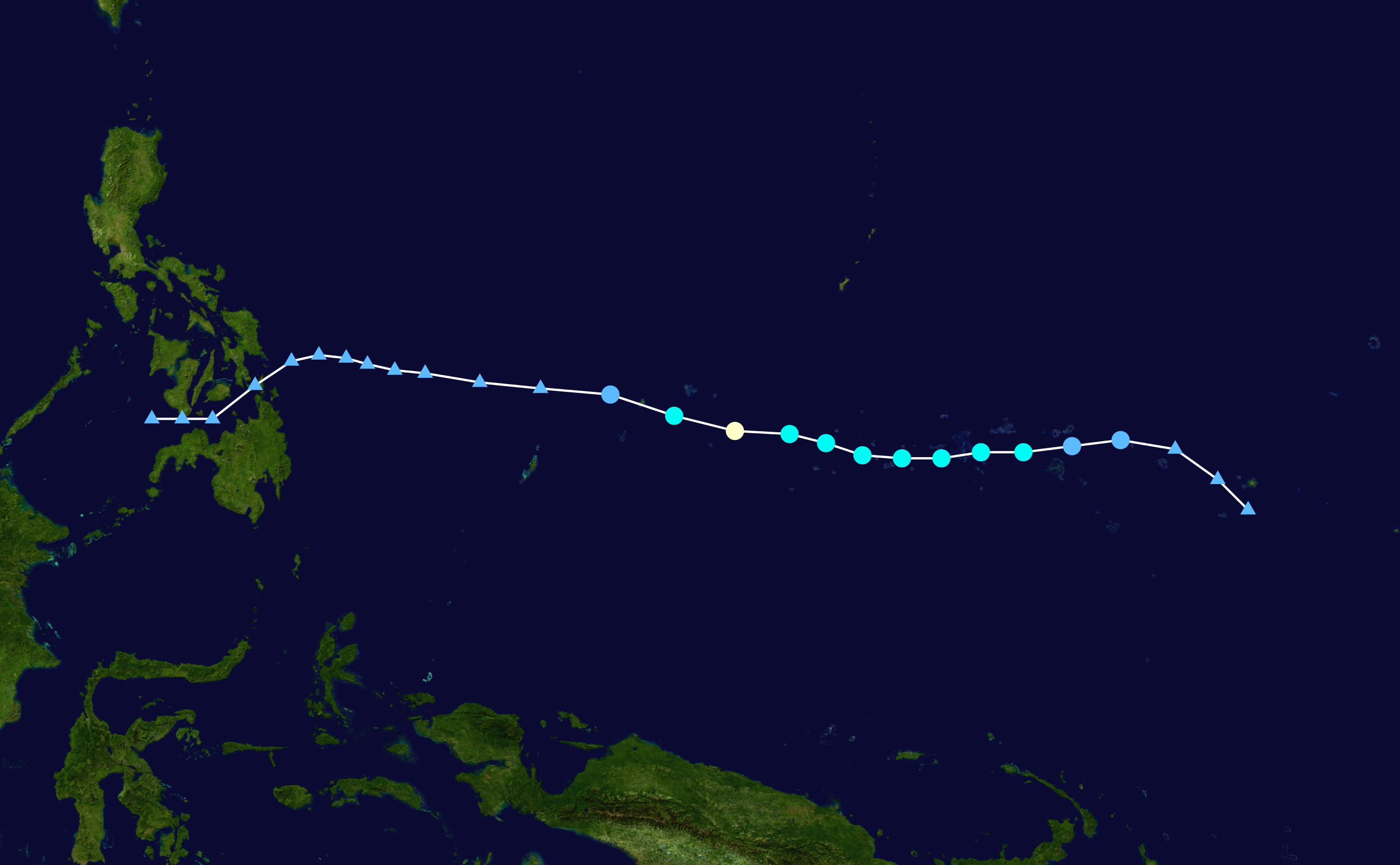
- Duration: April 11 – April 14
- Peak intensity: 120 km/h (75 mph) (1-min); 996 hPa (mbar)

On April 11, an area of mass divergence at 200 hPa was located, being fed inflow from the Southern Hemisphere at low and mid altitudes. As a result, a low pressure system was promptly identified when situated around Micronesia. A brief 18 hours later, that same day, the system was officially classified as a tropical depression by the Joint Typhoon Warning Center, officially noted to drift towards the northwest when doing so. On April 12, after moving mostly west and slightly southward, the depression was upgraded to a tropical storm, promptly receiving the name Wanda. The storm gradually moved to the west on its approach towards the Philippines and it started producing slight northward momentum, as it slowly intensified. On April 14, the typhoon reached its peak intensity with winds of 120 km/h (75 mph) and pressure levels of 996 hPa. Quickly after doing so, the typhoon rapidly weakened, collapsing into a tropical storm, and eventually an extratropical cyclone in just 18 hours. The storm moved NNW, then turned to the SW on April 16 and dissipated later that day as it moved over a mid level anticyclonic flow.

=== Typhoon Amy (Elang) ===
Peak intensity estimates
Agency	Wind (kt)	Pressure (hPa)
CMA	97	976
HKO	90	975
JMA	—N/a	976
JTWC	100	—N/a

- Typhoon (JMA)
- Category 3 typhoon (SSHWS)
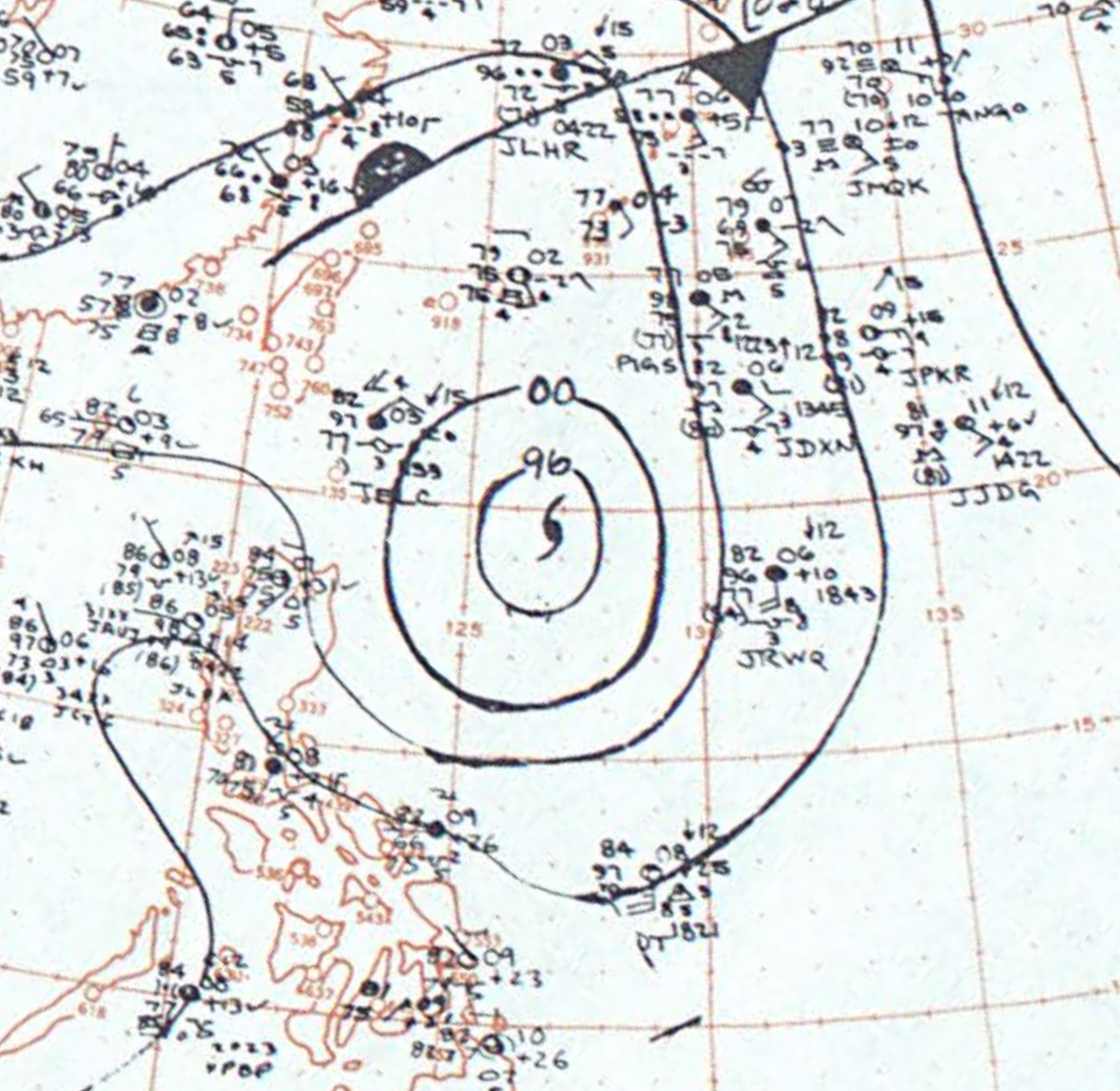
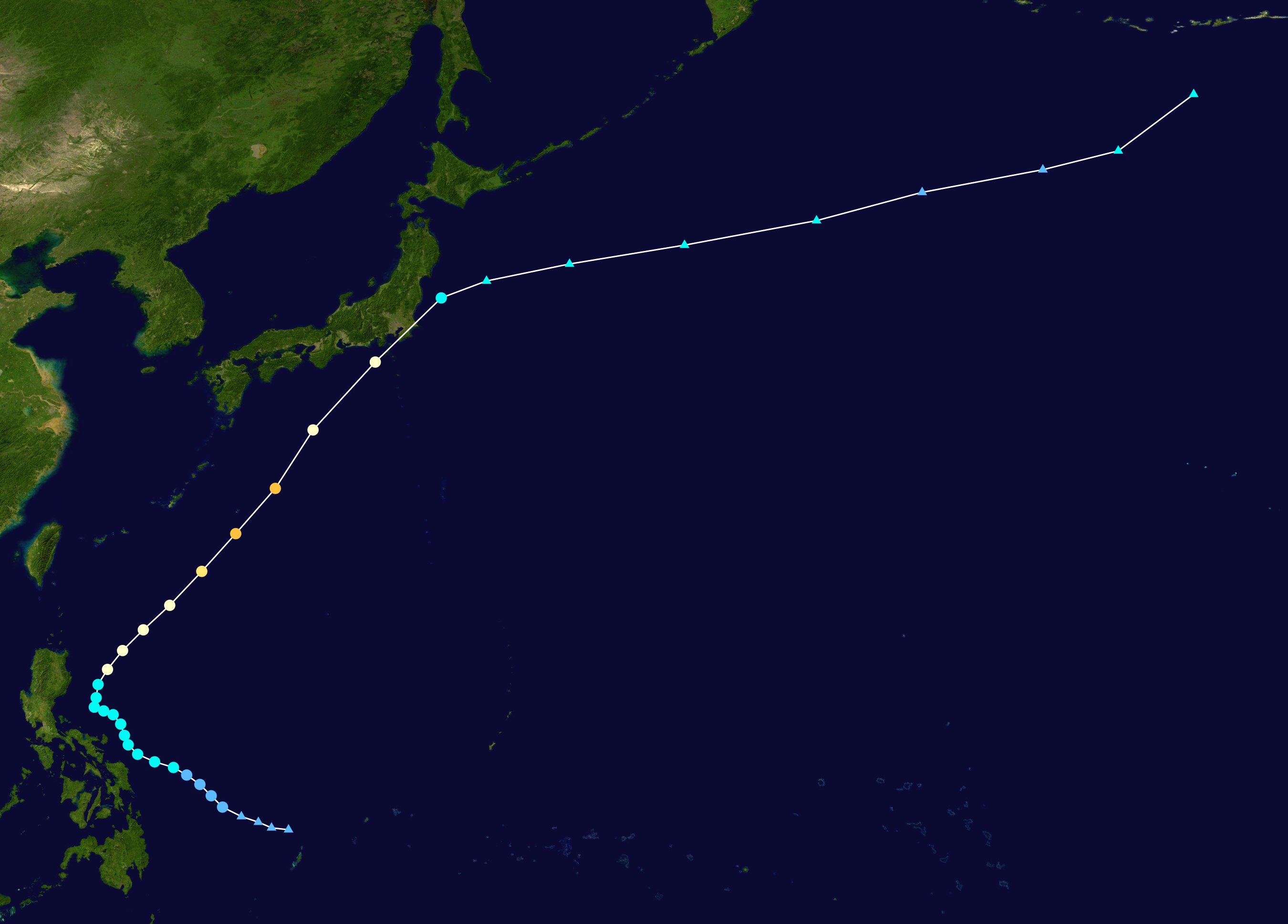
- Duration: May 21 – May 27
- Peak intensity: 185 km/h (115 mph) (1-min); 976 hPa (mbar)

On May 20, a low pressure system was spotted hovering north of Palau. Because of low-to-mid inflow originating from the Southern Hemisphere, this allowed the formation of a tropical depression, promptly classified by the Joint Typhoon Warning Center on May 21. On May 22, the depression was upgraded to a tropical storm, receiving the name Amy. The gradually intensifying system moved somewhat erratically to the northwest when just east of the Philippines, turning to the north on May 23 and then back mostly west later that day. On May 24, near the island of Luzon, Amy took a sharp turn towards the north, later adjusting to move towards the northeast. Early on May 25, the storm was promptly upgraded to a Category 1 typhoon as it started accelerating and deepening. Ultimately, the typhoon began a phase of rapid intensification, where it reached its peak intensity on May 26, with winds of 185 km/h (115 mph) and pressure levels of 976 hPa. Additionally, it was noted that the typhoon, despite being intense, was compact, shallow and very fast moving at this stage. Briefly afterwards, the typhoon began to weaken, where it made a notable landfall near Tokyo as a Category 1 typhoon on May 27. Later that day, the typhoon collapsed into an extratropical cyclone, meandered in an eastward manner in the northern Pacific Ocean and dissipated on May 29.

=== Tropical Depression 08W ===
- Tropical depression (SSHWS)
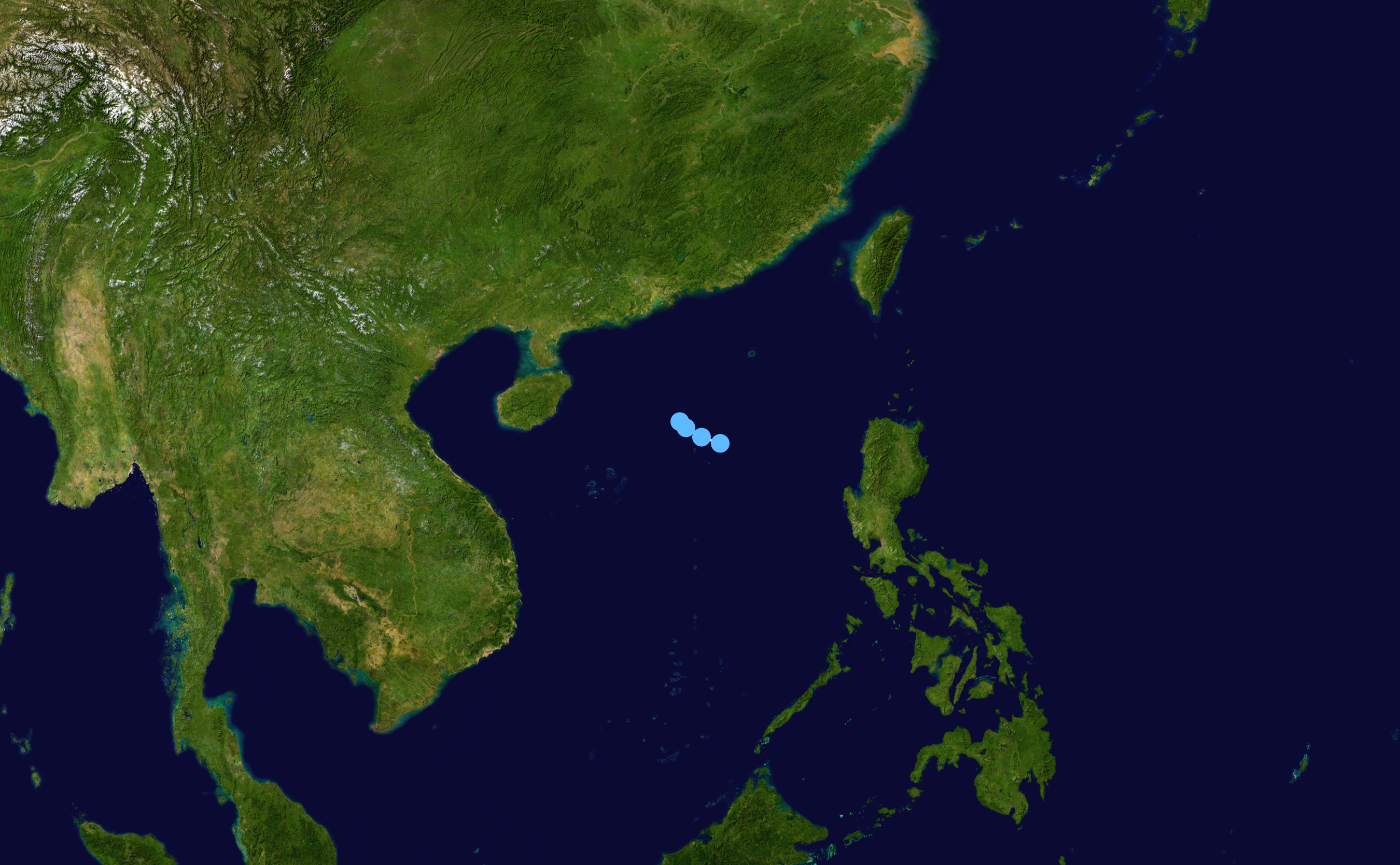
- Duration: May 29 – May 30
- Peak intensity: 45 km/h (30 mph) (1-min); 1003 hPa (mbar)

A tropical depression was spotted by the Joint Typhoon Warning Center on May 29, designating it 08W. During its existence, the agency estimated the depression had winds of 45 km/h (28 mph) and pressure levels of approximately 1003 hPa. The next day, just 24 hours since it was first located, the depression quickly collapsed and dissipated.

=== Typhoon Babe ===
- Severe tropical storm (JMA)
- Category 1 typhoon (SSHWS)
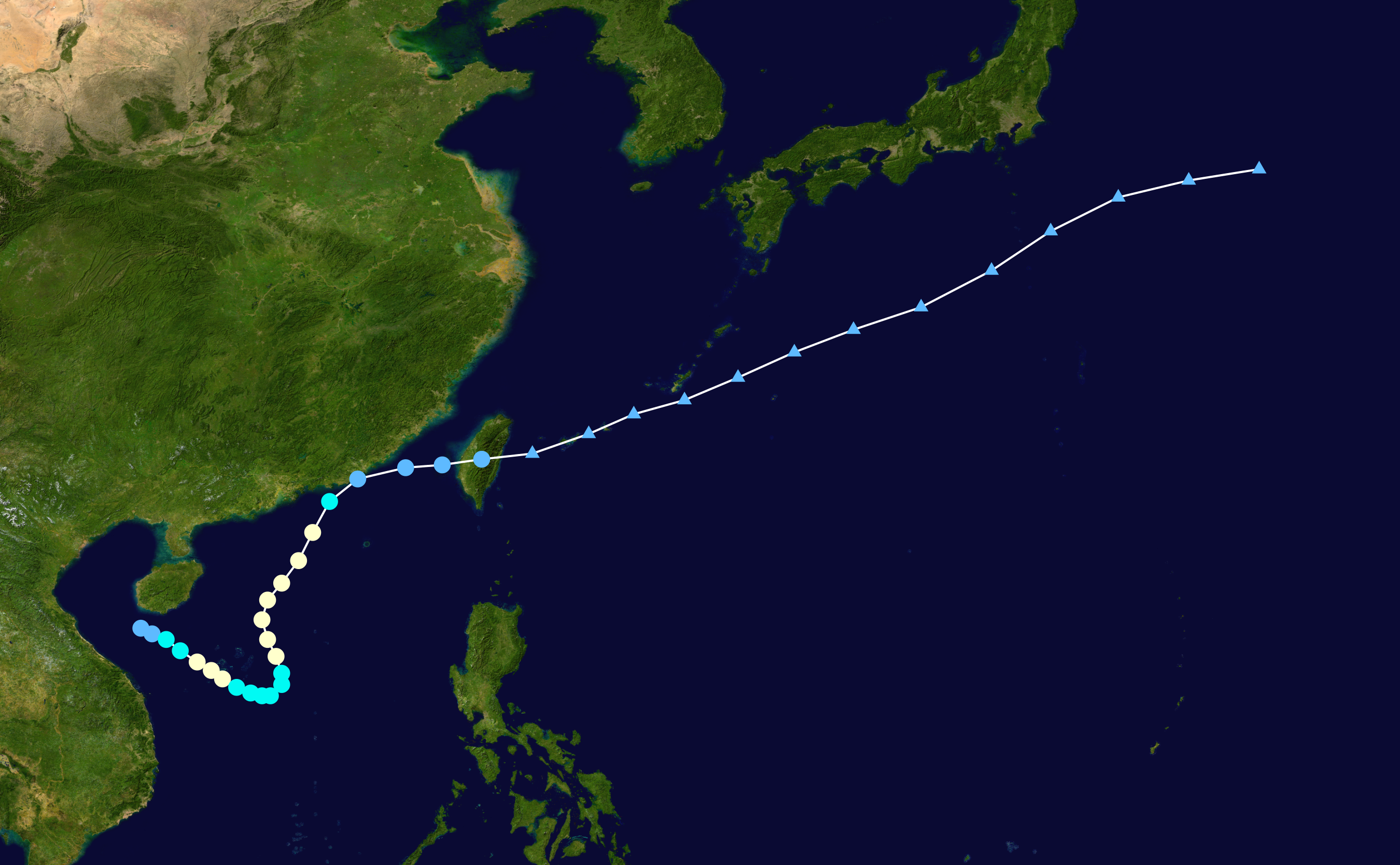
- Duration: May 30 – June 4
- Peak intensity: 150 km/h (90 mph) (1-min); 990 hPa (mbar)

Babe made landfall in China and Taiwan.

=== Typhoon Carla (Goring) ===
- Severe tropical storm (JMA)
- Category 4 typhoon (SSHWS)
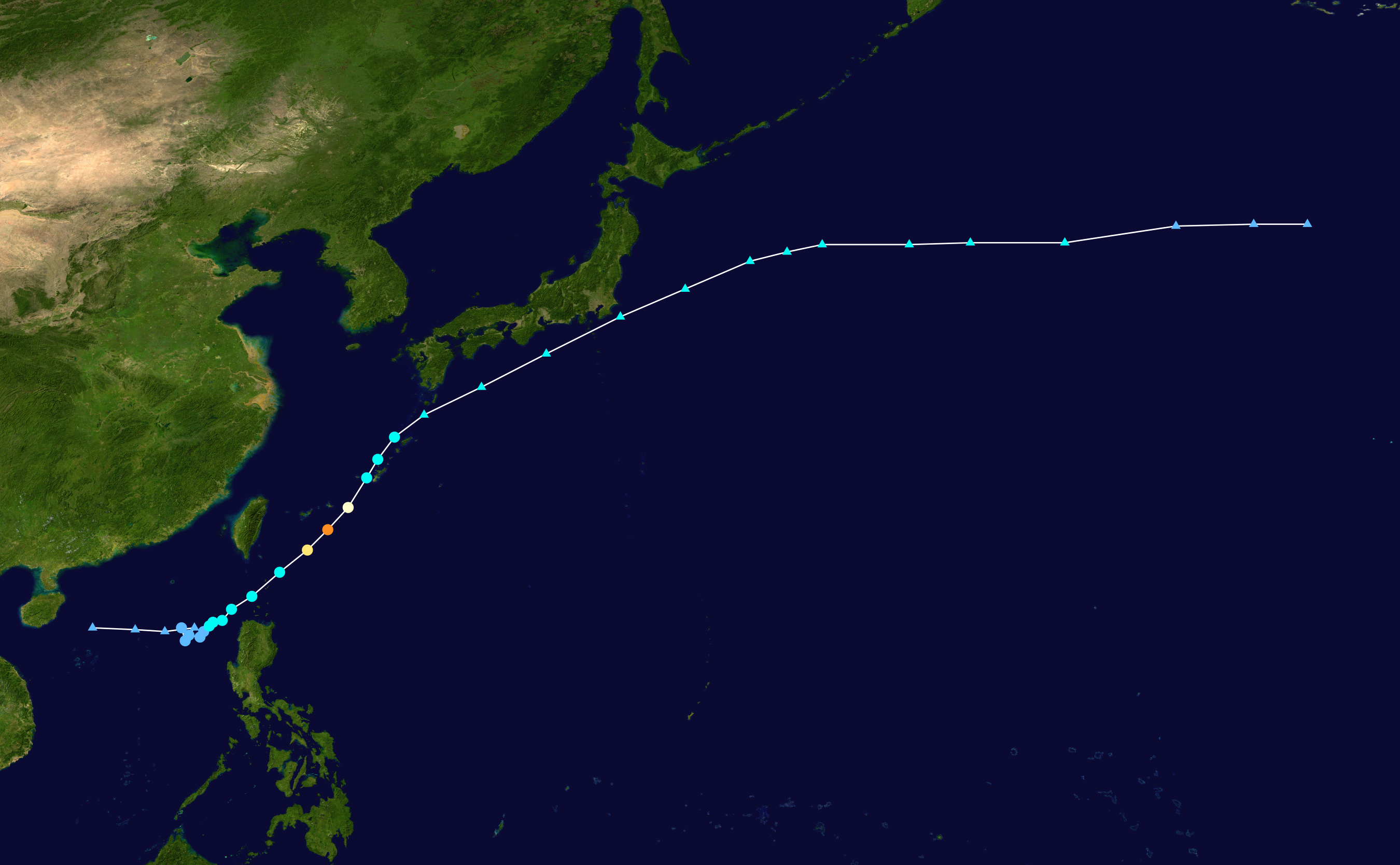
- Duration: May 30 – June 3
- Peak intensity: 220 km/h (140 mph) (1-min); 952 hPa (mbar)

Carla formed with Babe. Carla rapidly intensified on June 1 but then rapidly weakened and then moved northeastward then dissipated on June 3.

=== CMA Tropical Depression 12 ===
- Tropical depression (CMA)
- Tropical depression (SSHWS)
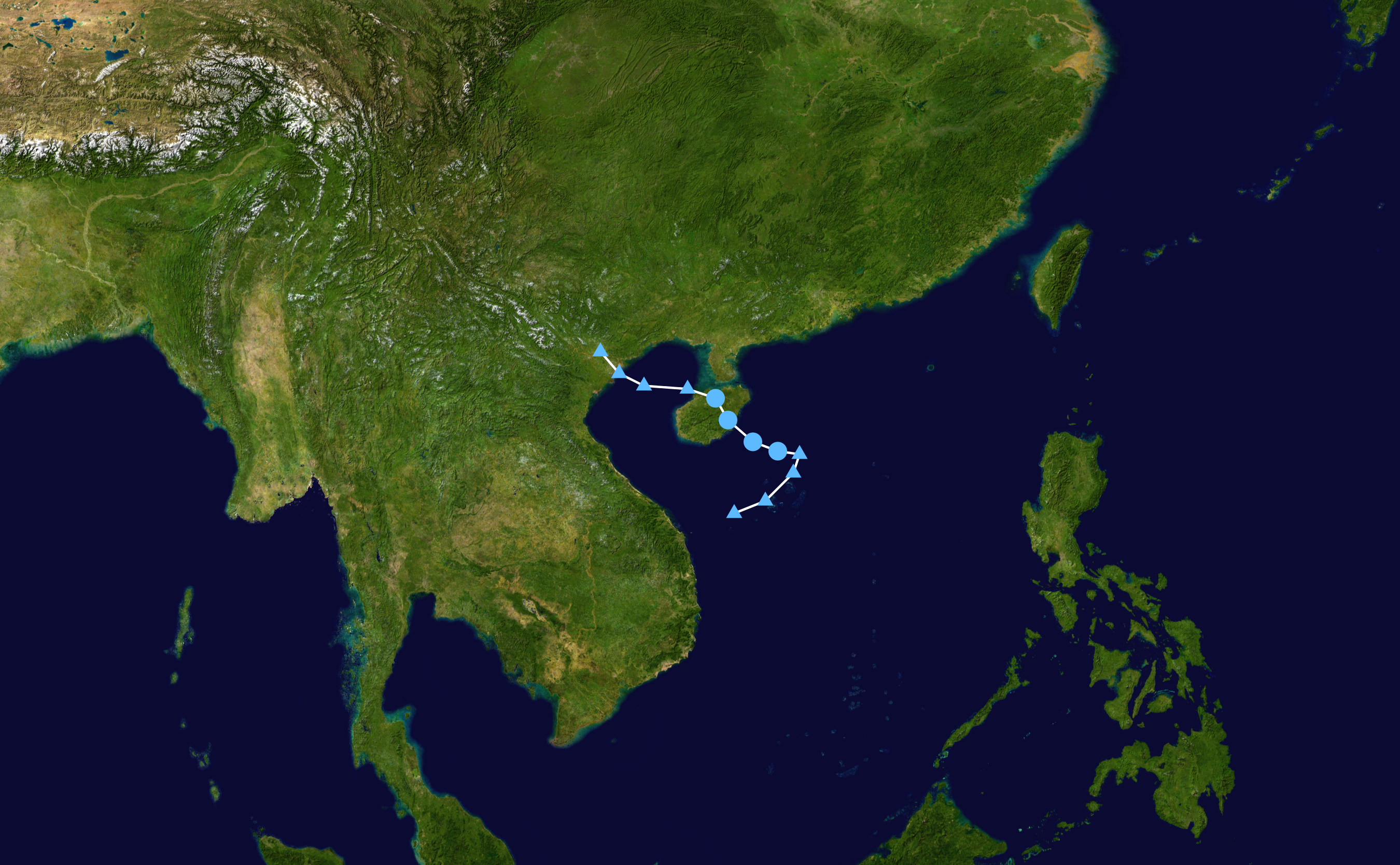
- Duration: June 10 – June 12
- Peak intensity: 45 km/h (30 mph) (10-min); 1000 hPa (mbar)

A tropical disturbance was spotted by the China Meteorological Administration east of Vietnam on June 9. The disturbance started by moving mostly east, curving towards the northeast. On June 10, the disturbance took a sharp turn to the west, whilst at the same time, get designated as a tropical depression by the agency. Shortly thereafter, on a curve to the northwest, the depression reached its peak intensity with 2 minute sustained winds of 45 km/h (28 mph) and pressure of 1000 hPa. On the same day, shortly after its peak, the depression made landfall on the island of Hainan in southern China. On June 11, the depression collapsed into an extratropical cyclone and the following day, dissipated over northern Vietnam. The effects of the depression are unknown in both countries.

=== Super Typhoon Dinah (Huling) ===
- Typhoon (JMA)
- Category 5 super typhoon (SSHWS)
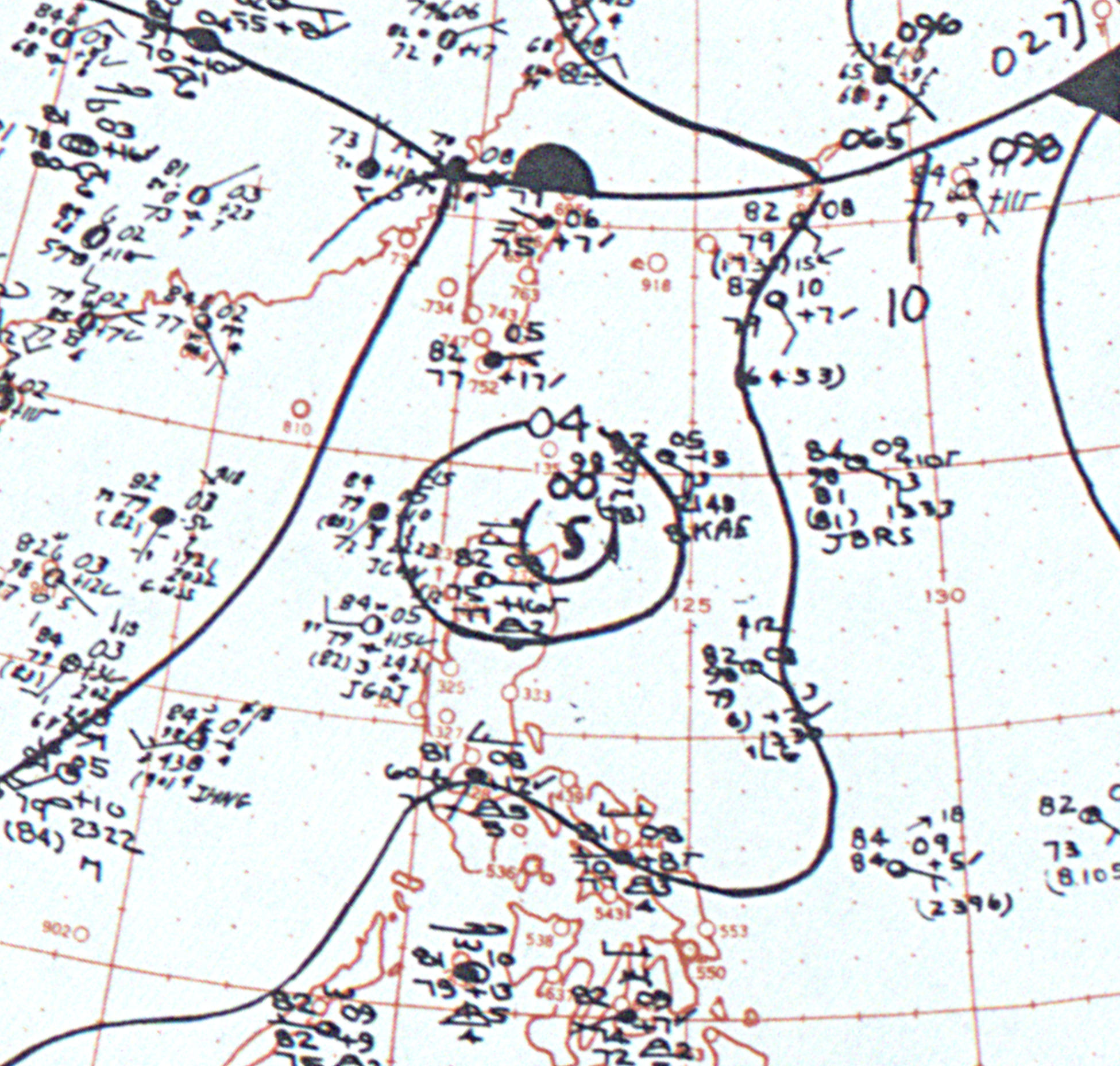
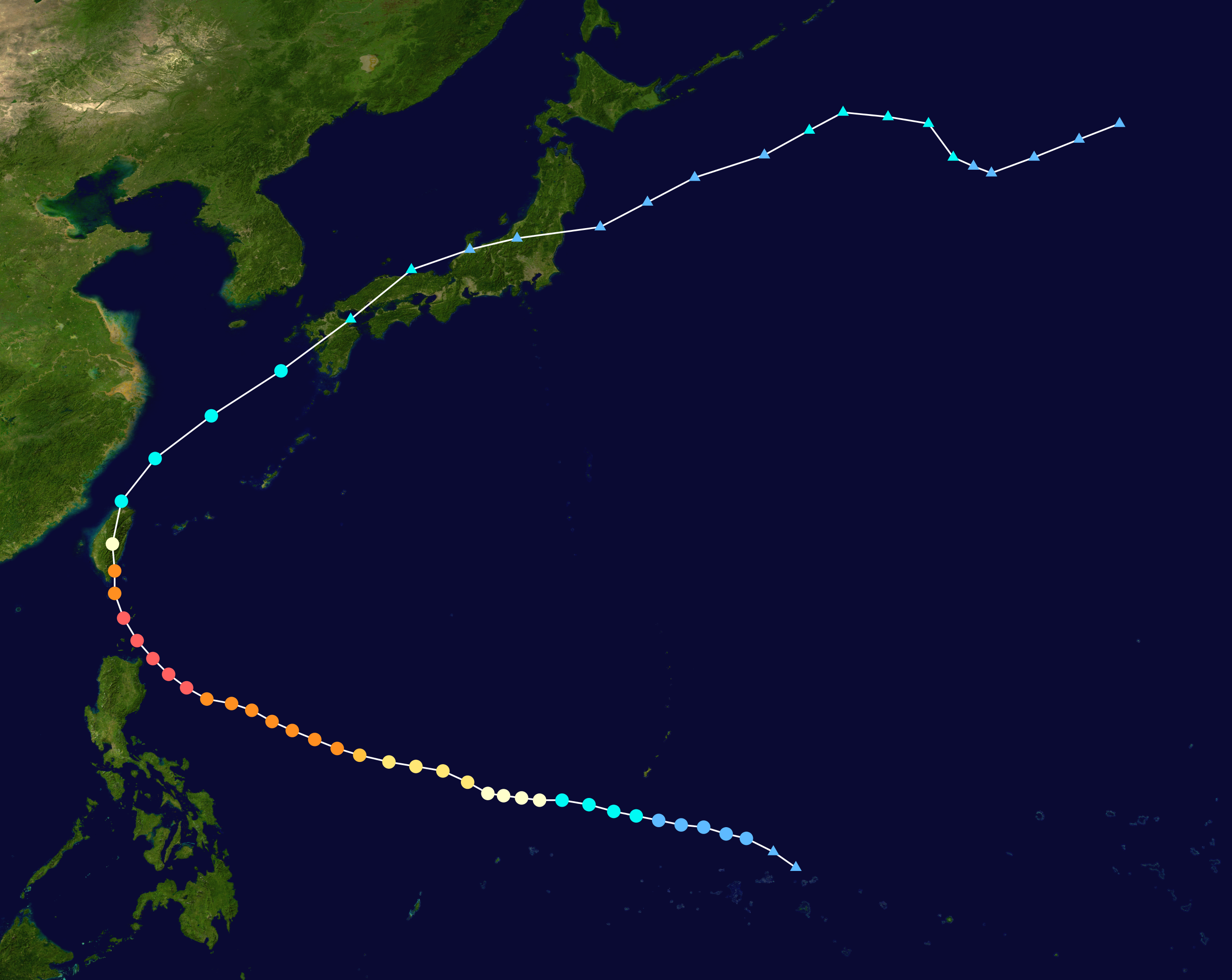
- Duration: June 10 – June 19
- Peak intensity: 295 km/h (185 mph) (1-min); 895 hPa (mbar)

A surge in the southern hemisphere indraft developed into Tropical Depression 11W on June 12 to the east of the Philippines. It tracked west-northwestward, quickly strengthening to a tropical storm that day and a typhoon on the 13th. Dinah continued to quickly intensify as it turned to the northwest, and attained a peak of 185 mph on the 17th to the northeast of Luzon. Its southerly inflow was cut off, and Dinah weakened as it turned to the north. It hit southern Taiwan on the 18th as a 140 mph typhoon, and weakened greatly over the island to a tropical storm. At this time, Dinah exhibited a rare false radar eye. Dinah turned to the northeast, where it became extratropical near Japan on June 20. The storm killed 45 people on its path, and destroyed 5000 homes on Taiwan.

=== Tropical Storm Emma (Ibiang) ===
- Tropical storm (JMA)
- Tropical storm (SSHWS)
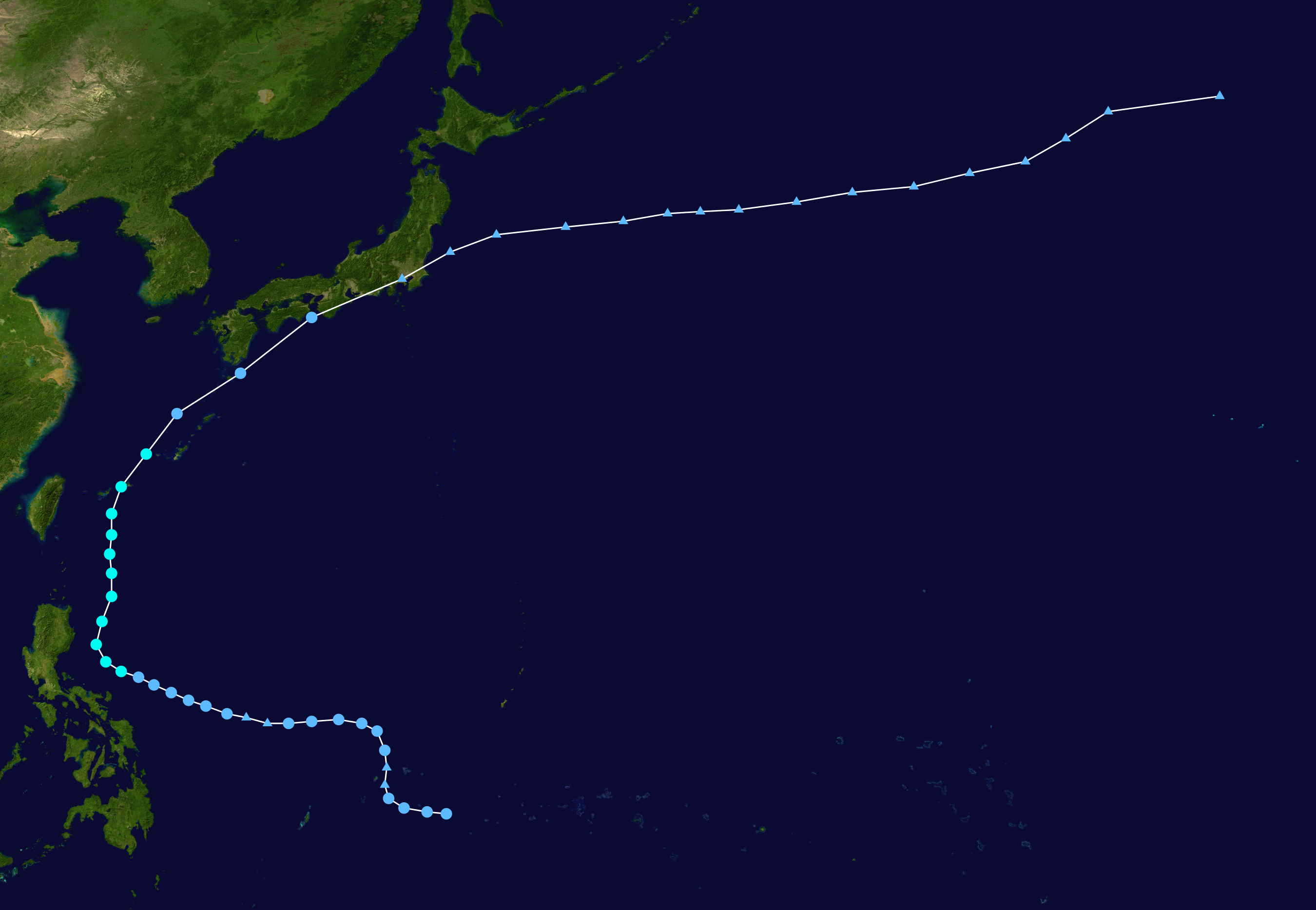
- Duration: June 19 – June 26
- Peak intensity: 95 km/h (60 mph) (1-min); 996 hPa (mbar)

Emma affected the Philippines, Taiwan, Japan.

=== CMA Tropical Depression 15 ===
- Tropical depression (CMA)
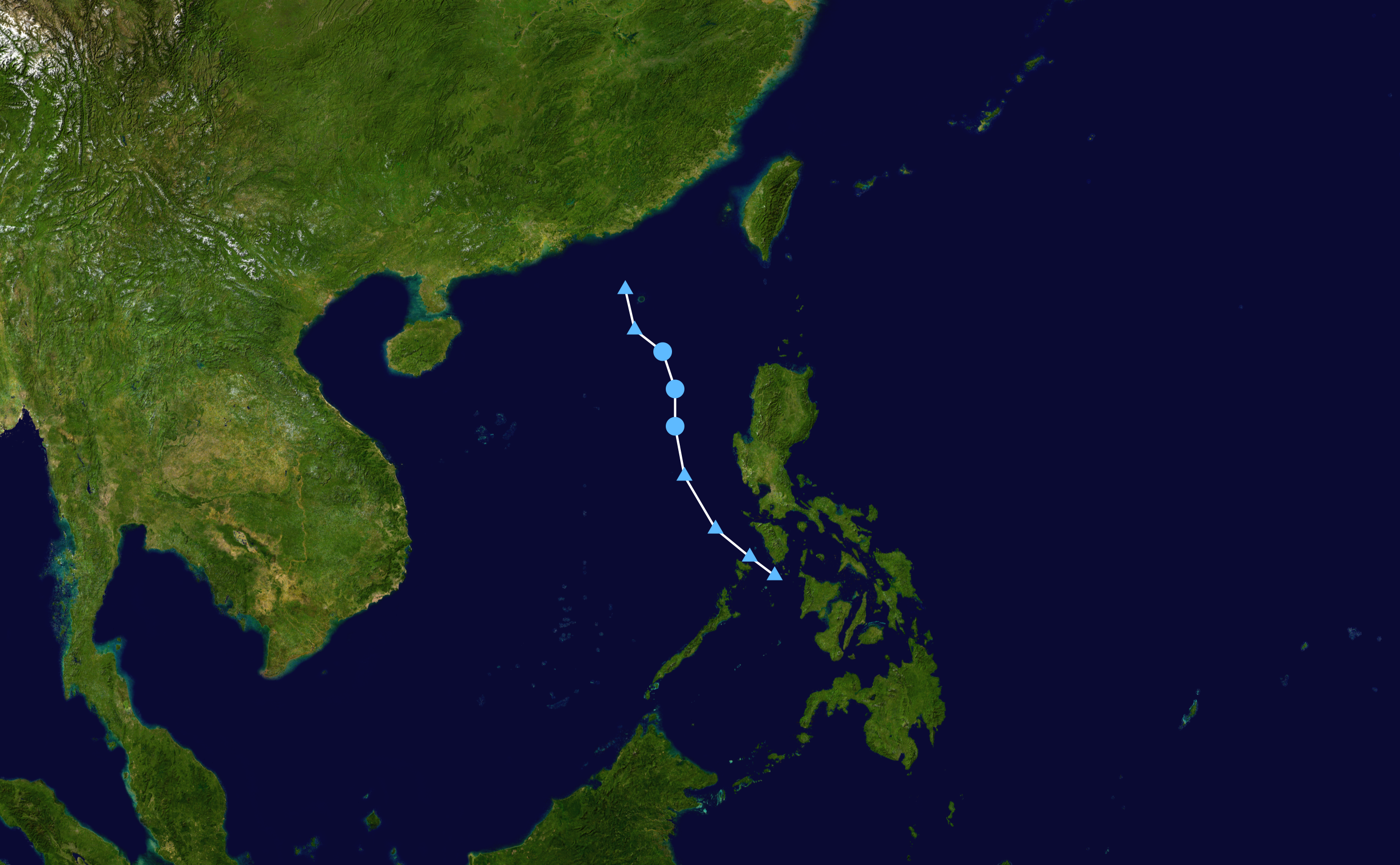
- Duration: July 2 – July 2
- Peak intensity: 55 km/h (35 mph) (10-min); 1004 hPa (mbar)

This is the tropical depression only tracked by CMA.

=== CMA Tropical Depression 16 ===
- Tropical depression (CMA)
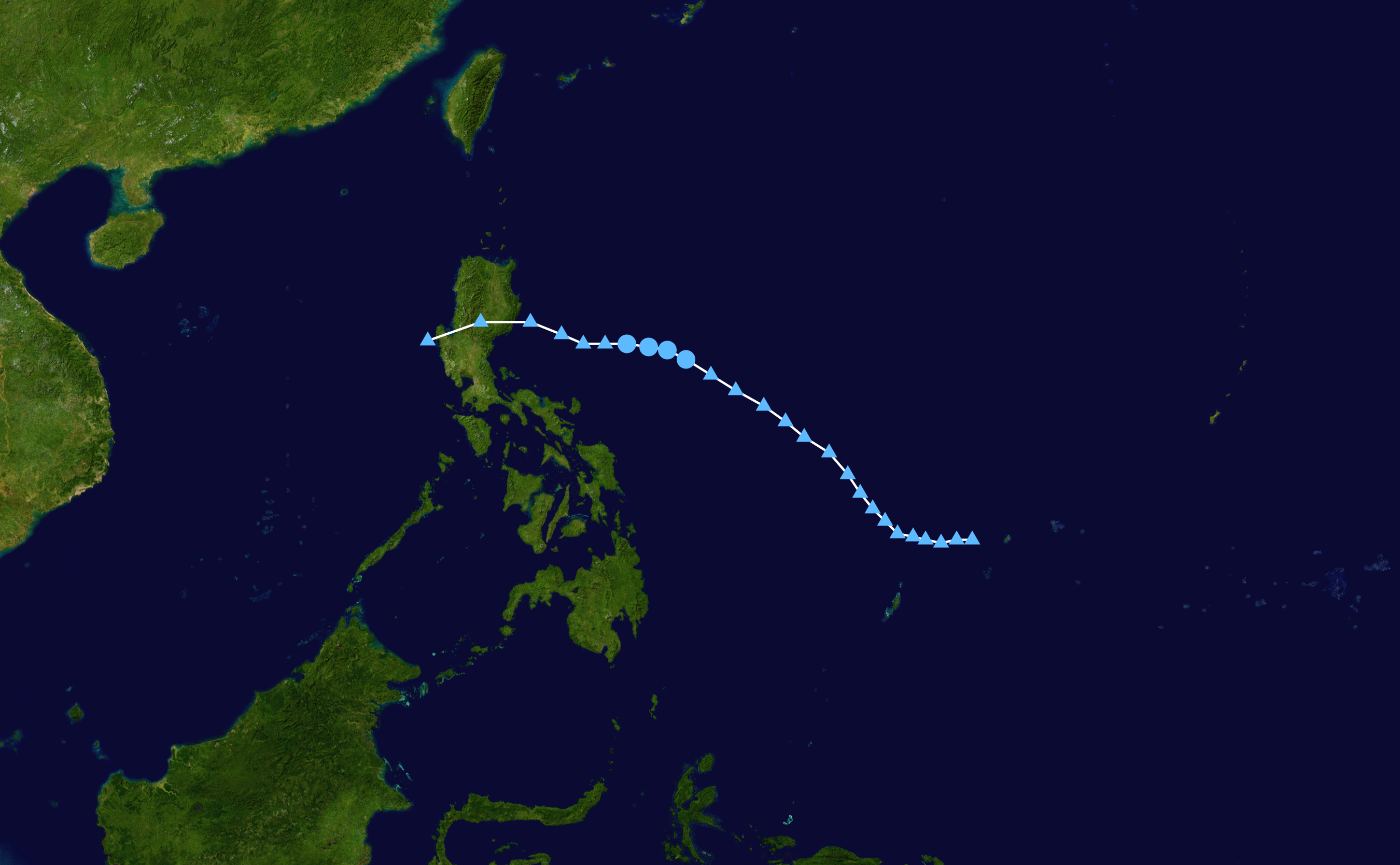
- Duration: July 6 – July 8
- Peak intensity: 55 km/h (35 mph) (10-min); 1002 hPa (mbar)

=== Tropical Depression 13W (Luming) ===
- Tropical storm (PAGASA)
- Tropical depression (SSHWS)
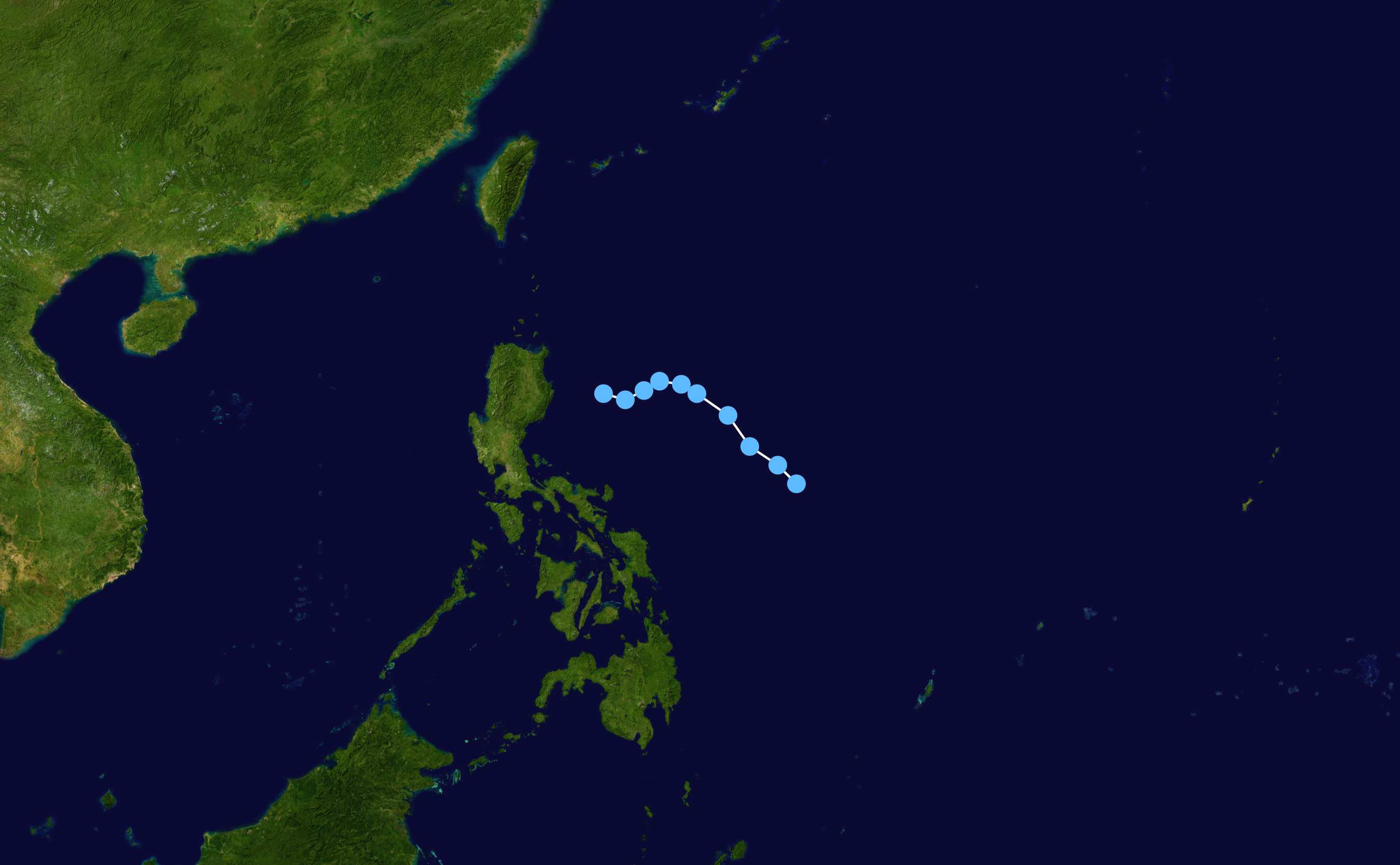
- Duration: July 6 – July 9
- Peak intensity: 65 km/h (40 mph) (10-min); 1004 hPa (mbar)

13W is also known as Tropical Storm Luming by PAGASA.

=== Super Typhoon Freda (Miling) ===
- Typhoon (JMA)
- Category 5 super typhoon (SSHWS)
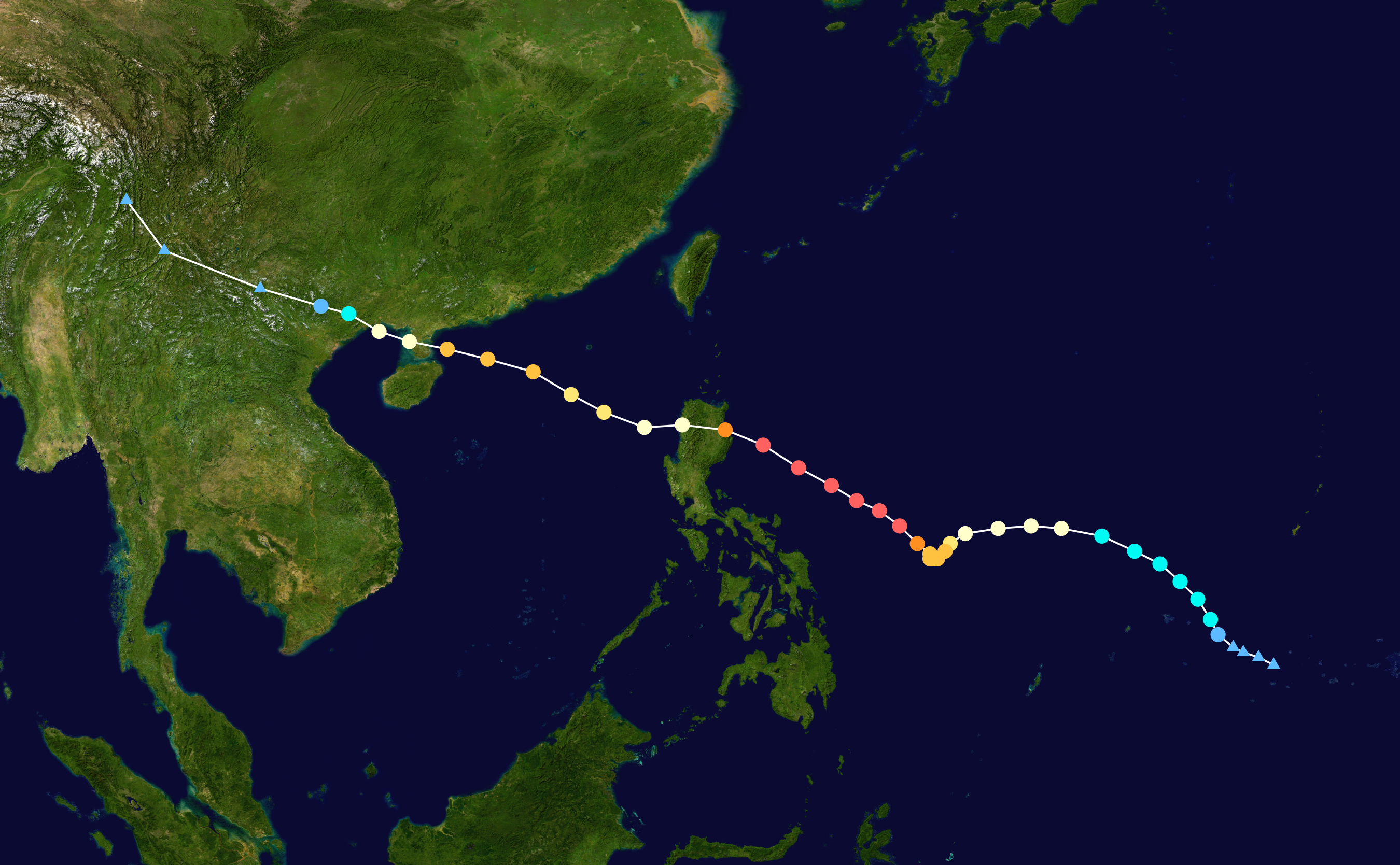
- Duration: July 6 – July 16
- Peak intensity: 260 km/h (160 mph) (1-min); 925 hPa (mbar)

160 mph Super Typhoon Freda, which began its life on July 6, hit northern Luzon on the 13th. It crossed the island and the South China Sea, where it hit Hainan Island as a 115 mph typhoon on the 15th. Freda dissipated the next day over China, after causing heavy flooding killing an unknown number of people. In Hong Kong, Freda killed 2 people.

=== CMA Tropical Depression 18 ===
- Tropical depression (CMA)
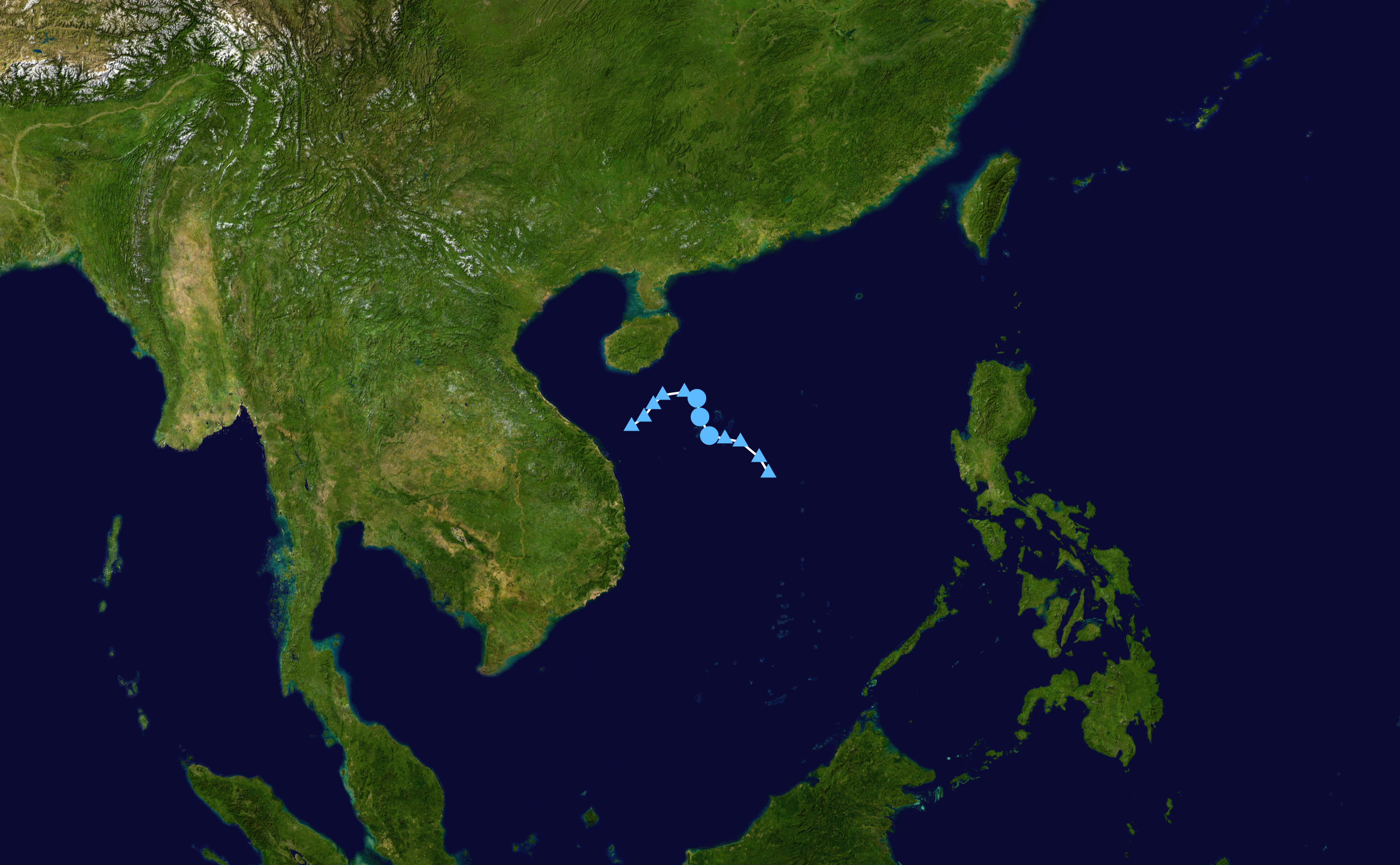
- Duration: July 10 – July 11
- Peak intensity: 45 km/h (30 mph) (10-min); 999 hPa (mbar)

The depression stayed away from land, yet it did not last long.

=== Tropical Storm Gilda (Narsing) ===
- Severe tropical storm (JMA)
- Tropical storm (SSHWS)
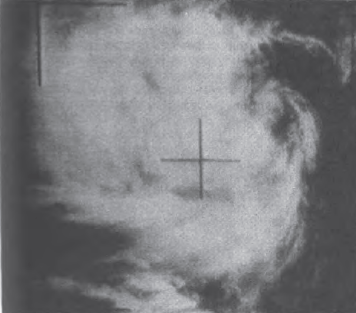
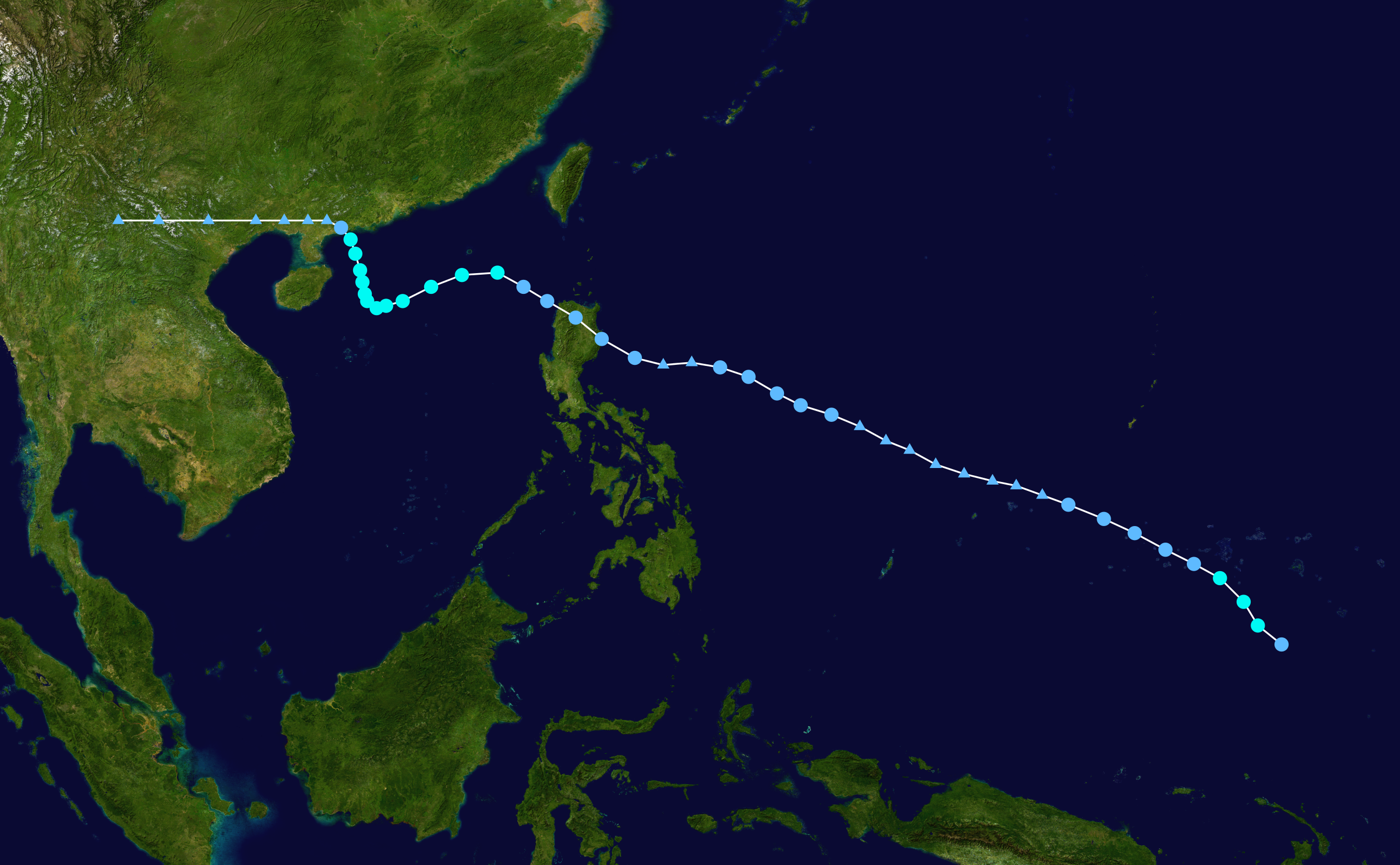
- Duration: July 12 – July 24
- Peak intensity: 110 km/h (70 mph) (1-min); 985 hPa (mbar)

Gilda did not last long, although it caused some damage.

=== CMA Tropical Depression 20 ===
- Tropical depression (CMA)
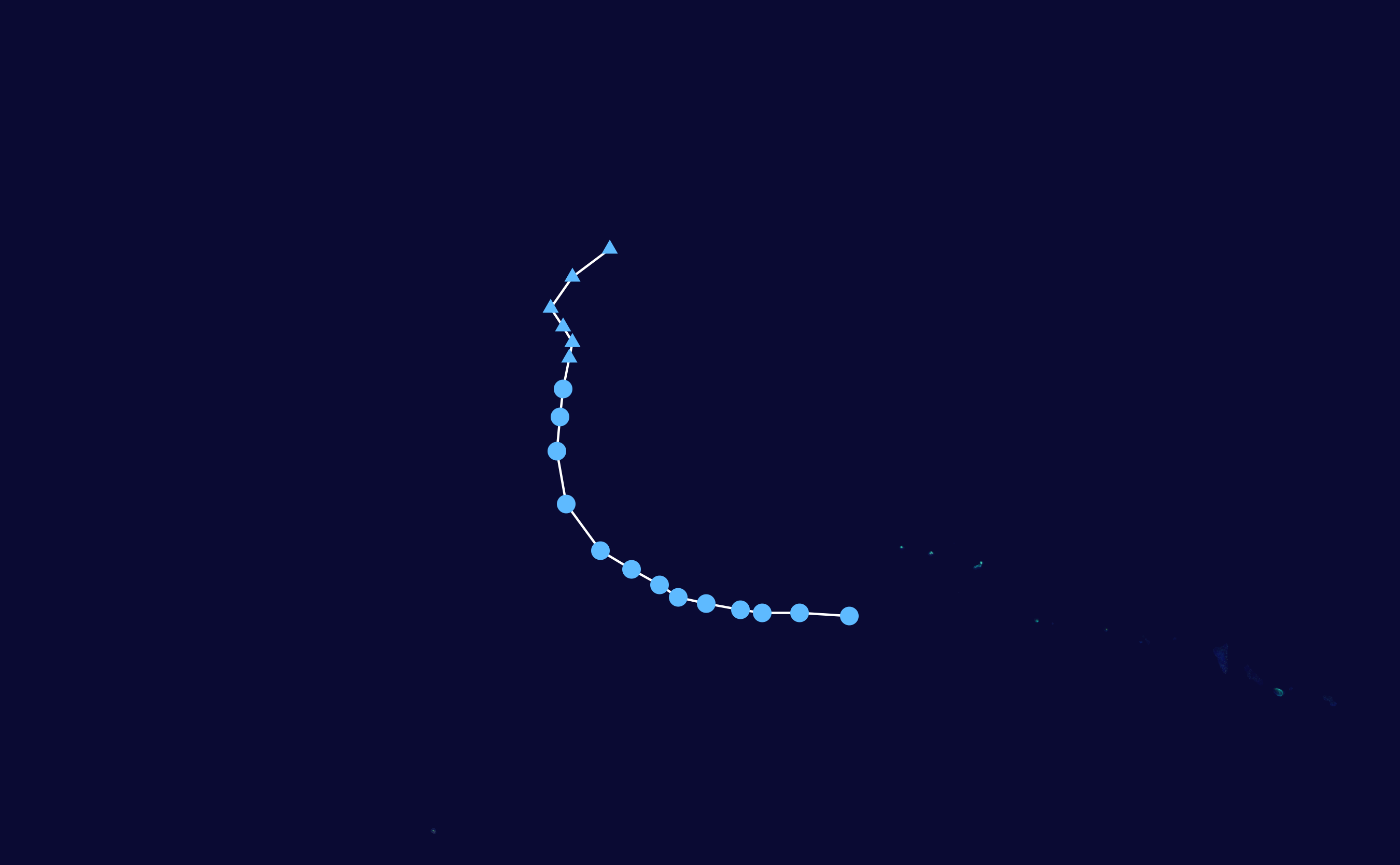
- Duration: July 17 – July 20
- Peak intensity: 55 km/h (35 mph) (10-min);

The depression did not last long.

=== Typhoon Harriet (Openg) ===
- Typhoon (JMA)
- Category 3 typhoon (SSHWS)
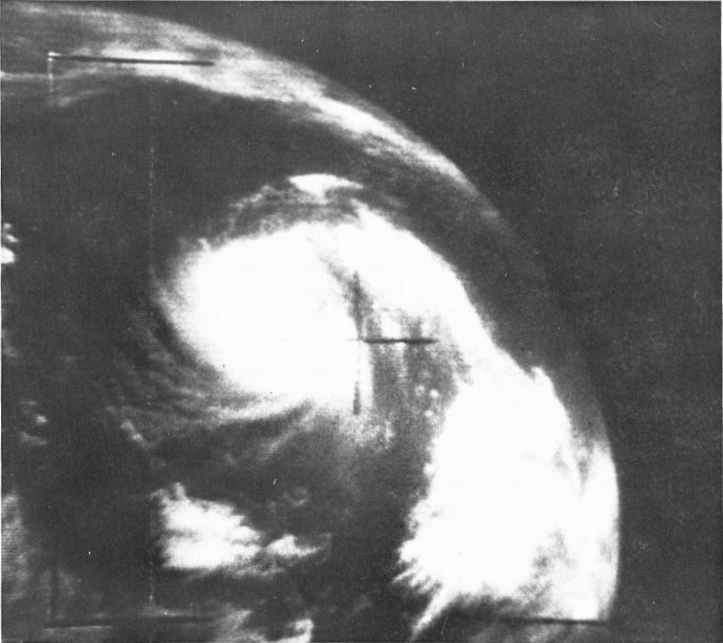
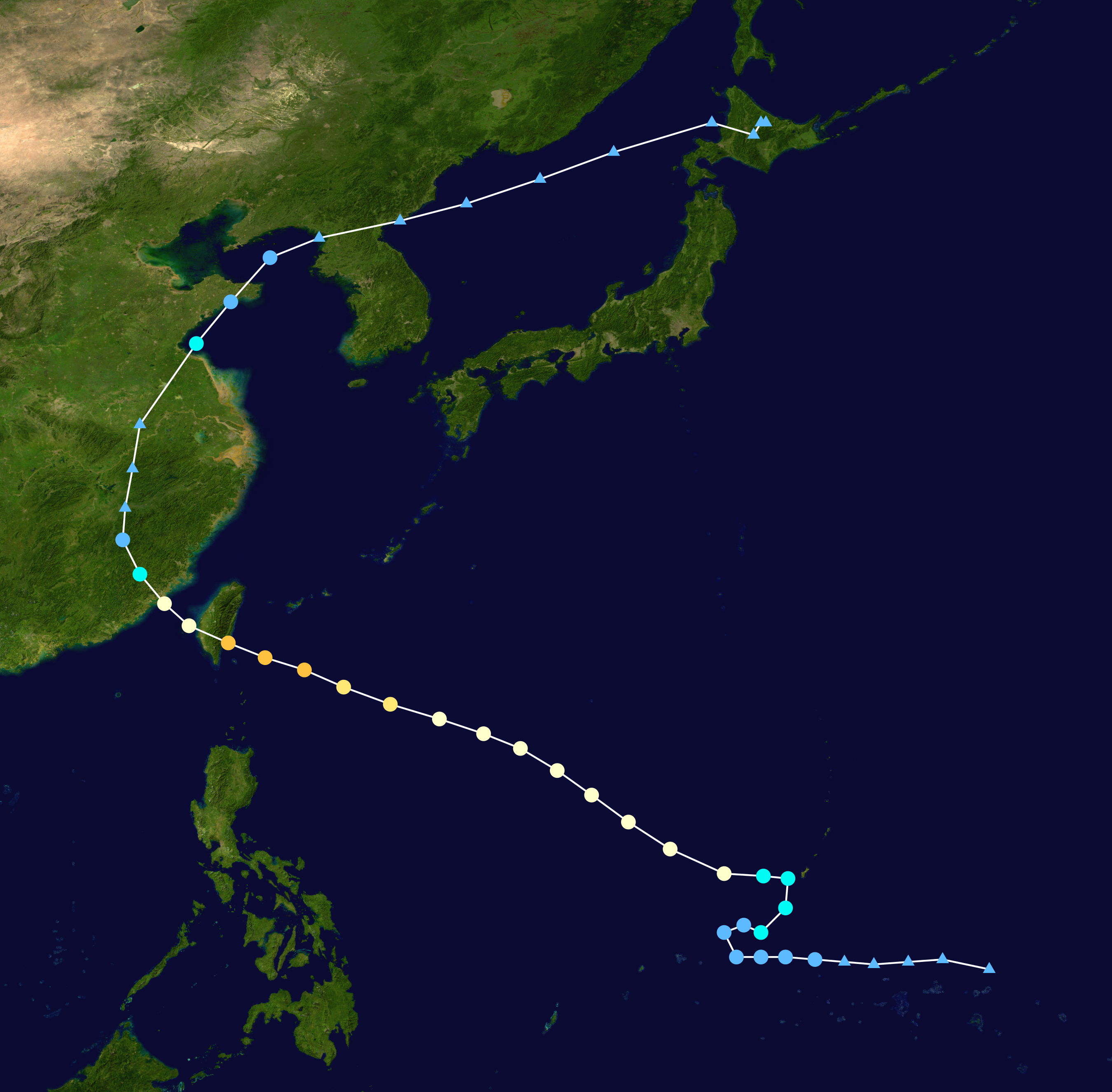
- Duration: July 20 – July 28
- Peak intensity: 185 km/h (115 mph) (1-min); 970 hPa (mbar)

Harriet hit Taiwan as a Category 3 typhoon.

=== Super Typhoon Jean (Rubing) ===
- Typhoon (JMA)
- Category 5 super typhoon (SSHWS)
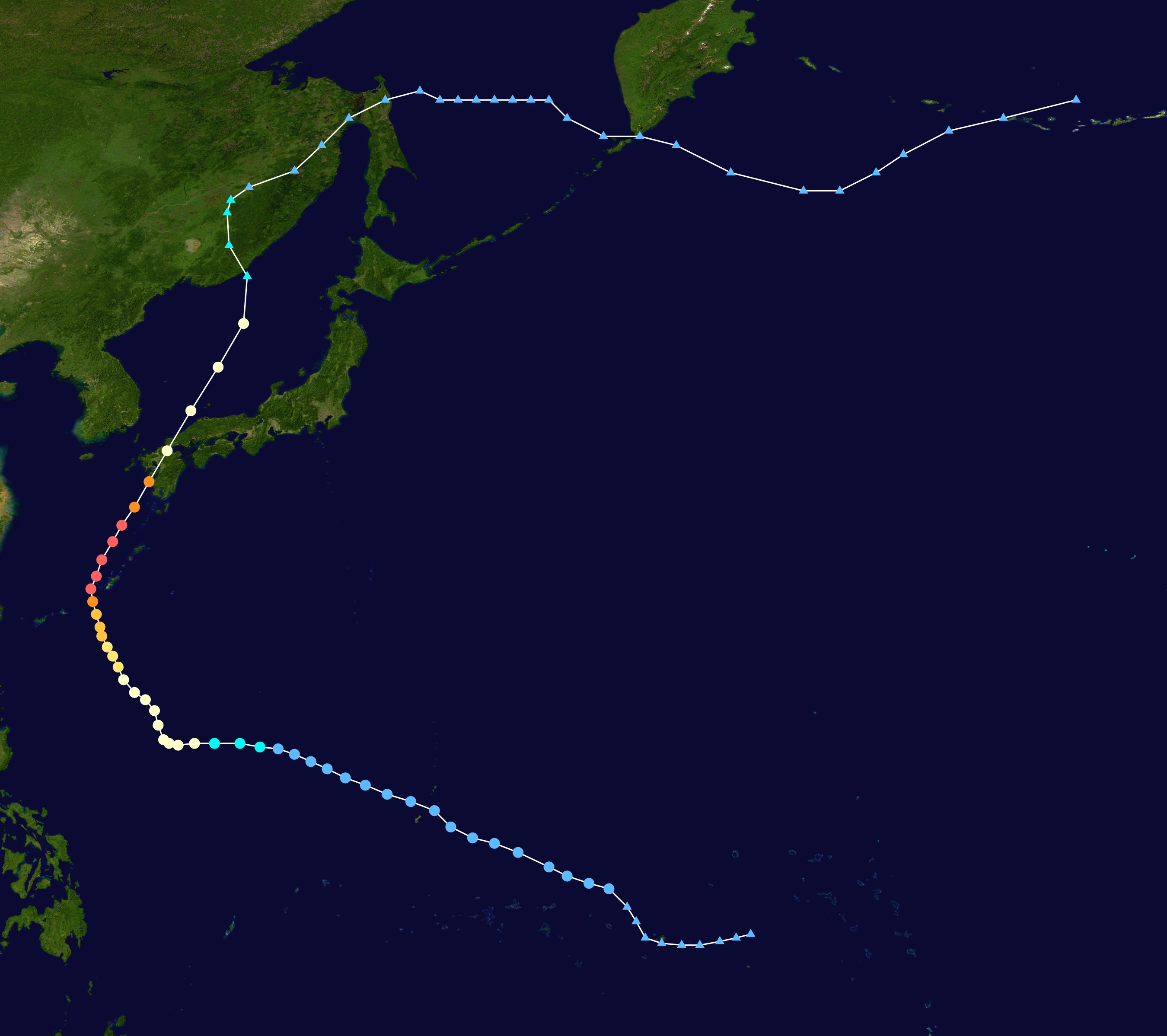
- Duration: July 26 – August 6
- Peak intensity: 260 km/h (160 mph) (1-min); 920 hPa (mbar)

Super Typhoon Jean, after reaching a peak of 160 mph on August 3, weakened slightly to hit southwestern Japan as a 150 mph super typhoon on August 5. The typhoon brought heavy winds to Southern Japan before becoming extratropical on the 7th. Typhoon Jean killed 28 people throughout Southern Japan.

=== Typhoon Ivy (Pining) ===
- Typhoon (JMA)
- Category 1 typhoon (SSHWS)
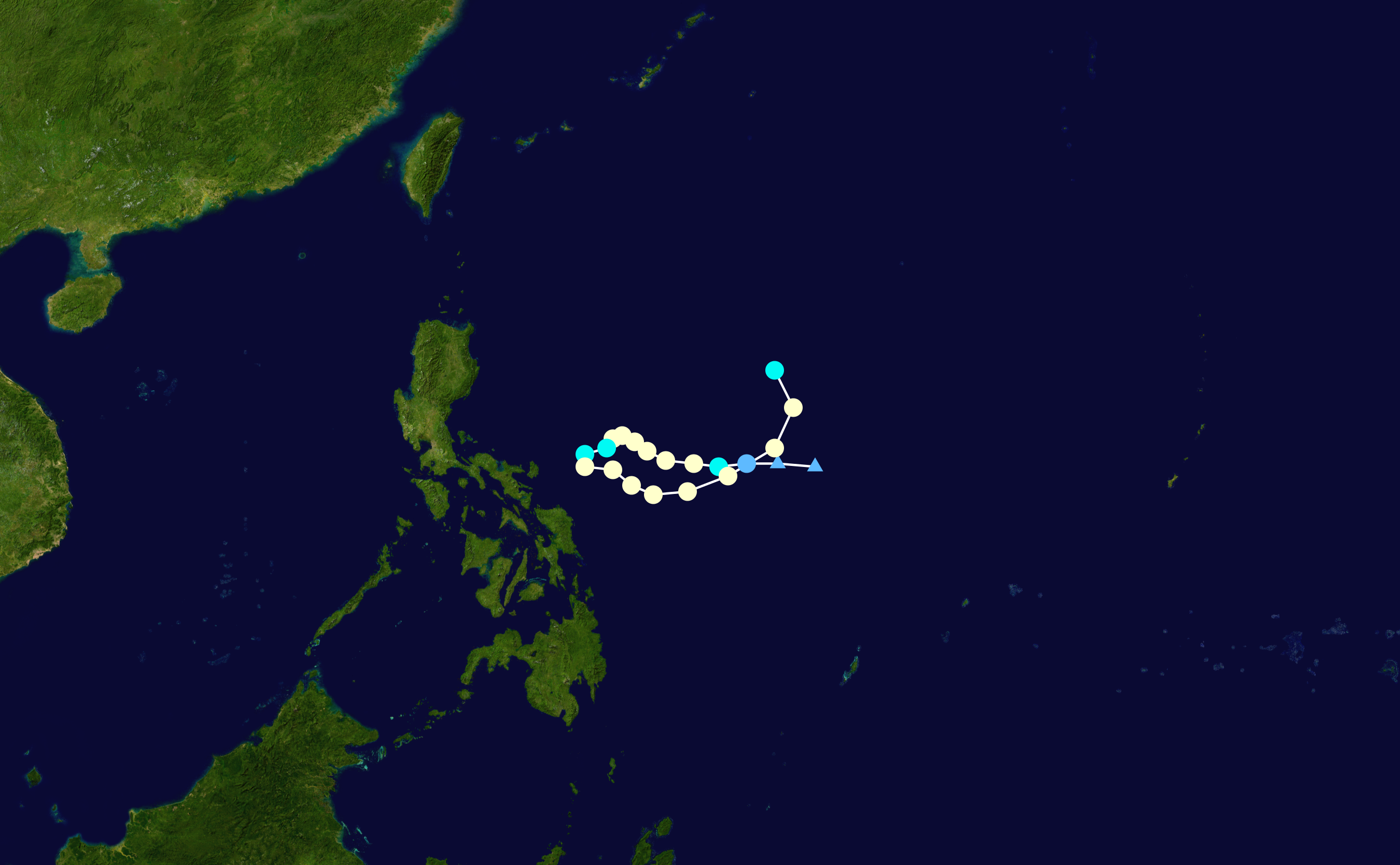
- Duration: July 27 – August 1
- Peak intensity: 150 km/h (90 mph) (1-min); 978 hPa (mbar)

Ivy did a loop and only survived 5 days before dissipating. Although Ivy did not make landfall in the Philippines it caused some damages.

=== Tropical Storm Kim ===
- Severe tropical storm (JMA)
- Tropical storm (SSHWS)
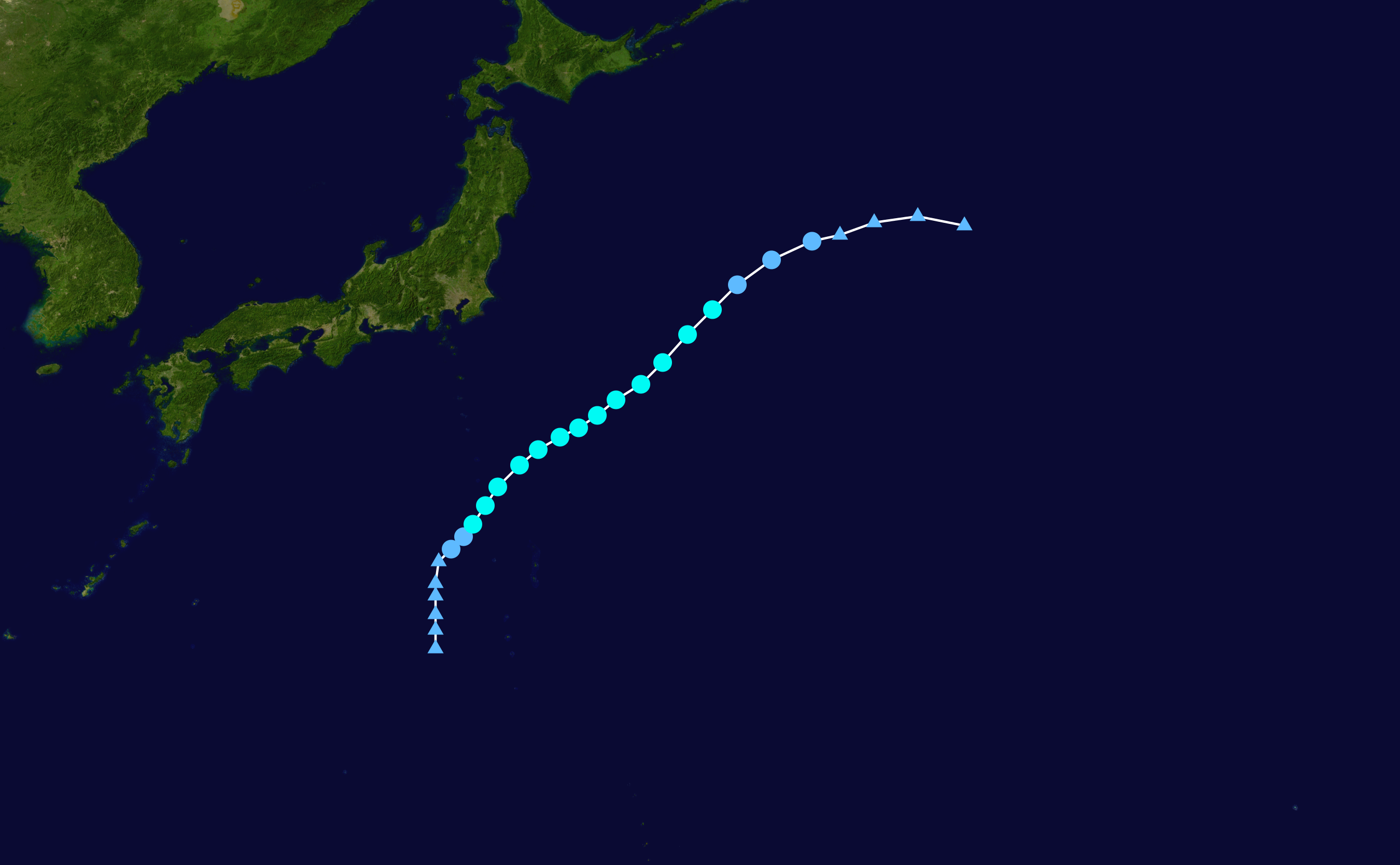
- Duration: August 2 – August 8
- Peak intensity: 110 km/h (70 mph) (1-min); 990 hPa (mbar)

Kim stayed at sea.

=== Super Typhoon Lucy ===
- Typhoon (JMA)
- Category 5 super typhoon (SSHWS)
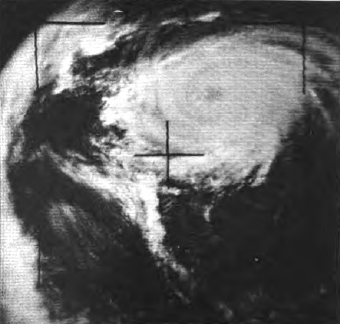
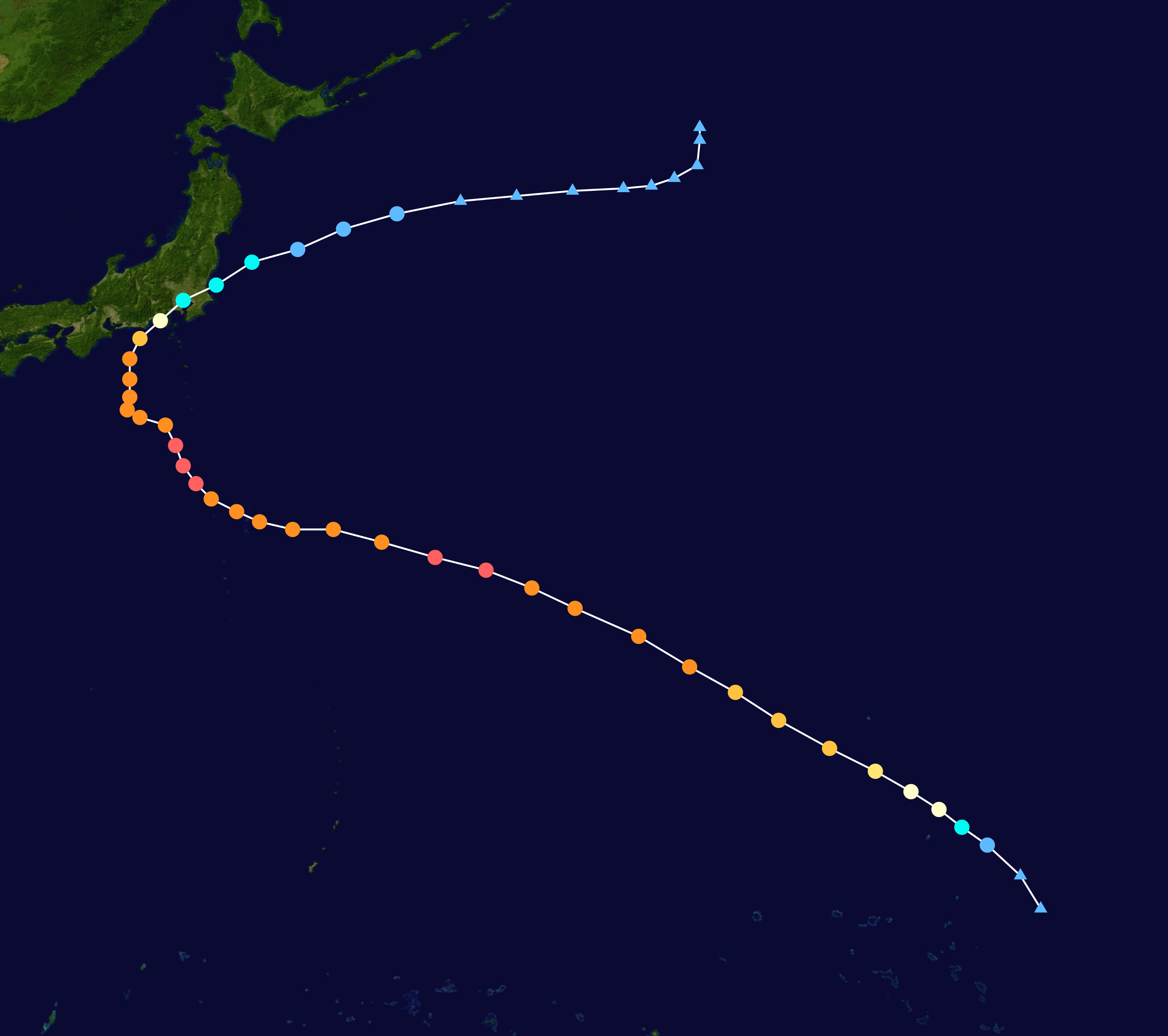
- Duration: August 14 – August 24
- Peak intensity: 295 km/h (185 mph) (1-min); 900 hPa (mbar)

On August 14 a tropical depression formed and was named Lucy after it became a tropical storm. Lucy became a typhoon and soon into a 185 mph super typhoon. Lucy weakened and struck Japan as a minimal typhoon. Lucy dissipated on August 24.

=== Super Typhoon Mary (Saling) ===
- Typhoon (JMA)
- Category 5 super typhoon (SSHWS)
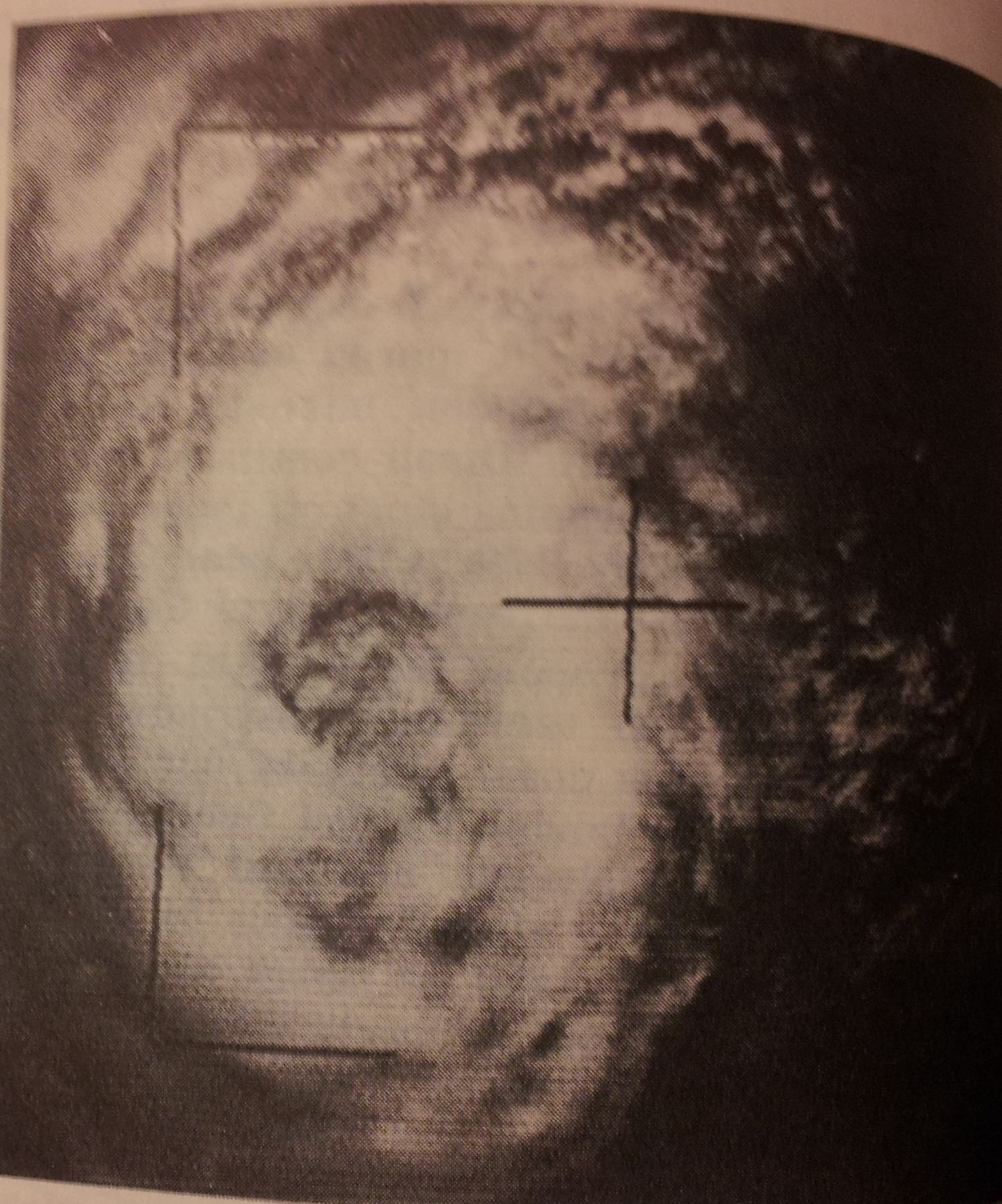
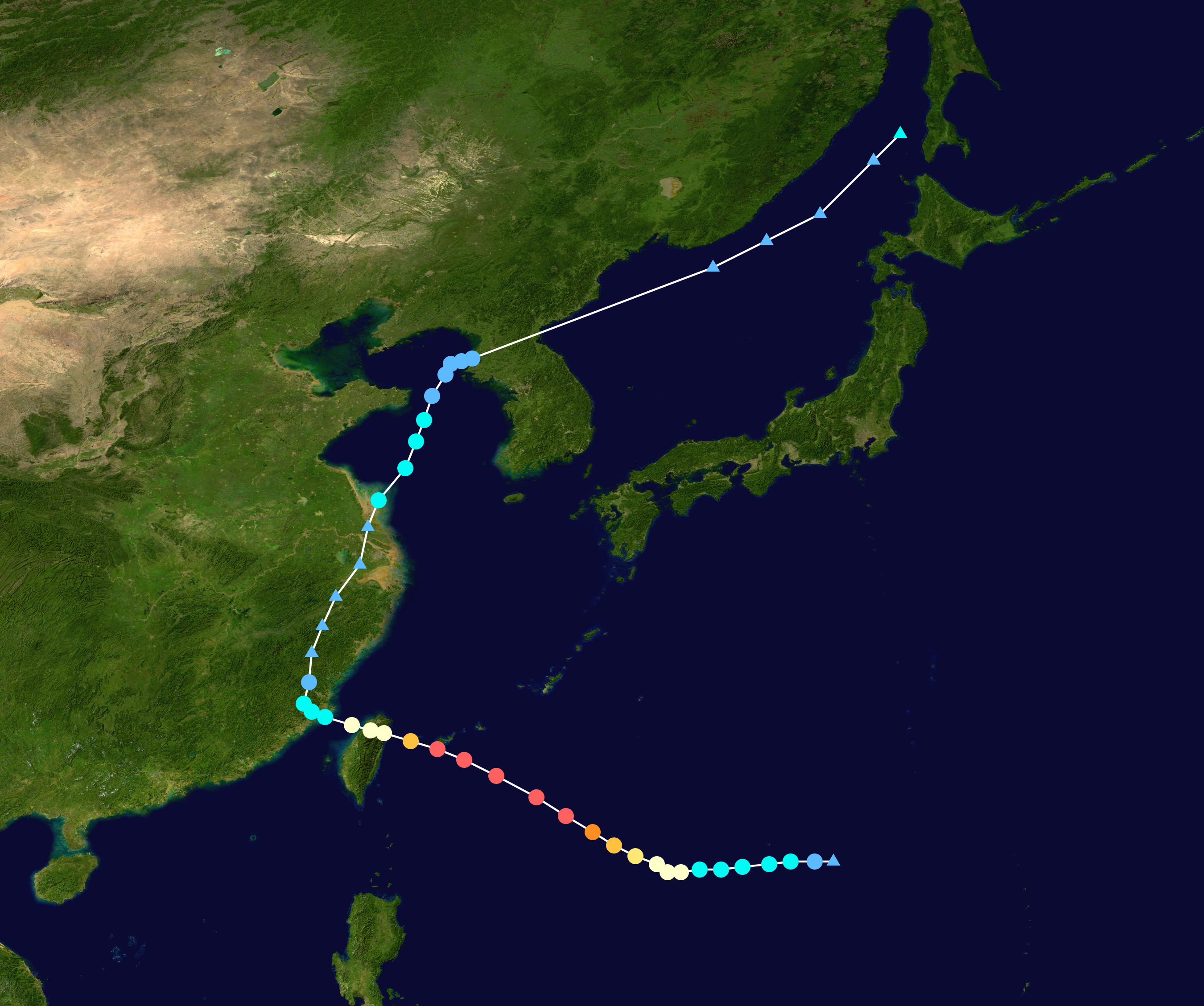
- Duration: August 14 – August 23
- Peak intensity: 285 km/h (180 mph) (1-min); 929 hPa (mbar)

175 mph Super Typhoon Mary weakened from its peak to hit eastern Taiwan on August 18 as a 105 mph typhoon. The typhoon brought strong winds and heavy rain before dissipating over China on the 20th.

=== Tropical Storm Nadine ===
- Tropical storm (JMA)
- Tropical storm (SSHWS)
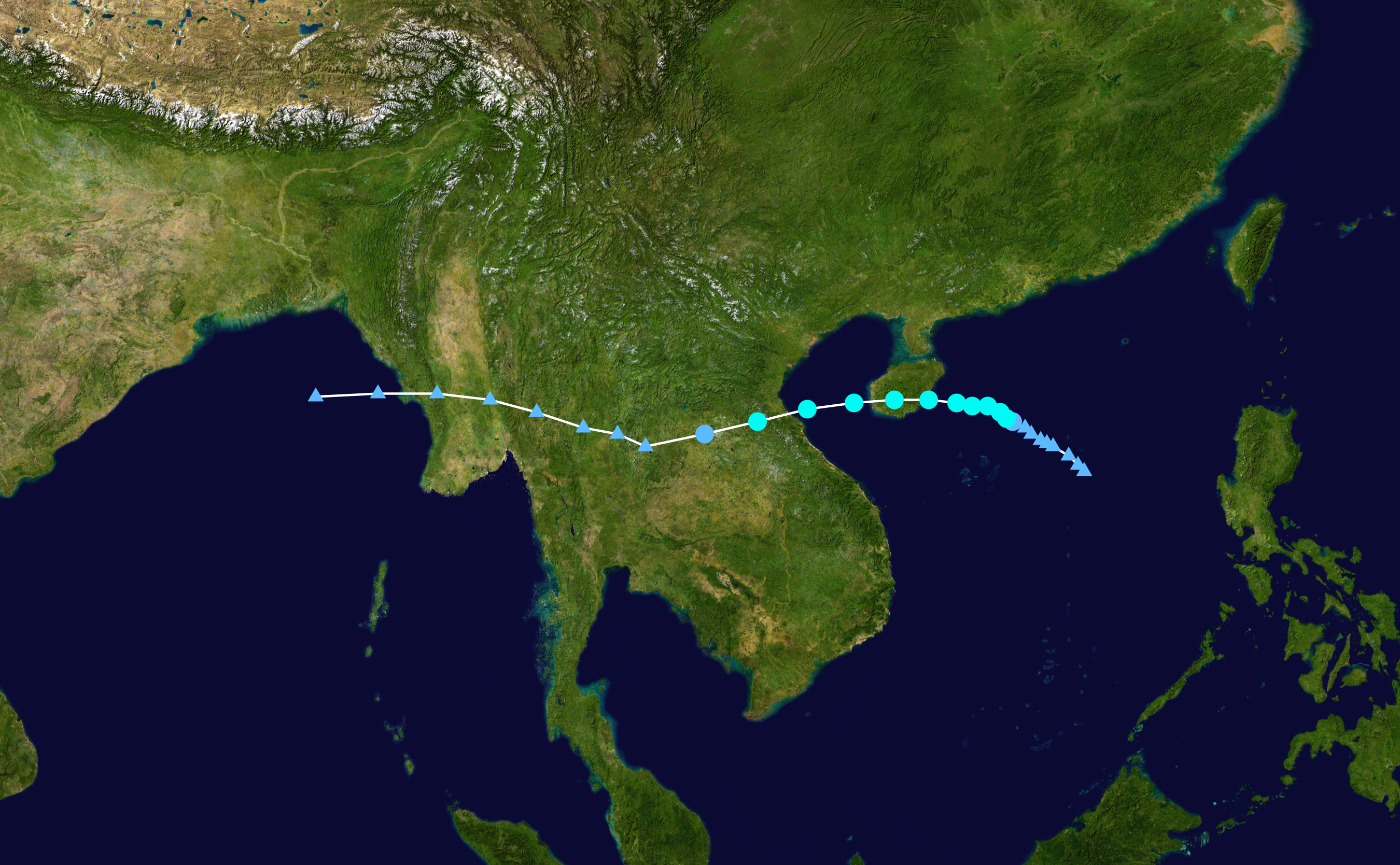
- Duration: August 14 – August 19
- Peak intensity: 110 km/h (70 mph) (1-min); 990 hPa (mbar)

=== Super Typhoon Olive ===
- Typhoon (JMA)
- Category 5 super typhoon (SSHWS)
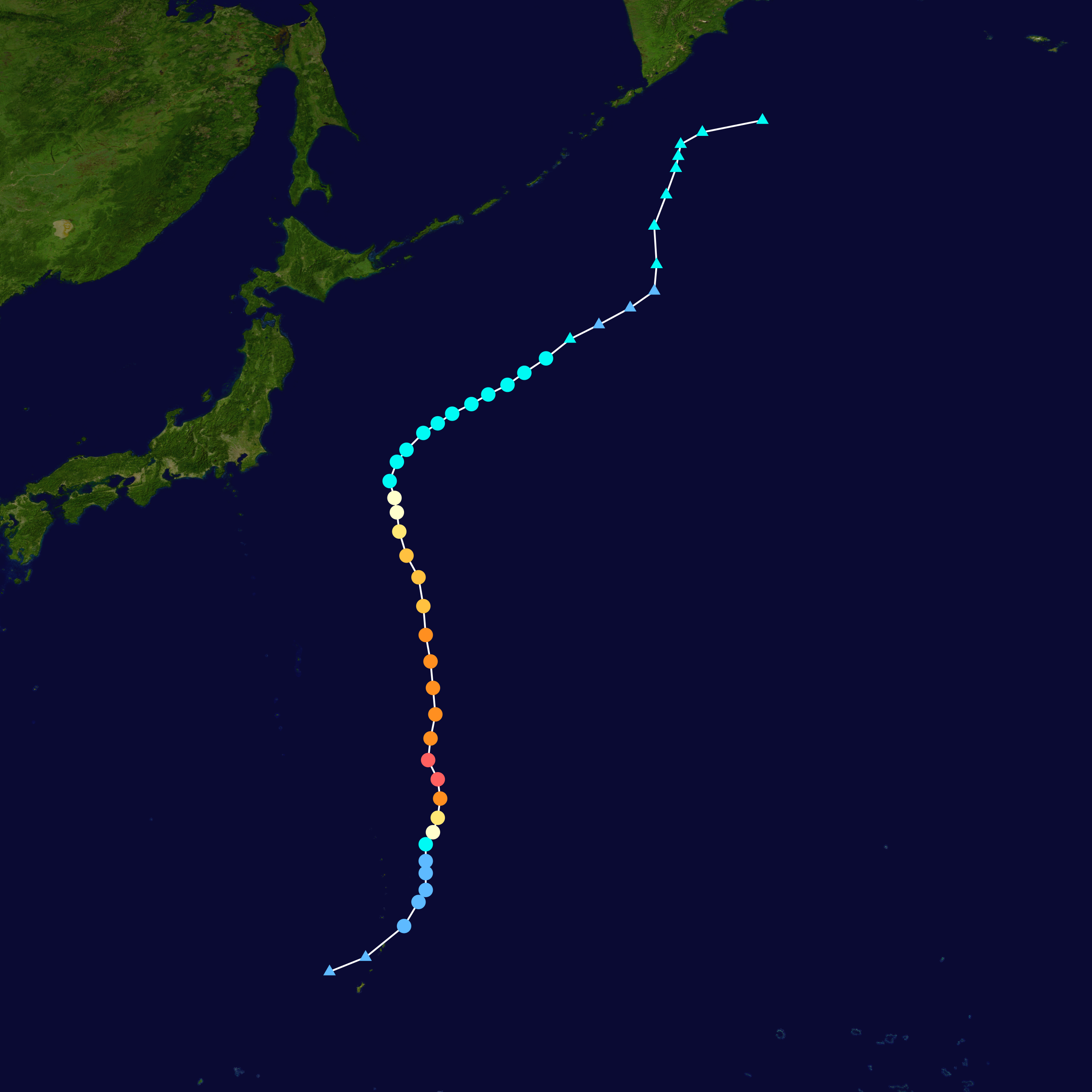
- Duration: August 26 – September 3
- Peak intensity: 280 km/h (175 mph) (1-min); 930 hPa (mbar)

Super typhoon Olive did not make landfall in land.

=== Tropical Storm Polly (Tasing) ===
- Tropical storm (JMA)
- Tropical storm (SSHWS)
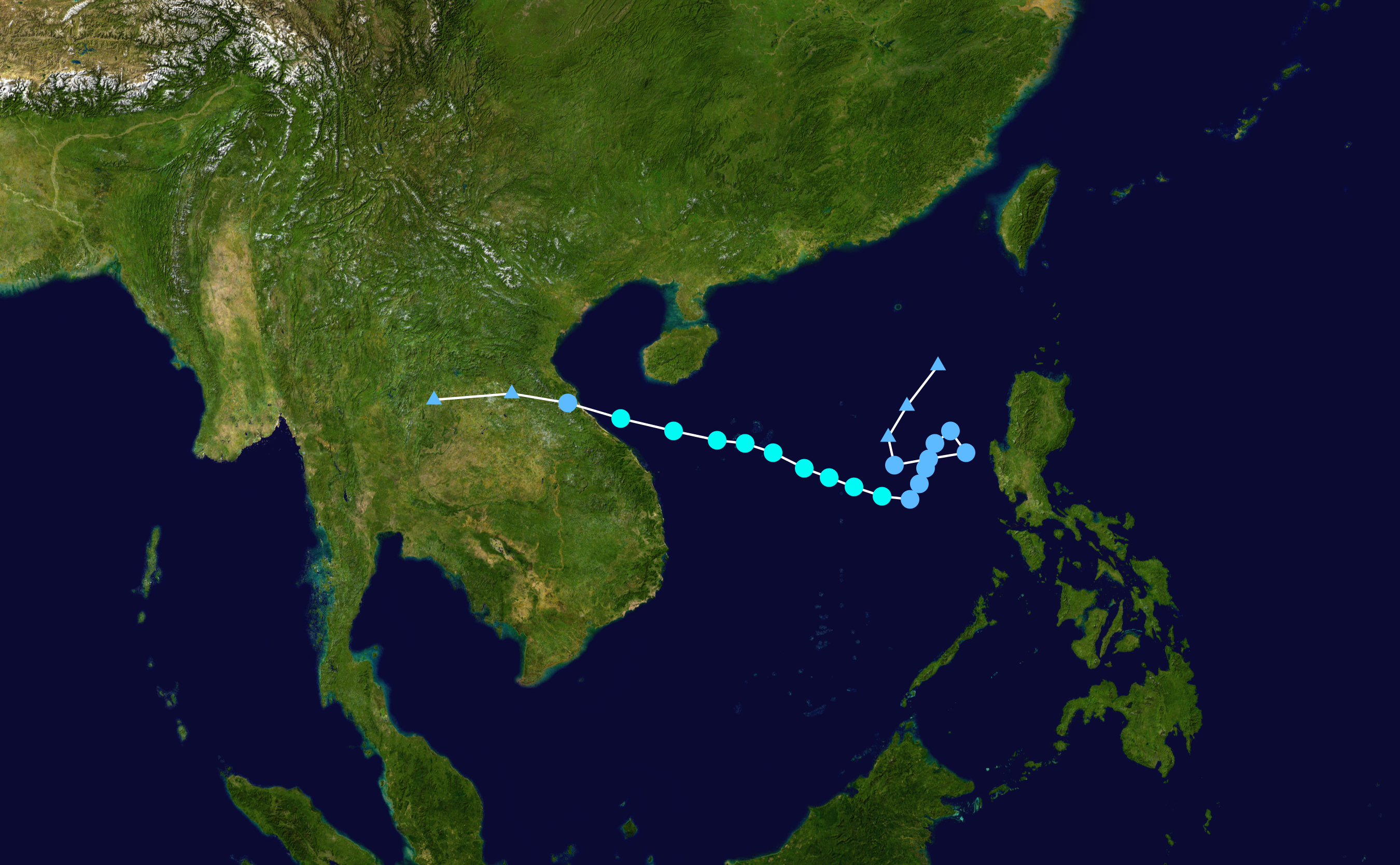
- Duration: August 30 – September 2
- Peak intensity: 85 km/h (50 mph) (1-min); 994 hPa (mbar)

=== Typhoon Rose (Unding) ===
- Typhoon (JMA)
- Category 3 typhoon (SSHWS)
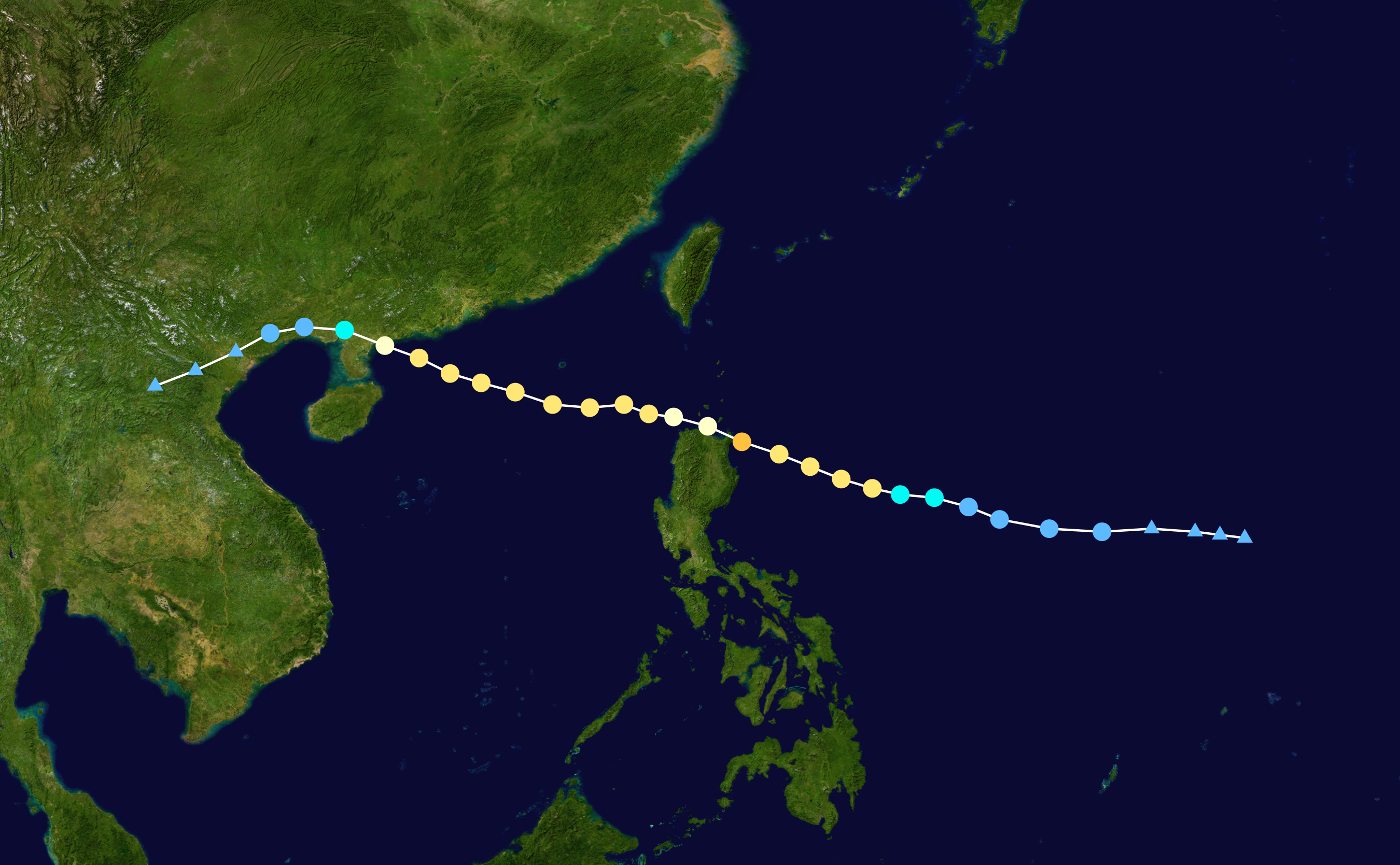
- Duration: August 30 – September 6
- Peak intensity: 185 km/h (115 mph) (1-min); 980 hPa (mbar)

Rose make landfall in the Philippines as Category 3.

=== Super Typhoon Shirley ===
- Typhoon (JMA)
- Category 4 super typhoon (SSHWS)
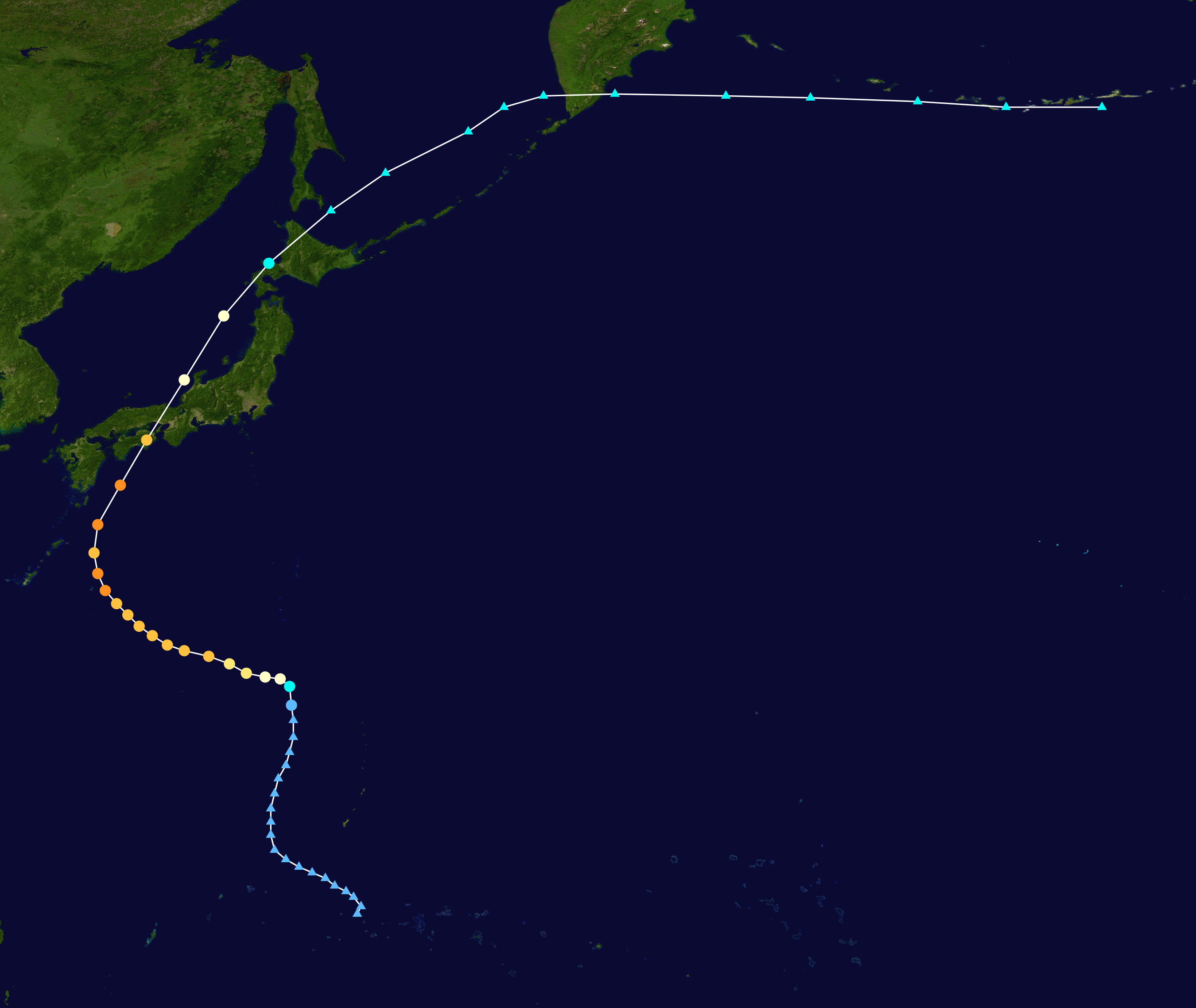
- Duration: August 31 – September 10
- Peak intensity: 240 km/h (150 mph) (1-min); 940 hPa (mbar)

130 mph Typhoon Shirley, after weakening from a peak of 150 mph, hit southern Japan on September 10, causing moderate damage and heavy rain. Resulting floods and landslides killed 67 people and left 6 missing.

=== Super Typhoon Trix (Walding) ===
- Typhoon (JMA)
- Category 4 super typhoon (SSHWS)
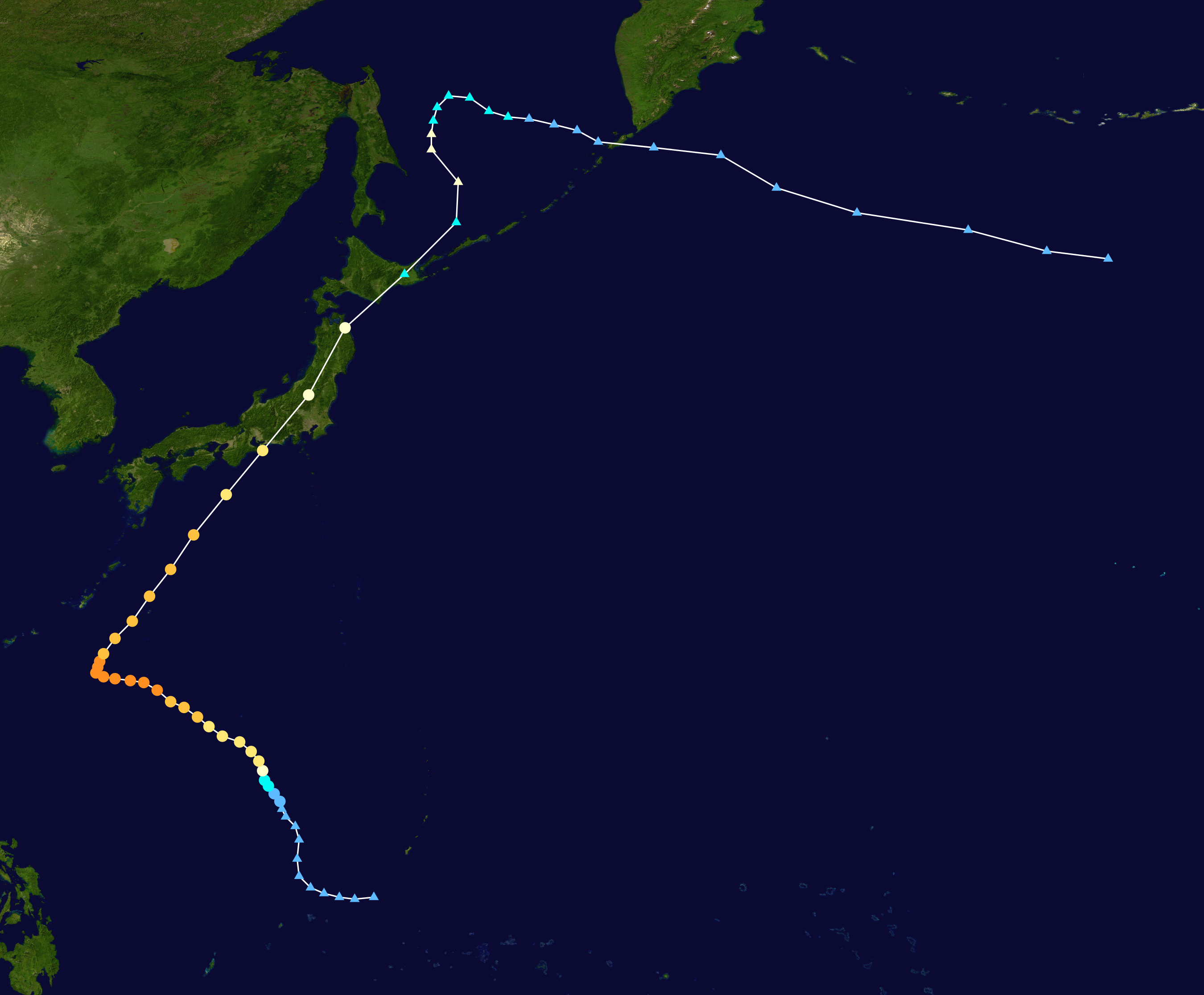
- Duration: September 7 – September 18
- Peak intensity: 240 km/h (150 mph) (1-min); 935 hPa (mbar)

Typhoon Trix struck central Honshū Island in Japan just days after Typhoon Shirley. Trix caused heavy rains. 98 people were killed and 9 were missing due to the resulting flooding and landslides.

=== Typhoon Virginia ===
- Severe tropical storm (JMA)
- Category 1 typhoon (SSHWS)
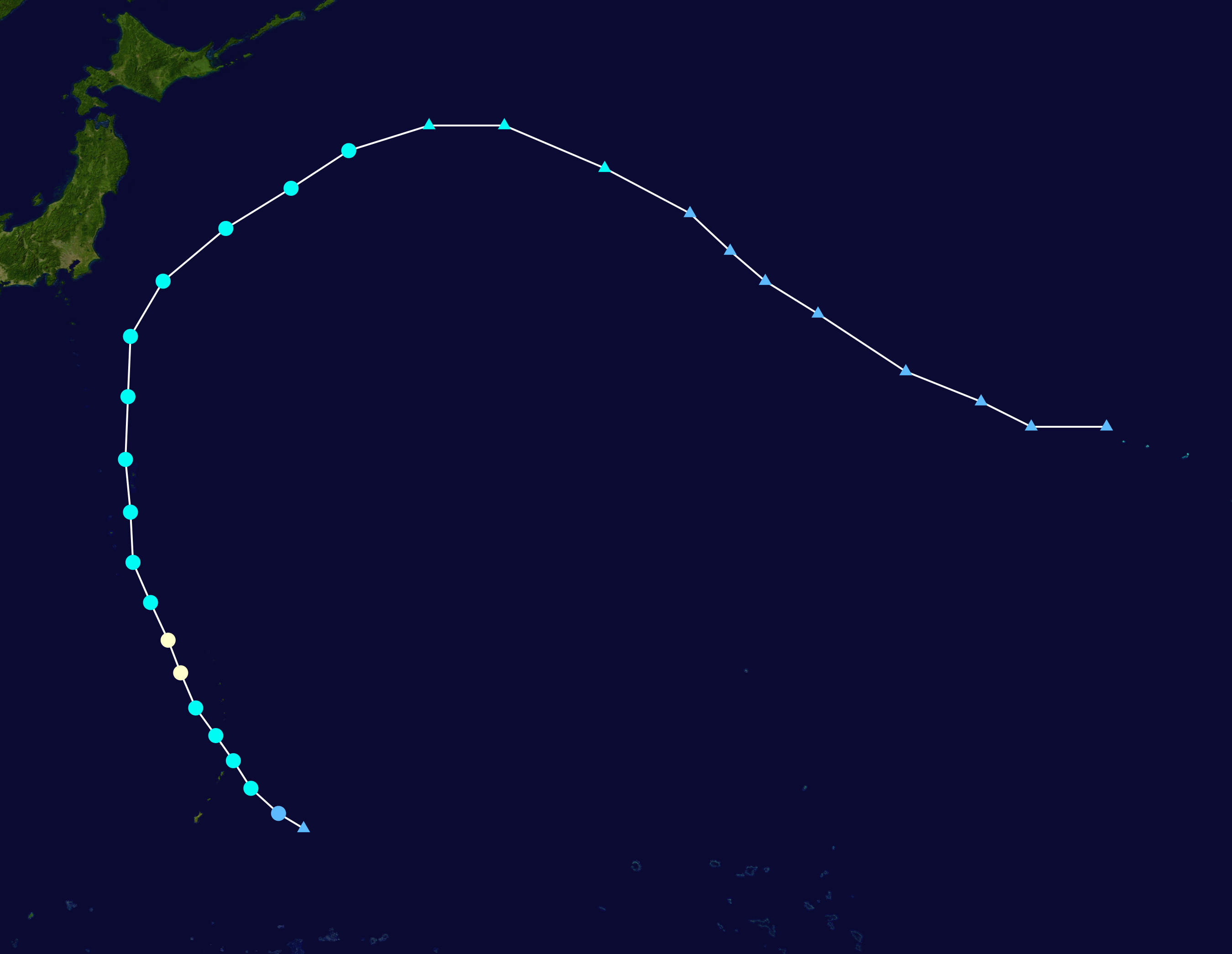
- Duration: September 12 – September 17
- Peak intensity: 120 km/h (75 mph) (1-min); 980 hPa (mbar)

Virginia stayed in the sea.

=== Tropical Storm Wendy (Yeyeng) ===
- Severe tropical storm (JMA)
- Tropical storm (SSHWS)
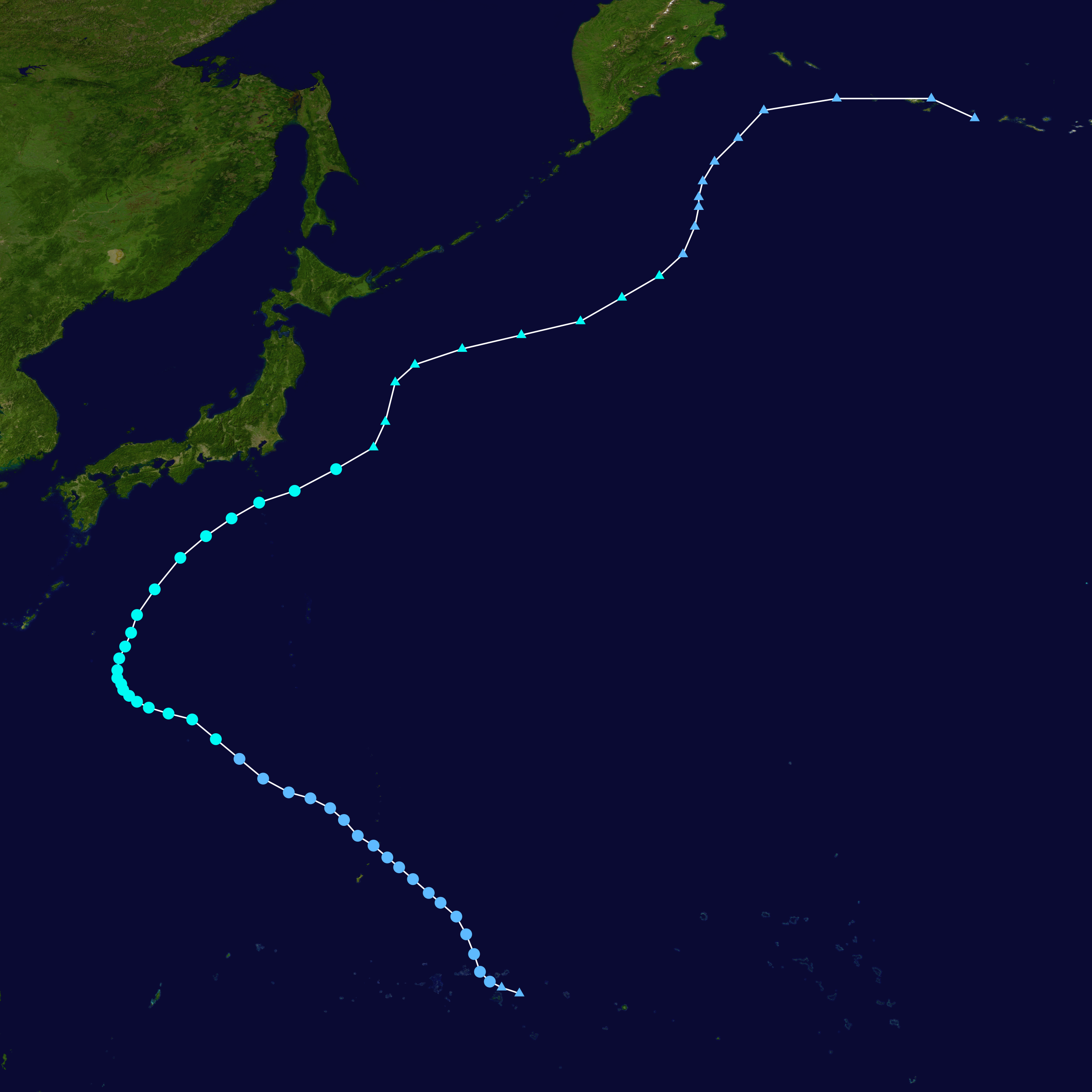
- Duration: September 15 – September 25
- Peak intensity: 95 km/h (60 mph) (1-min); 986 hPa (mbar)

=== Tropical Storm Agnes ===
- Tropical storm (JMA)
- Tropical storm (SSHWS)
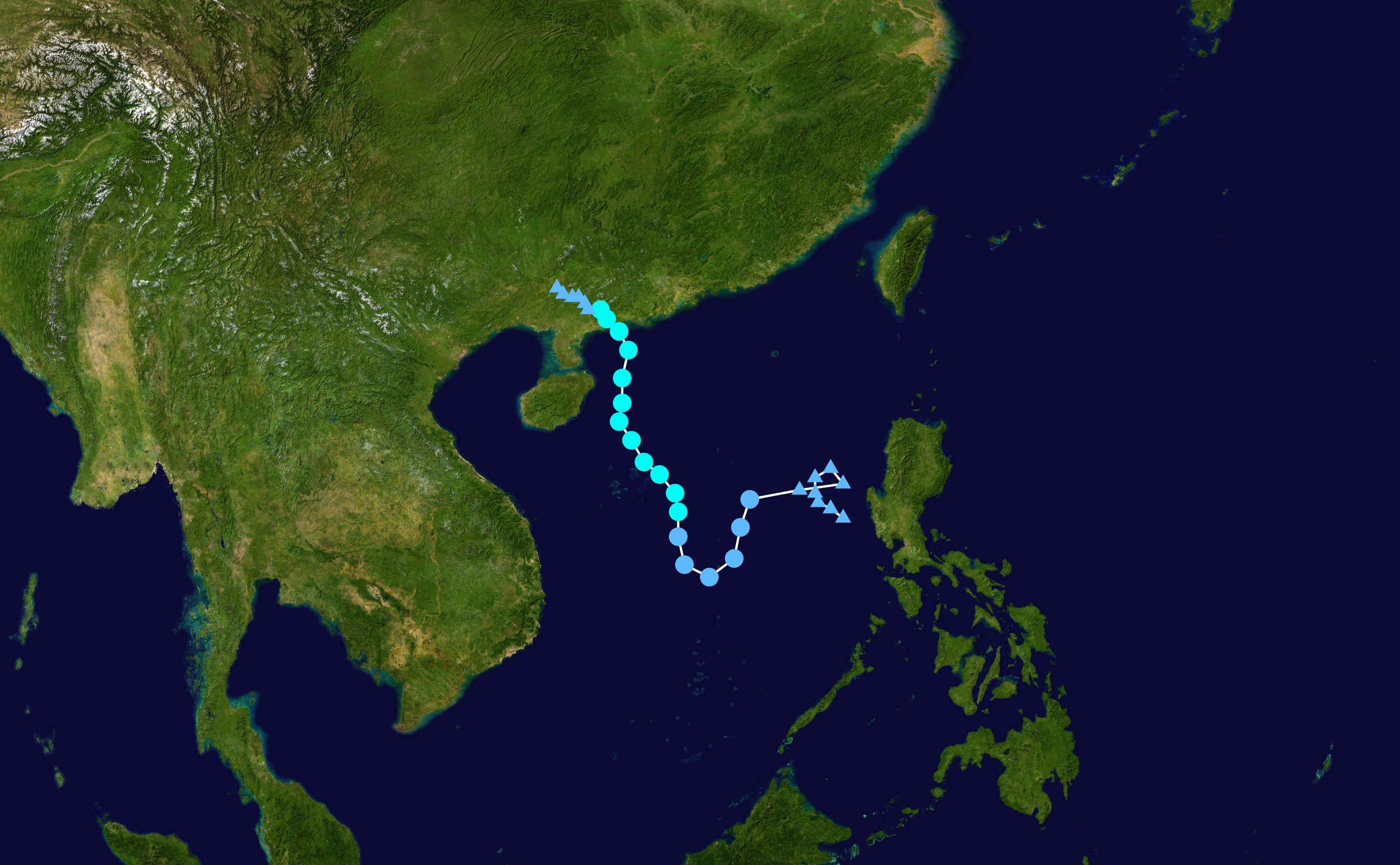
- Duration: September 23 – September 29
- Peak intensity: 110 km/h (70 mph) (1-min); 990 hPa (mbar)

Tropical Storm Agnes struck Hong Kong killing 5 people.

=== Super Typhoon Bess ===
- Typhoon (JMA)
- Category 5 super typhoon (SSHWS)
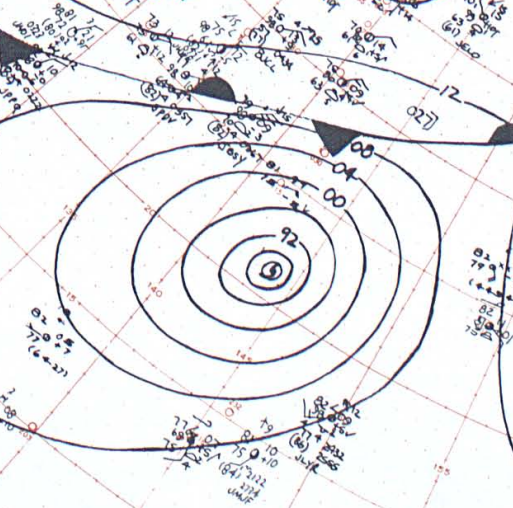
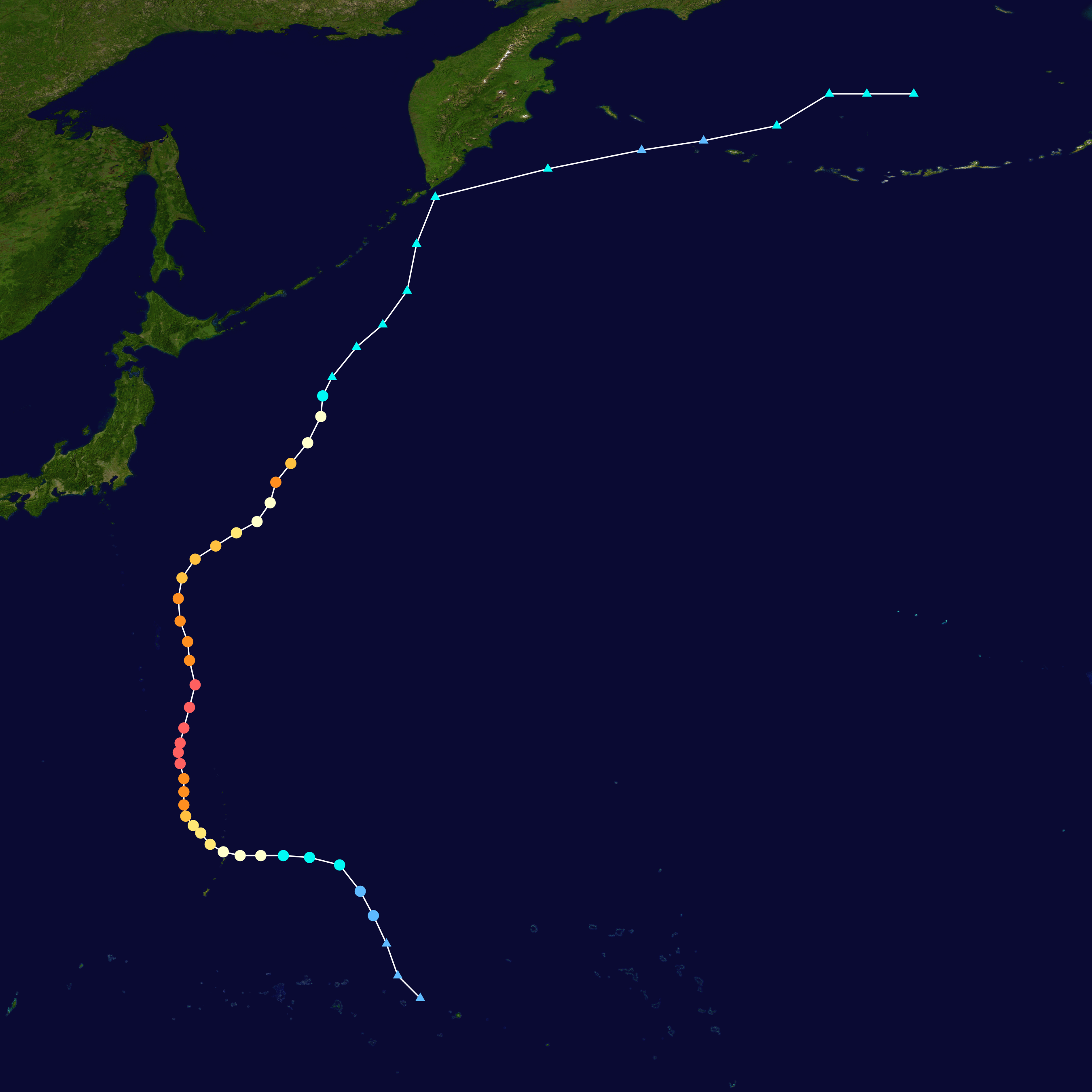
- Duration: September 25 – October 5
- Peak intensity: 295 km/h (185 mph) (1-min); 900 hPa (mbar)

Bess formed on the 25 September northeast of Pohnpei, Micronesia where it would track east for 18 hours. The next day, the storm would officially be recognized as a tropical depression on the Saffir-Simpson scale whilst moving northwest. Twelve hours later at 6pm, the depression would be upgraded to a tropical storm with barometric pressure of 998 hPa and would be assigned the name Bess by the JTWC.

Once becoming a tropical storm, Bess would start drifting to the east. The storm would reach hurricane-force winds on the 27 September with winds of 120 km/h (75 mph) and would be recognized as a typhoon by the Japan Meteorological Agency (JMA). Bess reached Category 2 winds the next morning at 6am whilst gradually turning to the north. Bess would intensify and hit Category 4 winds exactly a day later on the 29th. Typhoon Bess would hit its peak intensity on the 30th September with 1-minute sustained winds of 295 km/h and barometric pressure of 900 hPa, sustaining it for 36 hours.

On the 1st October, the storm would weaken back into a Category 4 super typhoon and would begin weakening. Bess would become a Category 3 typhoon the next day on the 2nd; starting to move northeast. Another 18 hours later on the next day, the storm would begin rapidly weakening; becoming a Category 1 typhoon just 12 hours later. Unexpectedly on the 4th October, Bess would experience an extreme case of rapid intensification, jumping from winds of 150 to 205 km/h in just 6 hours. This intensity would be short lived as Bess weakened back to a Category 1 typhoon just 12 hours later.

Exactly 18 hours after Bess reached Category 4 intensity, the storm had dropped to winds of 110 km/h; a tropical storm on the Saffir-Simpson scale. Whilst moving to the northeast, the storm continued to weaken, briefly becoming a tropical depression on the 6th October and becoming an extratropical cyclone that same day. The now extratropical cyclone drifted east, passing Russia and then dissipated on the 8th October nearby Alaska.

=== Late September depression ===
- Tropical depression (SSHWS)
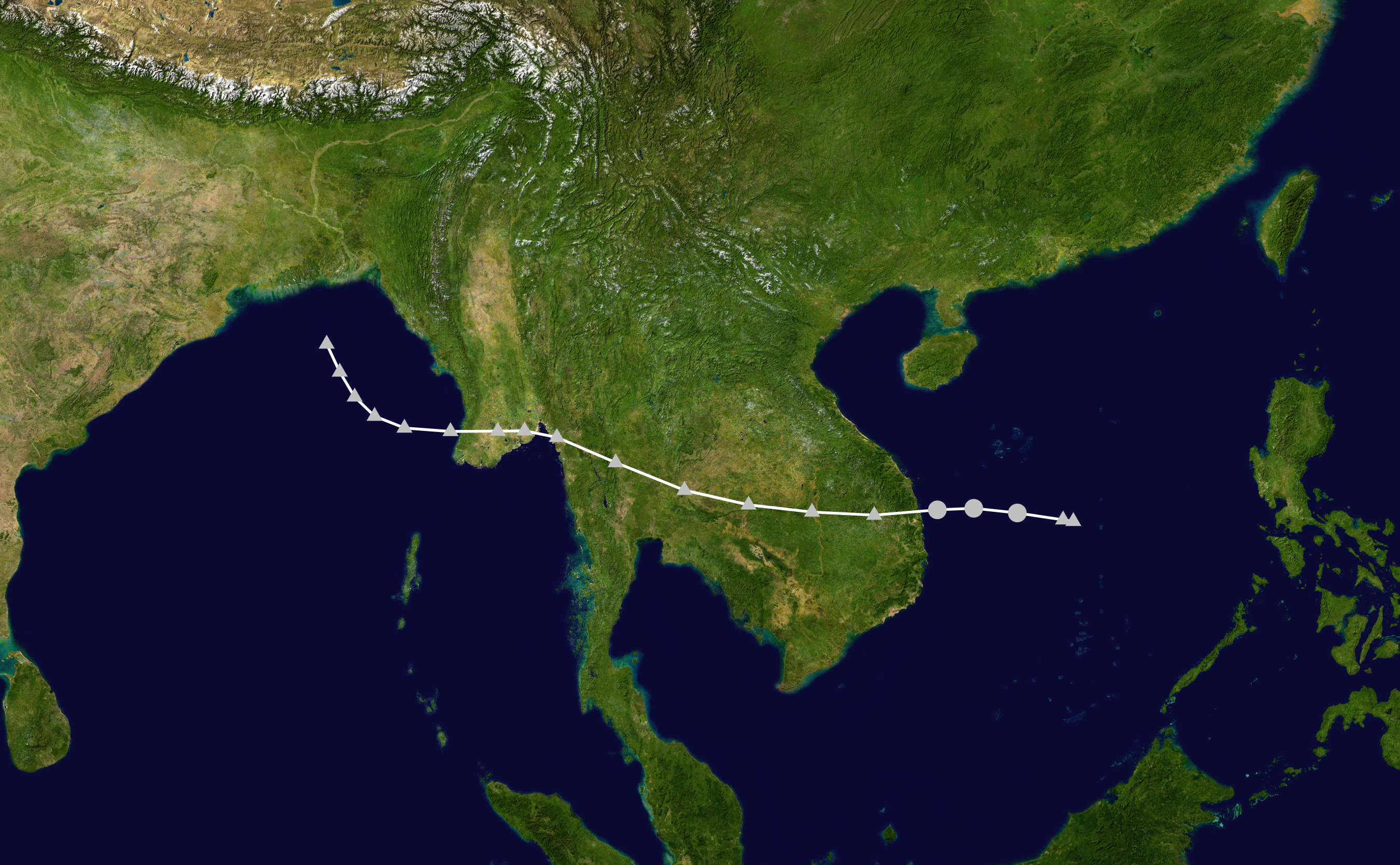
- Duration: September 25 – September 26

=== Super Typhoon Carmen ===
- Typhoon (JMA)
- Category 5 super typhoon (SSHWS)
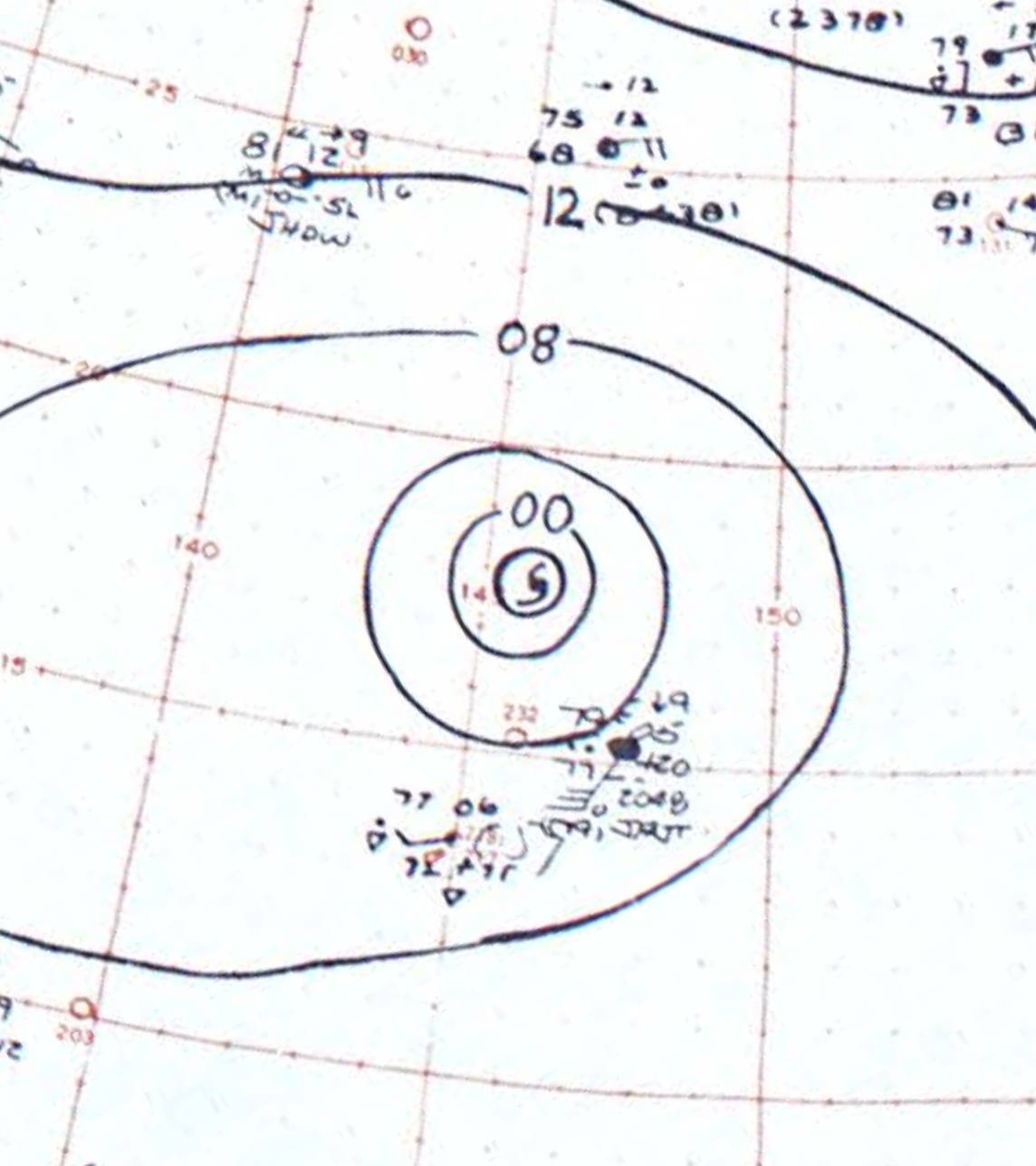
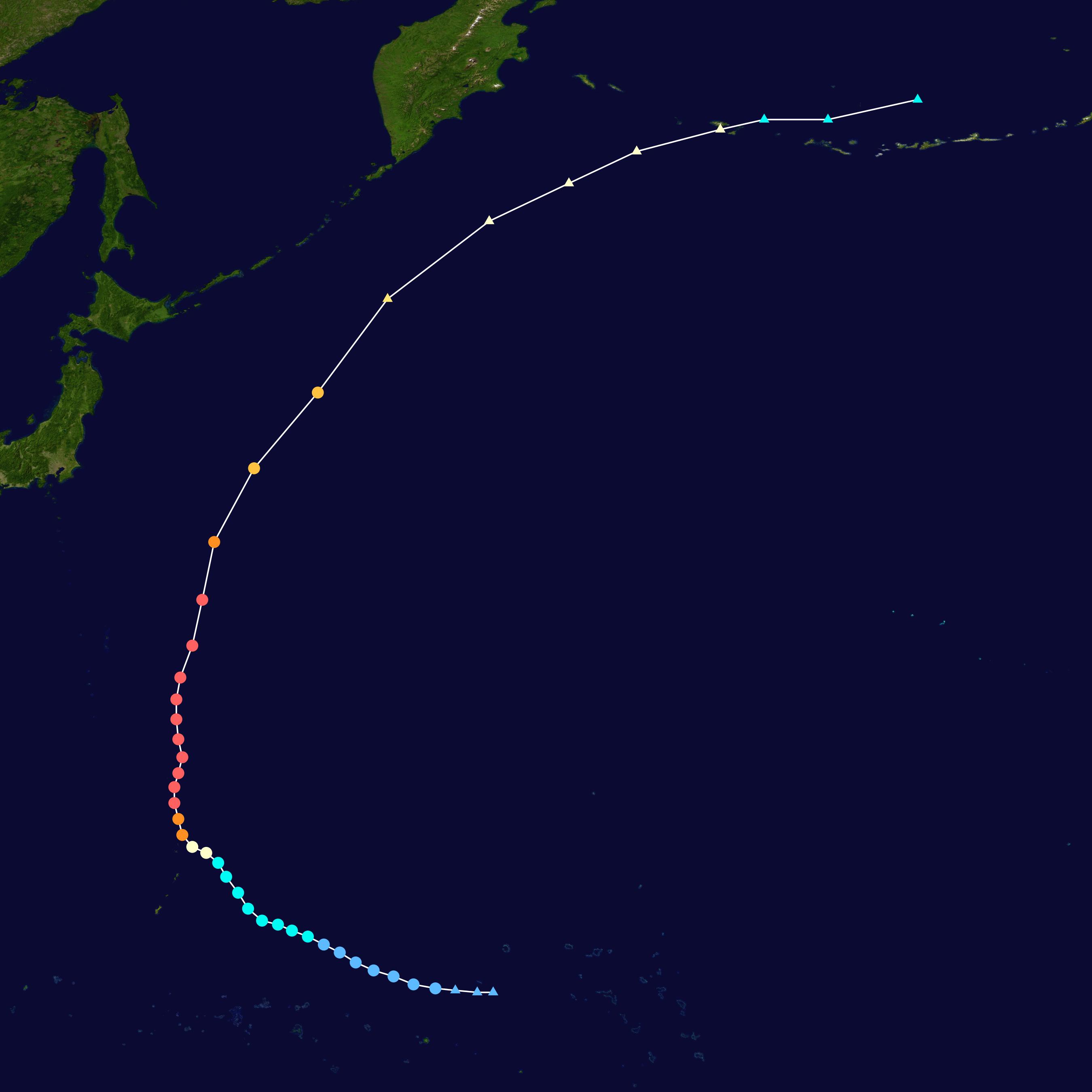
- Duration: October 1 – October 9
- Peak intensity: 285 km/h (180 mph) (1-min); 905 hPa (mbar)

Typhoon Carmen formed from a vortex developing on September 30, 1965, becoming a tropical depression on October 1 near Eniwetok Atoll. It intensified into a tropical storm on October 3 and a typhoon by October 5. Carmen rapidly strengthened, peaking as a Category 5 equivalent super typhoon with winds of 285 km/h (170 mph) and a central pressure of 905 hPa on October 6. Its eye passed over Pagan in the Mariana Islands that day, causing catastrophic damage on Agrihan where all structures and crops were destroyed, forcing permanent evacuation. Carmen maintained peak intensity until October 9, when cold air intrusion began weakening it east of Tokyo. It accelerated northeastward, transitioning to an extratropical cyclone. Carmen weakened further, passing over the Aleutian Islands on October 11 and entering the Gulf of Alaska before dissipating near southeastern Alaska on October 15. The typhoon caused severe impacts, particularly in the Northern Marianas. Before landfall, B-52s evacuated Guam. Agrihan was devastated. A major maritime disaster occurred when Carmen's center passed near Agrihan: seven fishing boats capsized attempting to flee, resulting in 1,290 tons lost, 208 people missing, and only 1 confirmed survivor (with 39 others rescued ashore). Relief efforts, including rebuilding Pagan's airstrip, were initiated.

=== Tropical Depression Anding ===
- Tropical depression (PAGASA)
- Duration: October 5 – October 7
- Peak intensity: 55 km/h (35 mph) (10-min);

Anding did not last long. This is the only Tropical Depression tracked by PAGASA.

=== Typhoon Della ===
- Typhoon (JMA)
- Category 2 typhoon (SSHWS)
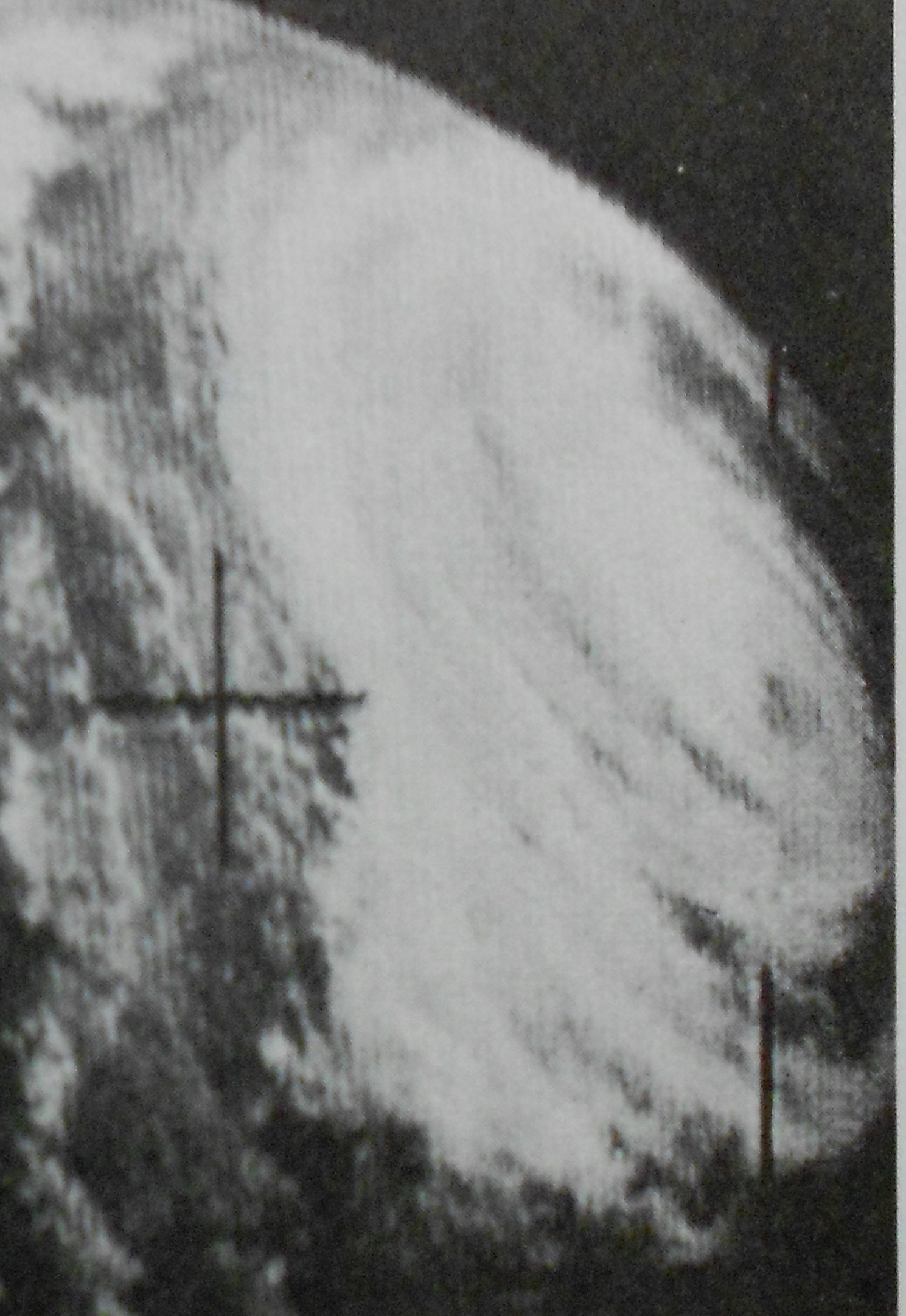
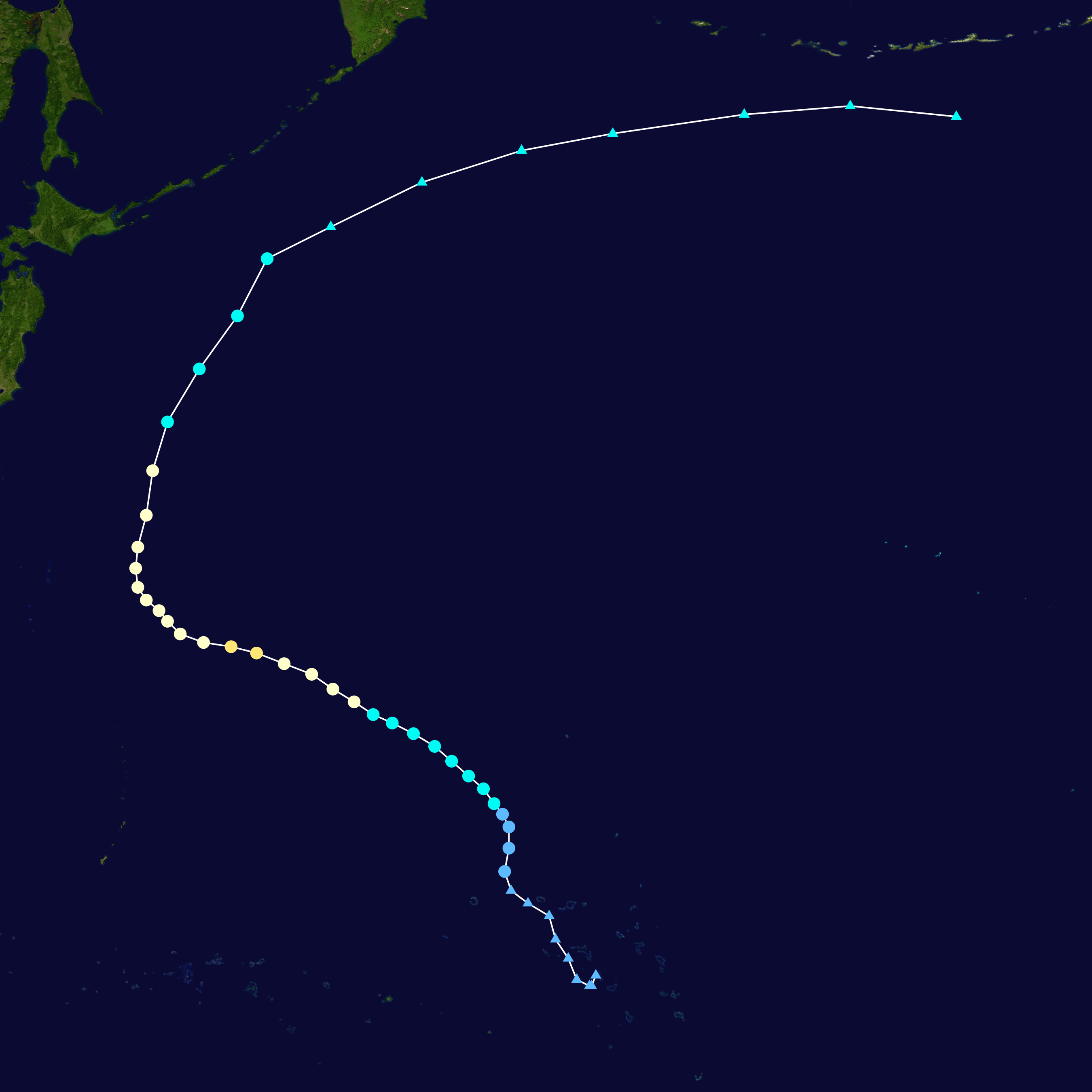
- Duration: October 10 – October 20
- Peak intensity: 155 km/h (100 mph) (1-min); 975 hPa (mbar)

Della stayed at sea.

=== Tropical Storm Elaine ===
- Tropical storm (JMA)
- Tropical storm (SSHWS)
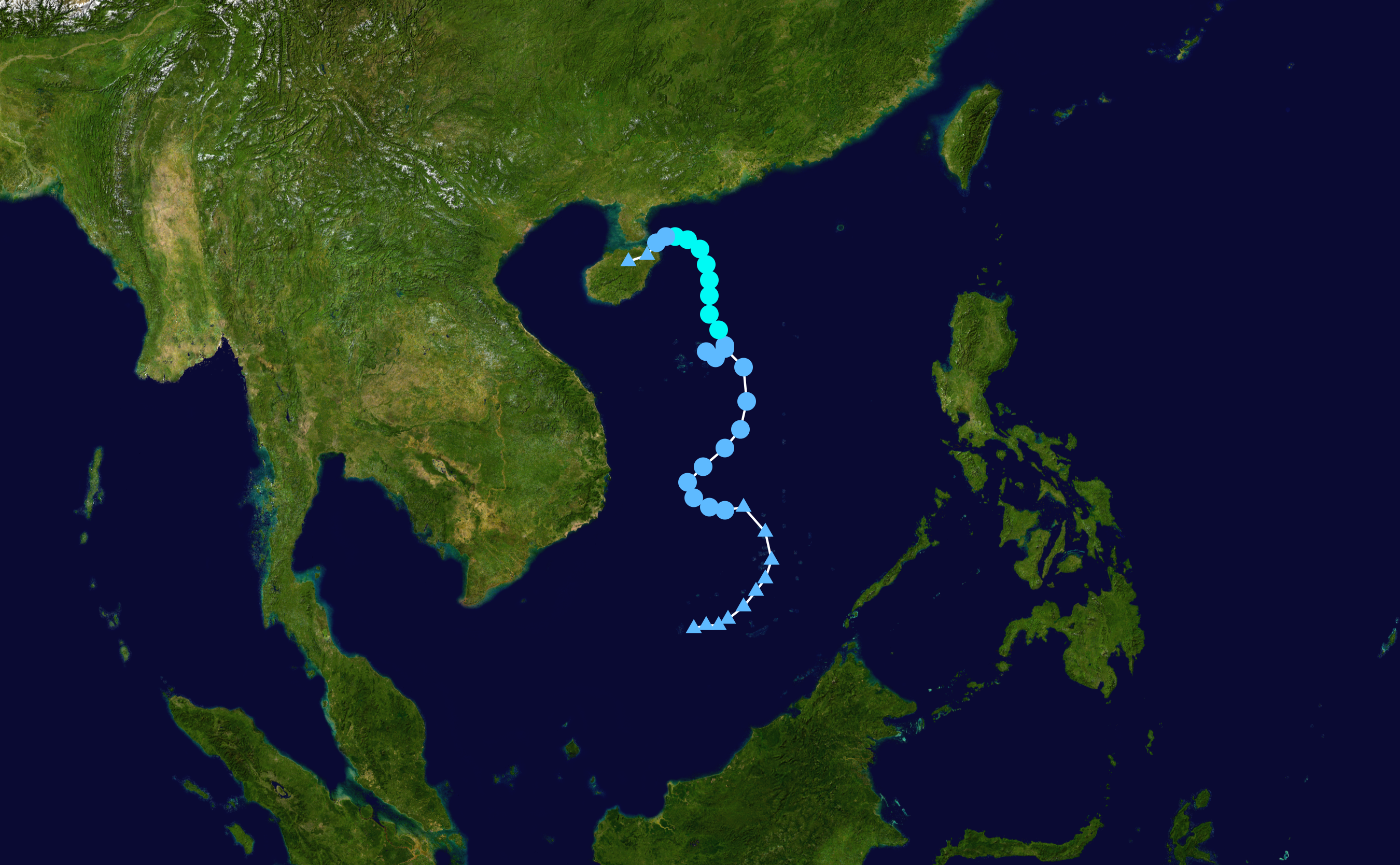
- Duration: November 5 – November 13
- Peak intensity: 95 km/h (60 mph) (1-min); 996 hPa (mbar)

=== Super Typhoon Faye (Binang) ===
- Typhoon (JMA)
- Category 5 super typhoon (SSHWS)
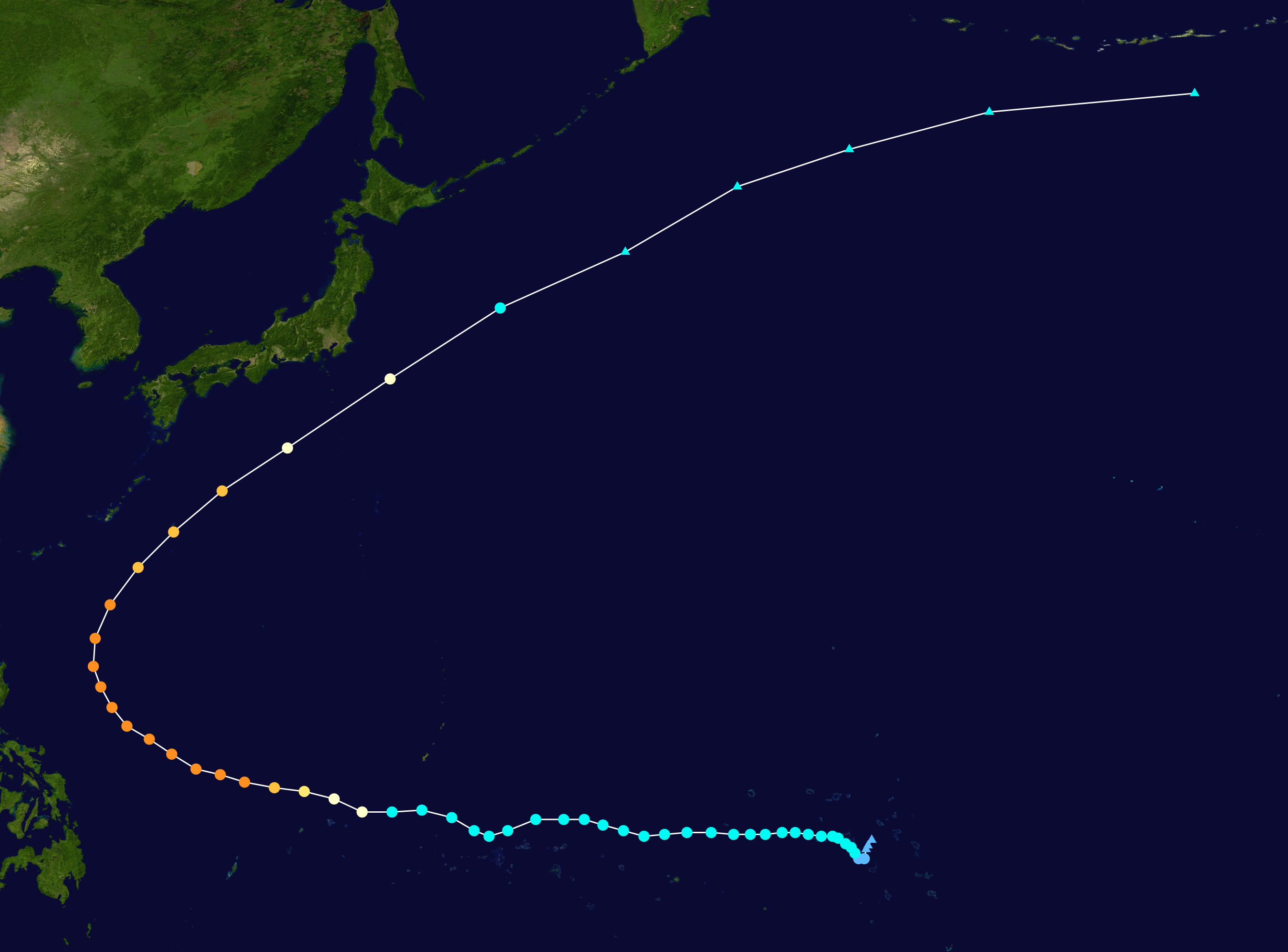
- Duration: November 13 – November 26
- Peak intensity: 270 km/h (165 mph) (1-min); 928 hPa (mbar)

Faye stayed in the sea. This system did not impact land.

=== Tropical Storm Gloria ===
- Tropical depression (JMA)
- Tropical storm (SSHWS)
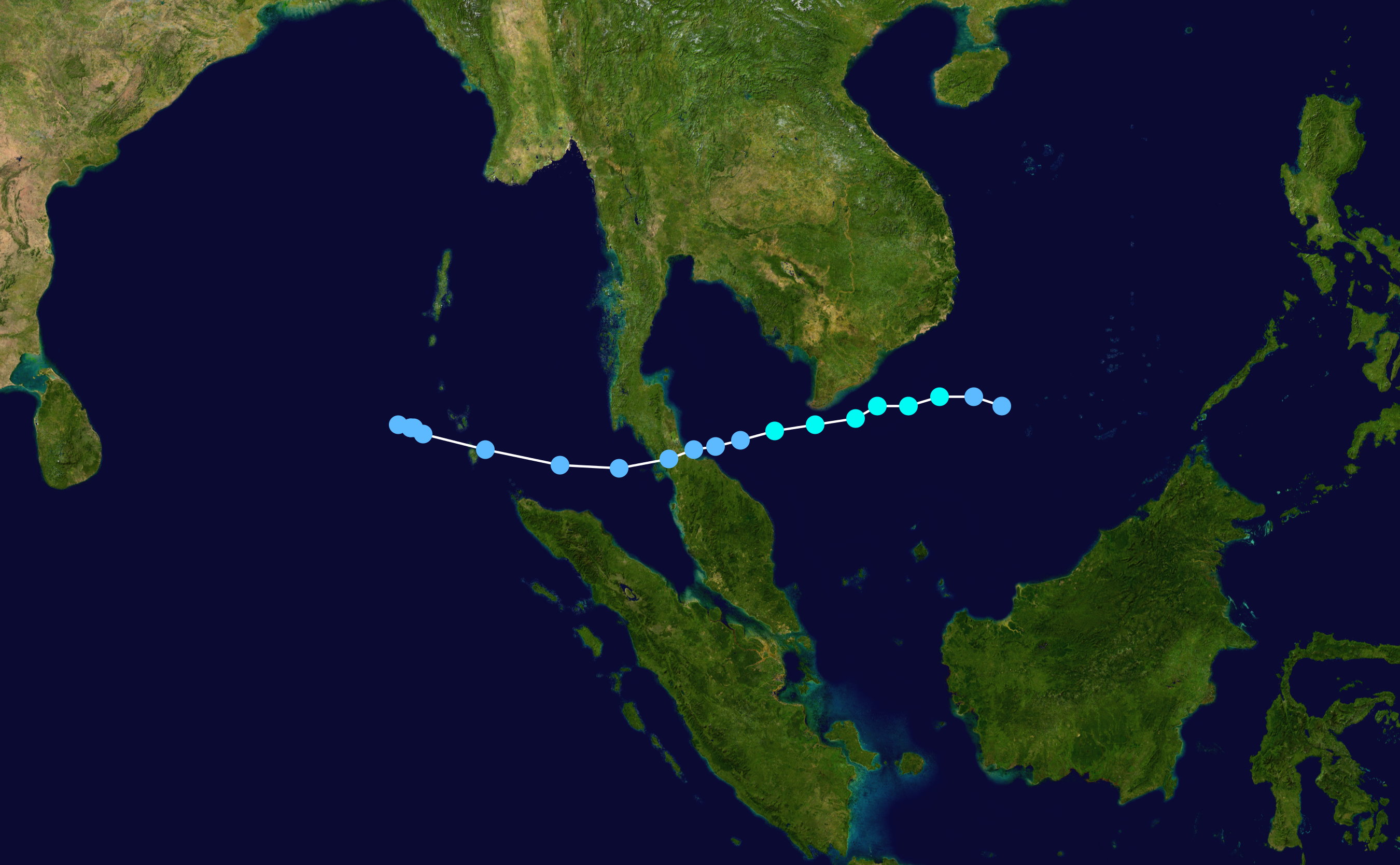
- Duration: December 18 – December 21
- Peak intensity: 75 km/h (45 mph) (1-min); 1003 hPa (mbar)

Gloria made landfall in southern Thailand as Tropical Depression. Although Gloria did not made landfall in southern Vietnam it caused some damage.

== Storm names ==
- Agnes 33W
- Bess 34W
- Carmen 35W
- Della 37W
- Elaine 38W
- Faye 39W
- Gloria 40W
- Hester
- Irma
- Judy
- Kit
- Lola
- Mamie
- Nina
- Ora
- Phyllis
- Rita
- Susan
- Tess
- Viola
- Winnie
- Alice
- Betty
- Cora
- Doris
- Elsie
- Flossie
- Grace
- Helen
- Ida
- June
- Kathy
- Lorna
- Marie
- Nancy
- Olga
- Pamela
- Ruby
- Sally
- Therese
- Violet
- Wilda
- Anita
- Billie
- Clara
- Dot
- Ellen
- Fran
- Georgia
- Hope
- Iris
- Joan
- Kate
- Louise
- Marge
- Nora
- Opal
- Patsy 1W
- Ruth 2W
- Sarah 3W
- Thelma 4W
- Vera 5W
- Wanda 6W
- Amy 7W
- Babe 9W
- Carla 10W
- Dinah 11W
- Emma 12W
- Freda 14W
- Gilda 15W
- Harriet 16W
- Ivy 18W
- Jean 17W
- Kim 19W
- Lucy 20W
- Mary 21W
- Nadine 22W
- Olive 25W
- Polly 26W
- Rose 27W
- Shirley 28W
- Trix 29W
- Virginia 31W
- Wendy 32W

=== Philippines ===
==== Used Names ====
Official List
Atring	Bining	Kuring	Daling	Elang
Goring	Huling	Ibiang	Luming	Miling
Narsing	Openg	Pining	Rubing	Saling
Tasing	Unding	Walding	Yeyeng	
Auxiliary list used
				Anding
Binang				

==== Unused names ====
Unused names
Kadiang (unused)	Dinang (unused)	Epang (unused)	Gundang (unused)

The Philippine Weather Bureau uses its own naming scheme for tropical cyclones in their area of responsibility. It assigns names to tropical depressions that form within their area of responsibility and any tropical cyclone that might move into their area of responsibility. Should the list of names for a given year prove to be insufficient, names are taken from an auxiliary list, the first 6 of which are published each year before the season starts. Names not retired from this list will be used again in the 1969 season. PWB (and its eventual successor, PAGASA) uses its own naming scheme that starts in the Filipino alphabet, with names of Filipino female names ending with "ng" (A, B, K, D, etc.). Names that were not assigned/going to use are marked in gray.

== See also ==
- 1965 Atlantic hurricane season
- Australian cyclone seasons: 1964–65, 1965–66
- South Pacific cyclone seasons: 1964–65, 1965–66
- South-West Indian Ocean cyclone seasons: 1964–65, 1965–66
