= 1993 hurricane season =

1993 hurricane season may refer to:

- The 1993 Atlantic hurricane season
- The 1993 Pacific hurricane season
