= 1993 North Indian Ocean cyclone season =

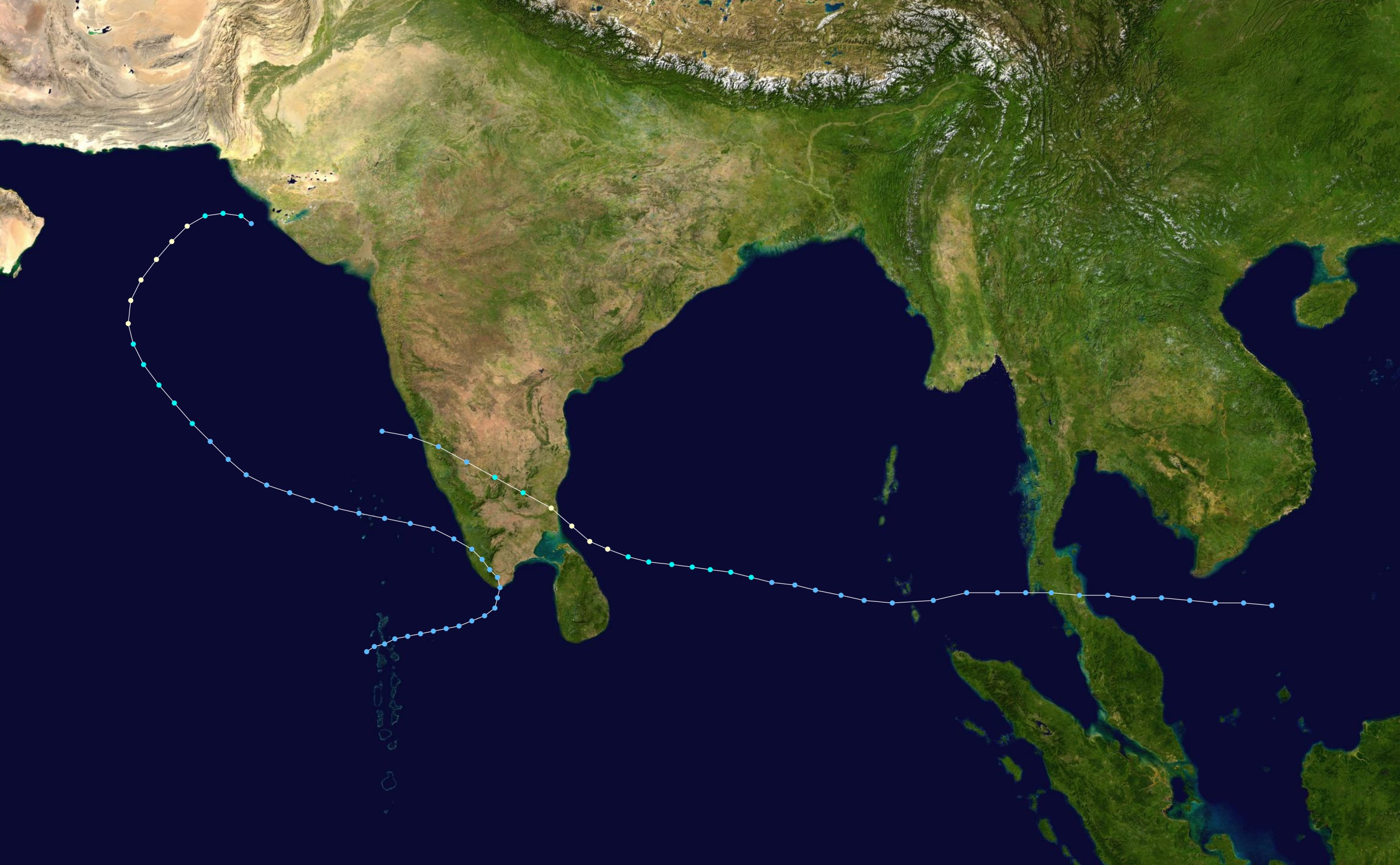
- Season summary map

Seasonal boundaries
- First system formed: June 17, 1993
- Last system dissipated: December 20, 1993

Strongest storm
- Name: BOB 02
  - Maximum winds: 165 km/h (105 mph) (3-minute sustained)
  - Lowest pressure: 968 hPa (mbar)

Seasonal statistics
- Depressions: 4 (Record low)
- Deep depressions: 4
- Cyclonic storms: 2
- Severe cyclonic storms: 2
- Very severe cyclonic storms: 2
- Super cyclonic storms: 0
- Total fatalities: 914
- Total damage: $216 million (1993 USD)

Related articles
- 1993 Atlantic hurricane season; 1993 Pacific hurricane season; 1993 Pacific typhoon season

The 1993 North Indian Ocean cyclone season was the least active on record in the basin, with only four tropical disturbances. There are two main seas in the North Indian Ocean – the Bay of Bengal to the east of the Indian subcontinent and the Arabian Sea to the west. The India Meteorological Department (IMD) issued advisories for the systems in its official capacity as the local Regional Specialized Meteorological Center, while the Joint Typhoon Warning Center also issued advisories for two of the storms on an unofficial basis. Of the five disturbances tracked by the IMD, two intensified into cyclonic storms.

There were no storms before June, and during that month, a deep depression formed off the east coast of India. It brought flooding rains as it moved through Bangladesh and dissipated over northeastern India. The depression struck in the midst of ongoing floods, which were responsible for 200 deaths in the country in June 1993. The next depression – the only to originate over the Arabian Sea in the season – formed on November 8 and moved toward southern India. The system killed 35 people before weakening and turning to the northwest. It re-intensified into a very severe cyclonic storm, but weakened just off the coast of Pakistan due to wind shear. The storm killed 609 people in the country due to flooding. The final two depressions had their origins from the western Pacific basin. In late November, a convective system crossed the Malay Peninsula and developed into an intense tropical cyclone, reaching estimated peak winds of 165 km/h (105 mph) on December 4. While at peak intensity, the cyclone moved ashore southern India near Karaikal, causing widespread damage estimated at US$216 million (1993 USD). The storm killed 70 people and displaced at least 68,000 people. The final depression was the reformation of Typhoon Manny. It dissipated near southern India on December 20, bringing heavy rainfall to the country.

== Season summary ==
The India Meteorological Department (IMD) in New Delhi – the official Regional Specialized Meteorological Center for the northern Indian Ocean as recognized by the World Meteorological Organization – issued warnings for tropical cyclones developing in the region, using satellite imagery and surface data to assess and predict storms. The agency also utilized a tropical cyclone forecast model that used climatology and persistence forecasting to predict future storm movement. Warnings and advisories were broadcast throughout India by telegraph and news media. The basin's activity is sub-divided between the Arabian Sea and the Bay of Bengal on opposite coasts of India, and is generally split before and after the monsoon season. Storms were also tracked on an unofficial basis by the American-based Joint Typhoon Warning Center (JTWC).

During the year, the IMD tracked five tropical disturbances, one of which reformed into a very severe cyclonic storm. Significantly lower than the average of 15 disturbances per year, this made the 1993 season the quietest on record, with two fewer disturbances than the seven that developed in the 1984 season. The inactivity followed the record active 1992 season. The JTWC tracked two tropical cyclones in the basin, the fewest since also tracking two in the 1980 season.

There were no tropical disturbances before the onset of the monsoon season in May, only the eighth time since 1891 for such an occurrence. For the first time since 1891, there was only one system that developed during the monsoon season. There were 14 non-developing low-pressure areas around India that contributed to normal amounts of rainfall for the country. One storm in the year formed in the Arabian Sea in 1993. The final two depressions of the season had their origins from the western Pacific Ocean.

== Systems ==
=== Deep Depression BOB 01 ===
- Deep depression (IMD)
- Duration: June 17 – June 19
- Peak intensity: 55 km/h (35 mph) (3-min); 988 hPa (mbar)

The first depression of the season originated early on June 17 off the east coast of India, about 150 km (95 mi) southwest of Kolkata. The structure was akin to a monsoon depression, as the circulation was broad, and the strongest winds were away from the center. Moving northeastward, the depression made landfall near the border of India and Bangladesh around 09:00 UTC on June 17. As it progressed into Bangladesh, the system intensified further into a deep depression, with maximum sustained winds estimated at 55 km/h (35 mph) by the IMD. In southeastern Bangladesh, a station in Chittagong recorded slightly higher sustained winds of 65 km/h (40 mph). The deep depression weakened as it reached northern Bangladesh, dissipating over Assam in eastern India on June 19.

In Bangladesh, the depression struck in the midst of ongoing floods that began earlier in June. This resulted in additional rainfall, floods, and landslides. Around 103,000 houses were damaged or destroyed, leaving 50,000 people homeless. The floods also washed away bridges and railroad tracks, and damaged 5,002 km (3,108 mi) of roads. Transport links connecting flooded areas to the capital city Dhaka were restored within a few days. Rivers exceeded their banks, isolating tens of thousands of people in northeastern Bangladesh. Storm flooding killed 200 people in the country throughout June. In response to the flooding, the Bangladesh government worked in tandem with non-government organizations to provide food, medicine, and financial assistance to storm victims. The system enhanced the monsoon in eastern India, resulting in heavy rainfall and floods. The Puthimari River, a tributary of the Brahmaputra River in Assam, reached 4.65 m (15.3 ft) above dangerous water levels.

=== Very Severe Cyclonic Storm ARB 01/02 ===
- Very severe cyclonic storm (IMD)
- Category 1 tropical cyclone (SSHWS)
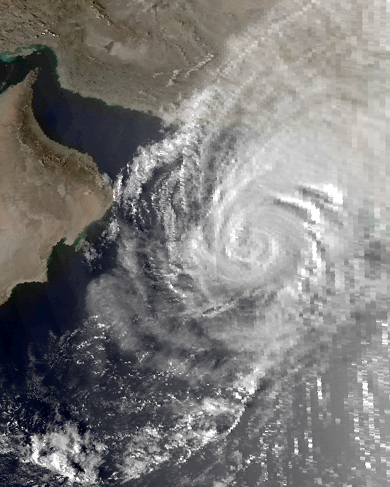
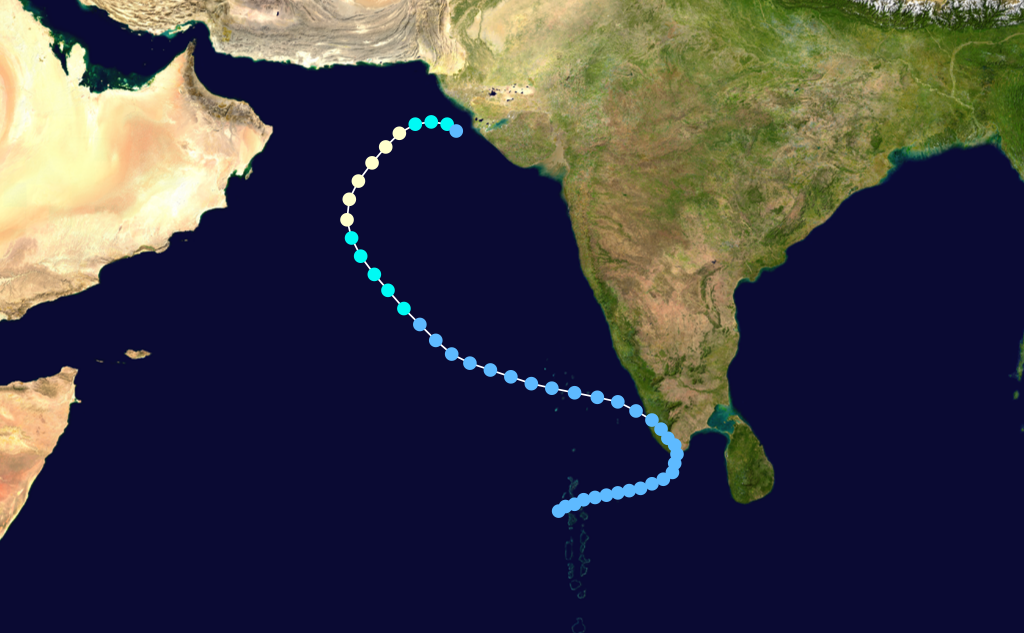
- Duration: November 8 – November 16
- Peak intensity: 120 km/h (75 mph) (3-min); 986 hPa (mbar)

On November 5, the JTWC first monitored an area of convection southwest of India, associated with the Intertropical Convergence Zone. On November 8, the IMD classified the storm as a depression, giving it the identifier ARB 01. The depression moved northeastward toward southern India, moving ashore near Thoothukudi on November 9, and soon degenerated into a remnant low-pressure area. The remnant low of the storm turned back to the northwest and re-emerged into the Arabian Sea. On November 12, it re-intensified into a depression, after convection increased over the center, and the IMD gave the storm a new identifier, ARB 02. Later that day, the JTWC classified the system as Tropical Cyclone 01A. As the storm turned to the north and northeast, it intensified further, based on observations from two ships. The IMD upgraded it to a very severe cyclonic storm on November 14, estimating peak winds of 120 km/h (75 mph). The JTWC estimated higher wind speeds of 150 km/h (95 mph). Wind shear from the westerlies displaced the convection, which continued ahead of the circulation. The center of the storm slowed and turned to the southeast as the winds quickly diminished. By November 16, the system weakened into a remnant low-pressure area off the coast of Gujarat and Sindh.

In southern India, the depression killed 35 people. The cyclone dropped heavy rainfall in western India, reaching 170 mm (6.7 in) in Bhuj, Gujarat. Officials issued storm warnings for Karachi, Pakistan, in anticipation that the cyclone would continue on its trajectory and move inland. The cyclone brought rainfall to widespread areas in southern Sindh province, along with gusty winds, causing power outages and flooding in low-lying areas of the Karachi metropolis. High seas flooded the port of Keti Bandar, forcing residents to seek higher grounds. A fishing boat capsized off the southeast coast of Pakistan; ten of the crew were rescued, but two fishermen drowned. In Thatta and Badin districts, storm flooding killed 609 people and displaced around 200,000 others.

=== Extremely Severe Cyclonic Storm BOB 02 ===
- Extremely severe cyclonic storm (IMD)
- Category 1 tropical cyclone (SSHWS)
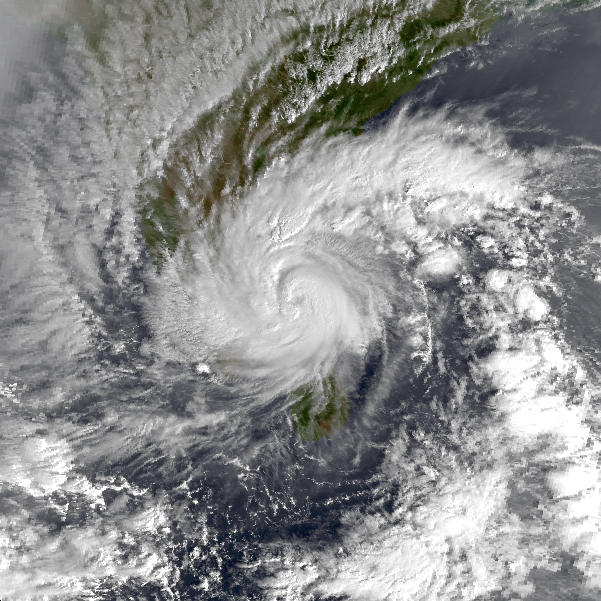
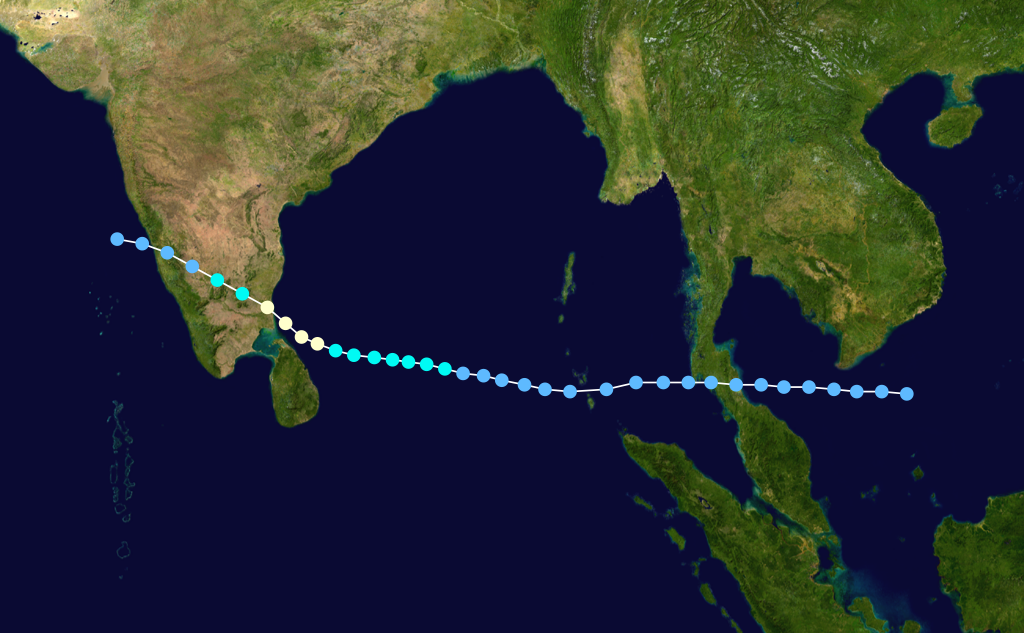
- Duration: December 1 – December 4
- Peak intensity: 165 km/h (105 mph) (3-min); 968 hPa (mbar)

On November 27, the JTWC first mentioned an area of convection south of Vietnam as an area of possible tropical cyclone development. A ridge to the north steered the convective system westward across the Malay Peninsula. The system entered the eastern Bay of Bengal on November 29, and convection increased further in conjunction with a weak circulation. The JTWC classified the system as Tropical Cyclone 02B on November 30, and the IMD designated it as a depression a day later. The storm gradually intensified while moving west-northwestward toward southeastern India, developing an eye in the center of the convection. On December 4 between 04:00–05:00 UTC, the cyclone made landfall near the city of Karaikal, which recorded gusts of 198 km/h (123 mph) during the storm's passage. The IMD estimated peak winds of 165 km/h (105 mph), higher than the JTWC wind estimate of 140 km/h (85 mph). The storm rapidly weakened over land to depression intensity, and the IMD stopped tracking the system late on December 4. The JTWC tracked the system into the Arabian Sea on December 5, where the circulation dissipated shortly thereafter.

Along the northwest coast of Sri Lanka, the cyclone's flow produced a .5 m (1.6 ft) storm surge. The IMD issued hourly warnings for southern India in advance of the cyclone, through electronic and print media. Around 40,000 people evacuated their houses near the coast. Across southern India, the cyclone killed 70 people and left US$216 million in damage (1993 USD). Heavy rainfall reached over 300 mm (12 in) in southern Andhra Pradesh, causing landslides and flooding. The Sathanur Dam exceeded its capacity, forcing hundreds of people to leave their homes in Pondicherry. A 3 to 4 m (9.8 to 13.1 ft) storm surge flooded 60 coastal villages, and waters reached 22 km (14 mi) inland. Around 12,000 people had to be rescued from inaccessible areas after the cyclone struck. Train service was halted in and out of Chennai. Roadways across Tamil Nadu were damaged or blocked by fallen trees, after high winds uprooted hundreds of trees and snapped power lines. Hundreds of thousands of people in southern India were left without power or water service. The cyclone also damaged over 44,000 houses, of which 20,000 were in Pondicherry alone, where about 68,000 people were displaced. Knee-deep waters ruined 41,520 ha (102,600 acres) of crop fields.

After the storm, local governments worked to restore power lines and damaged roads, while also providing food and fuel to affected residents.

=== Deep Depression BOB 03 ===
- Deep depression (IMD)
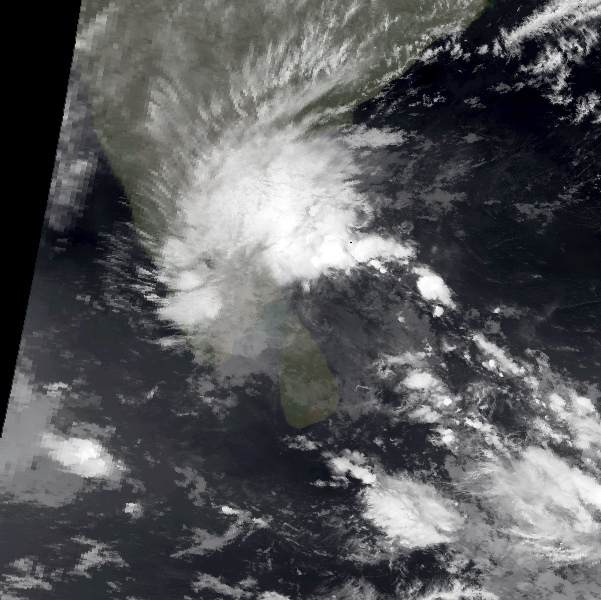
- Duration: December 19 – December 20
- Peak intensity: 55 km/h (35 mph) (3-min); 1006 hPa (mbar)

Typhoon Manny, a long-tracked storm in the western Pacific Ocean, dissipated as a tropical cyclone over the Malay Peninsula on December 15. The system emerged into the Andaman Sea on the next day, and continued westward across the Bay of Bengal. It evolved into a low-pressure area on December 18, and intensified into the final depression of the season on the next day. Moving northwestward, the system passed northeast of Sri Lanka while moving northwestward. It weakened while approaching southern India, dissipating near the coast of Tamil Nadu. The depression brought locally heavy rainfall to Tamil Nadu and Puducherry.

== Season effects ==
Name	Dates	Peak intensity			Areas affected	Damage (USD)	Deaths	Ref(s).
Name	Dates	Category	Wind speed	Pressure	Areas affected	Damage (USD)	Deaths	Ref(s).
BOB 01	June 17–19	Deep Depression	55 km/h (35 mph)	988 hPa (29.18 inHg)	India, Bangladesh	Heavy	<200	
ARB 01/02	November 8–16	Very Severe Cyclonic Storm	120 km/h (75 mph)	986 hPa (29.12 inHg)	India, Pakistan	Unknown	644	
BOB 02	December 1–4	Extremely Severe Cyclonic Storm	165 km/h (105 mph)	968 hPa (28.59 inHg)	India	$216 million	70	
BOB 03	December 19–20	Deep Depression	55 km/h (35 mph)	1,006 hPa (29.71 inHg)	Southern India	None	None	
Season aggregates
4 systems	June 17 – December 20		165 km/h (105 mph)	968 hPa (28.59 inHg)		>$216 million	914	

== See also ==
- North Indian Ocean tropical cyclone
- 1993 Atlantic hurricane season
- 1993 Pacific hurricane season
- 1993 Pacific typhoon season
- South-West Indian Ocean cyclone season: 1992–93, 1993–94
- Australian region cyclone season: 1992–93, 1993–94
- South Pacific cyclone season: 1992–93, 1993–94
