= 1993 Atlantic hurricane season =

- Season summary map

Seasonal boundaries
- First system formed: May 31, 1993
- Last system dissipated: September 30, 1993

Strongest storm
- Name: Emily
  - Maximum winds: 115 mph (185 km/h) (1-minute sustained)
  - Lowest pressure: 960 mbar (hPa; 28.35 inHg)

Seasonal statistics
- Total depressions: 10
- Total storms: 8
- Hurricanes: 4
- Major hurricanes (Cat. 3+): 1
- ACE: 39
- Total fatalities: 382 total
- Total damage: > $322.3 million (1993 USD)

Related articles
- Timeline of the 1993 Atlantic hurricane season; 1993 Pacific hurricane season; 1993 Pacific typhoon season; 1993 North Indian Ocean cyclone season

The 1993 Atlantic hurricane season was a below average, yet deadly Atlantic hurricane season, mainly due to Tropical Storm Bret and Hurricane Gert. The season produced ten tropical cyclones, eight tropical storms, four hurricanes, and one major hurricane. It officially started on June 1 and ended on November 30, dates which conventionally delimit the period during which most tropical cyclones form in the Atlantic Ocean. The first tropical cyclone, Tropical Depression One, developed on May 31, while the final storm, Tropical Depression Ten, dissipated on September 30, well before the average dissipation date of a season's last tropical cyclone; this represented the earliest end to the hurricane season in ten years.

The most intense hurricane, Emily, was a Category 3 on the Saffir–Simpson Hurricane Scale that paralleled close to the North Carolina coastline causing minor damage and a few deaths before moving out to sea. The most destructive named storm of the season was Hurricane Gert, a tropical cyclone that devastated several countries in Central America and Mexico. Throughout the impact areas, damage totaled to $170 million (1993 USD) (Note: All damage figures are in 1993 USD, unless otherwise noted) and 102 fatalities were reported. The remnants of Gert reached the Pacific Ocean and was classified as Tropical Depression Fourteen-E. The deadliest system was Tropical Storm Bret, which resulted in 184 deaths, in addition to causing $25 million in losses as it tracked generally westward across Trinidad, Venezuela, Colombia, and Nicaragua. In the Pacific Ocean, the remnants of Bret were attributed to the development of Hurricane Greg. Three other tropical cyclones brought minor to moderate effects on land; they were Tropical Depression One and Tropical Storms Arlene and Cindy. The storms of the 1993 Atlantic hurricane season collectively caused 382 fatalities and $322.3 million in losses.

== Seasonal forecasts ==
Predictions of tropical activity in the 1993 season
Source	Date	Named storms	Hurricanes	Major hurricanes	Ref
CSU	December 1992	11	6	3
CSU	April 16	11	6	3
WRC	Early 1993	7	5	N/A
CSU	June	11	7	3
CSU	August	11	6	3
Record high activity		30	15	7 (Tie)
Record low activity		1	0 (tie)	0
Actual activity		8	4	1

Forecasts of hurricane activity are issued before each hurricane season by Dr. William M. Gray and his associates at Colorado State University (CSU) and the Weather Research Center (WRC). A normal season as defined by the National Oceanic and Atmospheric Administration (NOAA) has 12.1 named storms, of which 6.4 reach hurricane strength, and 2.7 become major hurricanes. (Note: A major hurricane is a tropical cyclone with maximum sustained winds of at least 111 mph (179 km/h), or a Category 3 or higher on the Saffir-Simpson scale.) In December 1992, Gray anticipated a near average season with 11 named storms, 6 hurricanes, and 3 major hurricanes. Another predication on April 16, 1993 was unchanged from the previous forecast. In June, Gray revised the number of hurricanes to seven, though the forecast of named storms and major hurricanes remained the same. By August, the number hurricanes predicted was lowered back to six, matching the December 1992 and April forecasts. The sole prediction made by the WRC called for seven named storms and five hurricanes, though no forecast was made on the numbers of major hurricanes.

== Season summary ==
The Atlantic hurricane season officially began on June 1, thus activity began a day early with the development of Tropical Depression One on May 31. It was a below average season in which 10 tropical depressions formed. Eight of the depressions attained tropical storm status, and four of these attained hurricane status. In addition, one tropical cyclone eventually attained major hurricane status, which is below the 1981–2010 average of 2.7 per season. The low amount of activity is attributed to abnormally strong wind shear across the Atlantic basin. Only one hurricane and three tropical storms made landfall during the season; Tropical Depression One and Hurricane Emily also caused land impacts. However, the storm collectively caused 382 deaths and $322.3 million in damage. The last storm of the season, Tropical Depression Ten, became extratropical on September 30, two months before the official end of the season on November 30.

Tropical cyclogenesis in the 1993 Atlantic hurricane season began with the development of Tropical Depression One on May 31. However, in the following two months, minimal activity occurred, with only one named storm, Arlene, in June. August was the most active month, with four systems developing: Tropical Storms Bret, Cindy, and Dennis, as well as Hurricane Emily. September, normally the climatological peak of hurricane season, had only three named storms form: Hurricanes Floyd, Gert, and Harvey. The final Atlantic tropical cyclone of 1993, Tropical Depression Ten, became extratropical on September 30, two months before the official end of the season on November 30.

Overall, the season's activity was reflected with an accumulated cyclone energy (ACE) rating of 39. ACE is, broadly speaking, a measure of the power of the hurricane multiplied by the length of time it existed, so storms that last a long time, as well as particularly strong hurricanes, have high ACEs. ACE is only calculated for full advisories on tropical systems at or exceeding 34 knots (39 mph; 63 km/h) or tropical storm strength. Subtropical cyclones are excluded from the total.

== Systems ==
=== Tropical Depression One ===
- Tropical depression (SSHWS)
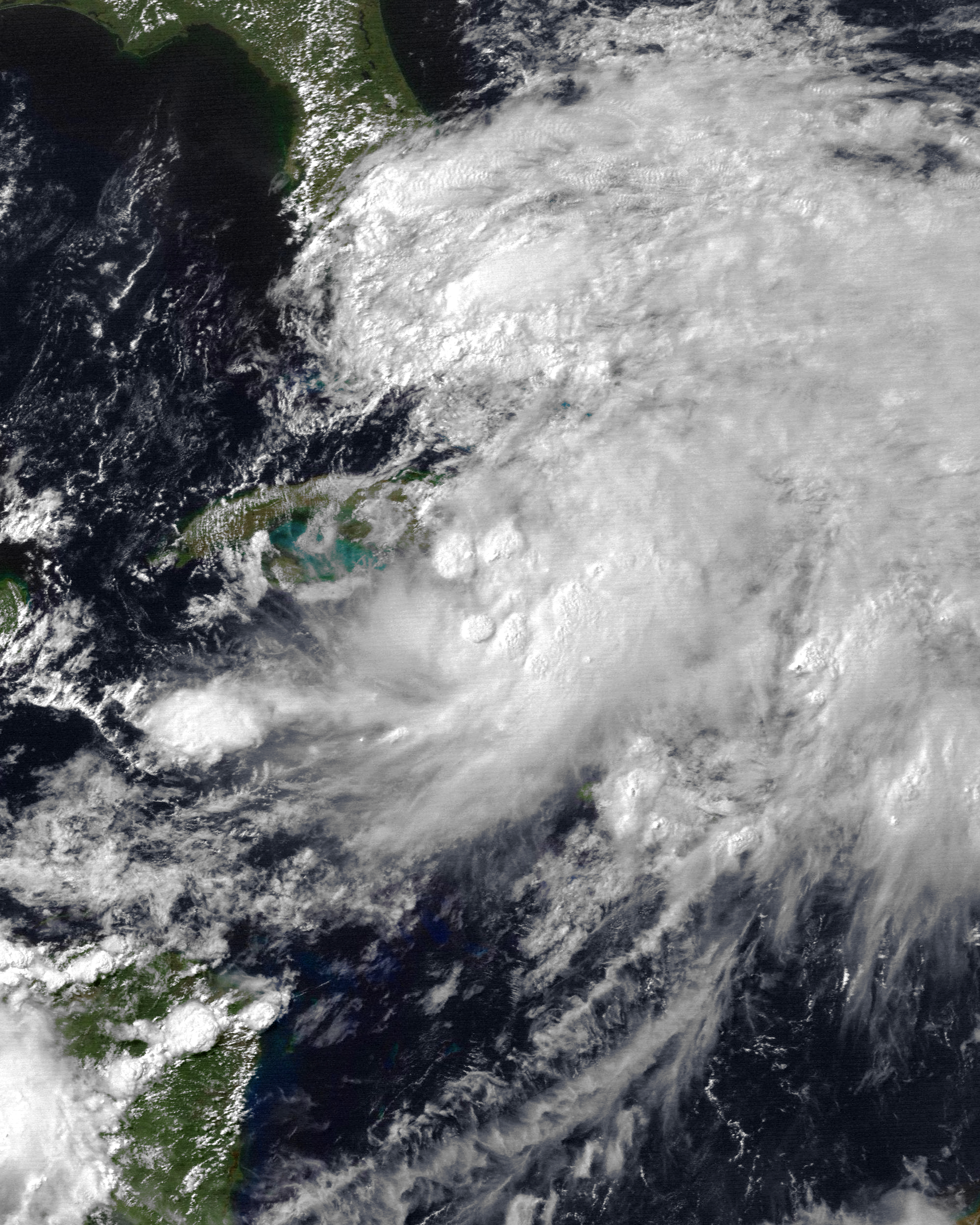
- Duration: May 31 – June 2
- Peak intensity: 35 mph (55 km/h) (1-min); 999 mbar (hPa)

The origins of the tropical depression were from a tropical wave that exited the coast of Africa on May 13. It crossed the Atlantic Ocean and Caribbean Sea, reaching a position east of the Yucatan Peninsula by May 25. The system interacted with a monsoon-type circulation over Central America, and a broad low-level circulation developed near Cozumel, Mexico. Atmospheric pressure in the region fell gradually as the system organized, and on May 31, the National Hurricane Center classified it as Tropical Depression One near the Isle of Youth. At the time of being upgraded, the circulation was located on the northwest side of the convection due to wind shear. Throughout its duration, the depression maintained a northeast track, due to an approaching shortwave trough to its north. Late on May 31, the poorly organized center crossed western Cuba. By the time the circulation reached the Florida Straits, it was exposed and removed from the convection. The depression accelerated northeastward through the Bahamas, passing near Nassau. Based on Hurricane Hunters observations, it maintained stronger winds in squalls away from the center, and the pressure deepened to 999 mbar (999 hPa; 29.5 inHg). By June 2, reconnaissance flights into the system had difficulty discerning a circulation. Later that day, the National Hurricane Center discontinued advisories, as the depression had become extratropical. It strengthened slightly to reach gale-force winds as an extratropical storm, and persisted until early on June 3.

The precursor to the disturbance brought locally heavy rainfall to the Yucatán Peninsula, with a maximum of 7.09 inches (18.0 cm) in Lázaro Cárdenas, Quintana Roo. The depression produced intense precipitation across central and eastern Cuba, peaking at 12.4 inches (31 cm) in Topes de Collantes. In Victoria de Las Tunas, a rainfall total of 8.6 inches (22 cm) set the new record most rainfall in 24 hours. The rainfall caused flooding of rivers and lakes behind dams, and in some places, residents required rescue from the roofs of their houses. Officials forced the evacuation of 40,000 people in several provinces, and across the country, the storm destroyed 1,860 homes and damaged 16,500 more. The flooding blocked mountainous highways in Santiago de Cuba Province, and in Las Tunas Province railway lines were damaged. Widespread crop damage occurred just two months after the Storm of the Century left similar heavy damage. The flooding damaged 87 sugar production centers. The depression killed seven people in the country. After the storm passed, the Cuban government activated the Civil Defense, while National Relief Services worked to rescue all people affected by the flooding. Elsewhere along its path, heavy rainfall was reported in Jamaica, Hispaniola, and southern Florida. In Haiti, the rainfall caused 13 deaths and left thousands of livestock killed. In Florida, the precipitation peaked at 9.99 inches (25.4 cm) in Canal Point near Lake Okeechobee. The precipitation as a whole alleviated drought conditions.

=== Tropical Storm Arlene ===
- Tropical storm (SSHWS)
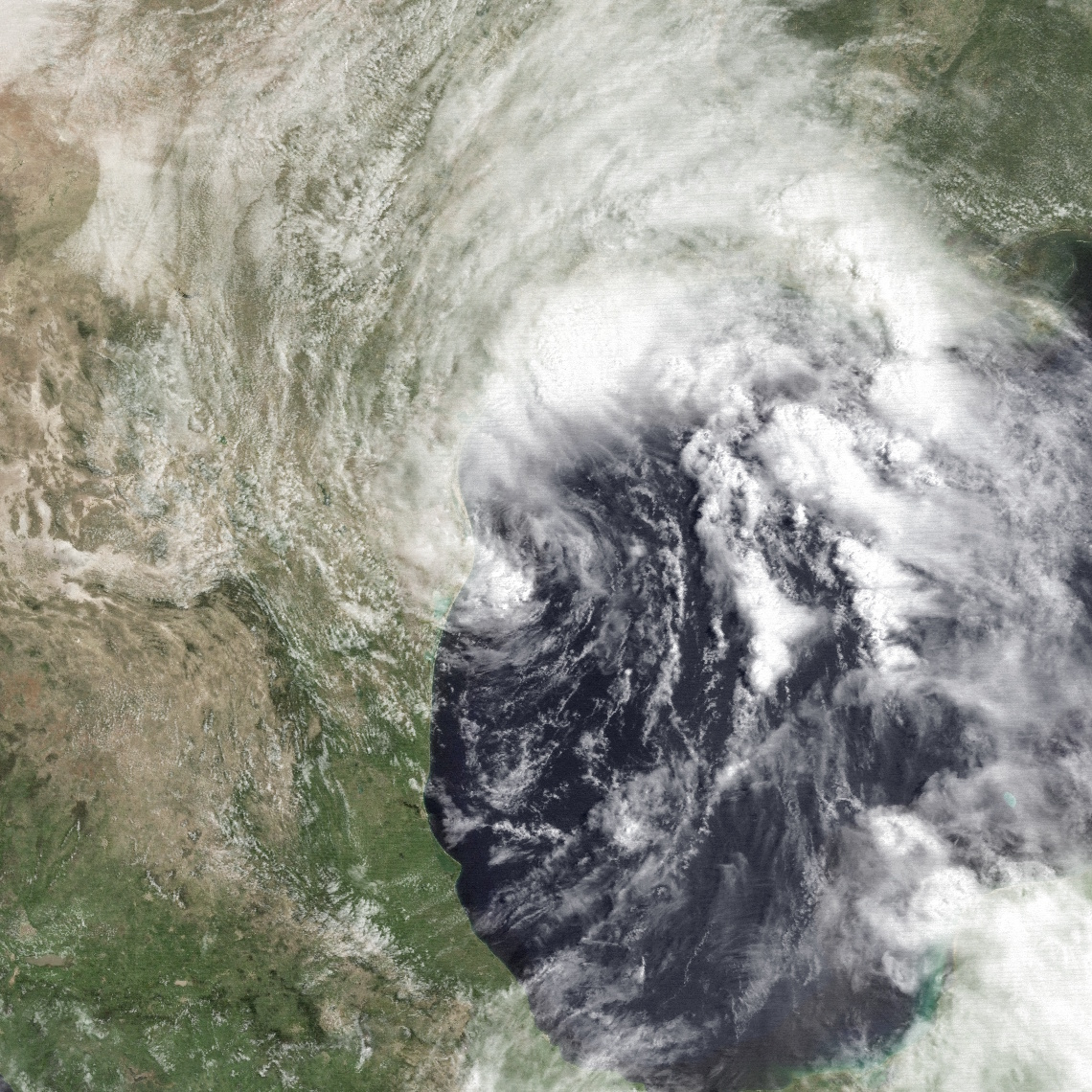
- Duration: June 18 – June 21
- Peak intensity: 40 mph (65 km/h) (1-min); 1000 mbar (hPa)

A tropical wave was tracked in the Caribbean Sea beginning on June 9 and subsequently moved across Central America. Eventually, the system entered the Gulf of Mexico, though further development was interrupted by unfavorable wind shear. After conditions became somewhat more favorable, the wave developed into Tropical Depression Two on June 18. The depression slowly strengthened as it tracked west-northwestward and eventually north-northwestward across the western Gulf of Mexico. By June 19, the depression became Tropical Storm Arlene. At 09:00 UTC on the following day, Arlene made landfall on Padre Island, Texas with winds of 40 mph (64 km/h). The storm quickly weakened inland and degenerated into a remnant low pressure area on June 21.

In El Salvador, rainfall from the precursor tropical wave caused mudslides throughout the country, which in turn resulted in 20 fatalities. Immense amounts of precipitation in Mexico caused flooding in the states of Veracruz, Campeche, Yucatán, San Luis Potosí, Quintana Roo, Nuevo León, and Jalisco. Five deaths and $33 million in damage was reported in Mexico. Arlene also dropped torrential rainfall in Texas, peaking at 15.26 in (388 mm) Angleton, while precipitation amounts elsewhere was mainly between 9 and 11 in (230 and 280 mm). Throughout the state, numerous roads were inundated and more than 650 houses, including 25 mobile homes, suffered water damage. Agriculture losses in eastern Texas include 20% of cantaloupe, 10% of watermelon, and 18% of tomatoes. One fatality occurred and damage in Texas reached $22 million. Overall, Tropical Storm Arlene caused 26 deaths and $55 million in losses.

=== Tropical Storm Bret ===
- Tropical storm (SSHWS)
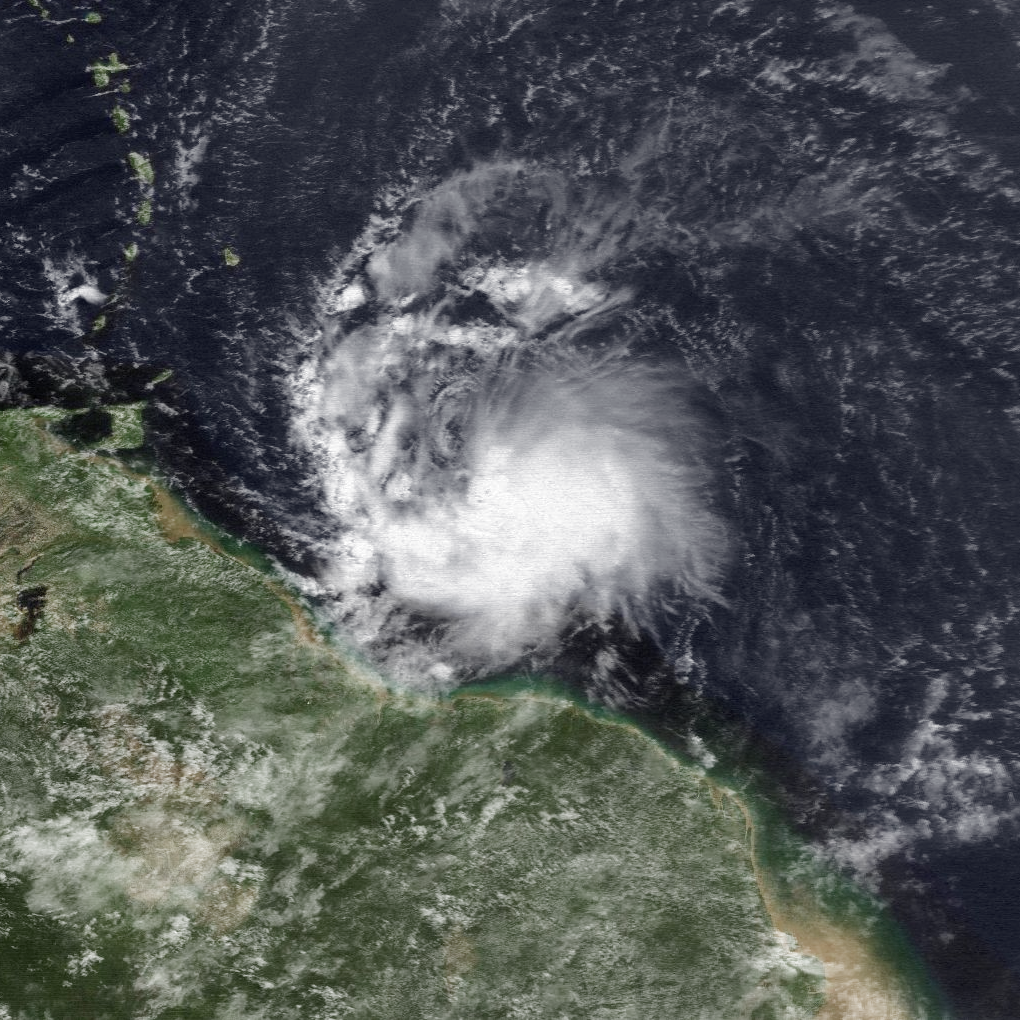
- Duration: August 4 – August 11
- Peak intensity: 60 mph (95 km/h) (1-min); 1002 mbar (hPa)

A westward-moving tropical wave developed into Tropical Depression Three while located about 1,150 miles (1,850 km) west of Cape Verde on August 4. The depression strengthened and was upgraded to Tropical Storm Bret on the following day. It strengthened slightly and reached winds of 60 mph (97 km/h) and maintained that intensity until crossing Trinidad on August 7. Later that day, Bret made landfall near Macuro, Venezuela, before briefly re-emerging into the Caribbean Sea. Bret made another landfall in Venezuela on August 8 and crossed northern Colombia. It weakened over the mountainous terrain and fell to tropical depression intensity over the southwestern Caribbean Sea. Bret re-strengthened to a 45 mph (72 km/h) tropical storm before making landfall in southern Nicaragua on August 10. It crossed into the Pacific Ocean and dissipated, although it later regenerated into Hurricane Greg.

In Trinidad, winds left 35,000 people without electricity, while rainfall caused minor damage to crops and roads, with losses totaling to about $909,000. Rainfall in Venezuela reached 13.3 in (340 mm) in some areas. As a result, widespread mudslides were reported, which in turn destroyed 10,000 houses and caused 173 deaths. One fatality was reported in neighboring Colombia. In Nicaragua, the storm destroyed 850 houses and damaged an additional 1,500. Overall, 35,000 people were left homeless in that country. In addition, the destruction of 25 medical centers, 10 schools, and 10 churches occurred. Road infrastructure damage was also reported, with 12 bridges collapsing during the passage of Bret. There were 10 fatalities in Nicaragua, 9 of which were drowning victims after a Spanish vessel sank. Overall, Tropical Storm Bret caused 184 deaths and about $25 million in damage.

=== Tropical Storm Cindy ===
- Tropical storm (SSHWS)
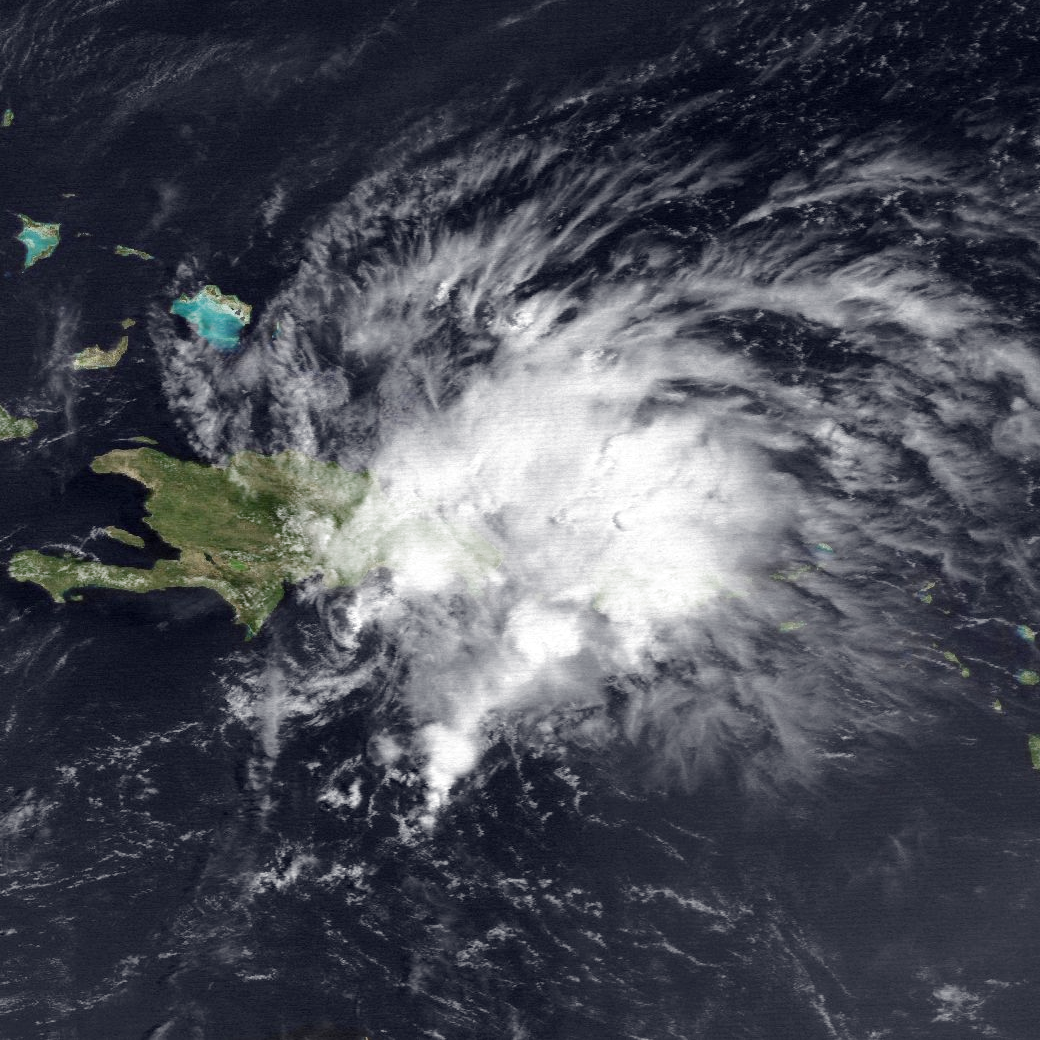
- Duration: August 14 – August 17
- Peak intensity: 45 mph (75 km/h) (1-min); 1007 mbar (hPa)

A tropical wave entered the Atlantic Ocean from northwest Africa on August 8. It traversed the Atlantic and organized into Tropical Depression Four on August 14, while located within 100 mi (160 km) to the north of Barbados. After six hours, the depression strengthened into Tropical Storm Cindy, while crossing the island of Martinique. Due to a poor upper-level structure, Cindy barely intensified as it tracked west-northwestward across the eastern Caribbean Sea. Nonetheless, the storm peaked with winds of 45 mph (72 km/h) on August 16. However, interaction with the terrain of Hispaniola caused Cindy to weaken. Late on August 16, the storm had been reduced to a tropical depression, around the time of landfall near Barahona, Dominican Republic. Cindy rapidly weakened inland and dissipated by early on August 17.

The storm dropped torrential rainfall in Martinique, peaking at 15.55 in (395 mm) in Saint-Joseph, which fell in only two hours. Further, 2.75 in (70 mm) fell in just six minutes. Several rivers overflowed as a result, which in turn caused widespread flooding and mudslides. Several roads were washed out, numerous cars were swept away, and at least 150 houses were destroyed, leaving about 3,000 people homeless. Overall, the storm caused two fatalities, 11 injuries, and ₣107 million (US$19 million) in damage. On other Lesser Antilles, the storm caused minimally impact, limited to mostly small amounts of precipitation, light winds, and minor beach erosion, especially on Puerto Rico. In Dominican Republic, street and minor river flooding was reported, which affected hundreds of residents. In addition, Cindy left two deaths in the Dominican Republic.

=== Hurricane Emily ===
- Category 3 hurricane (SSHWS)
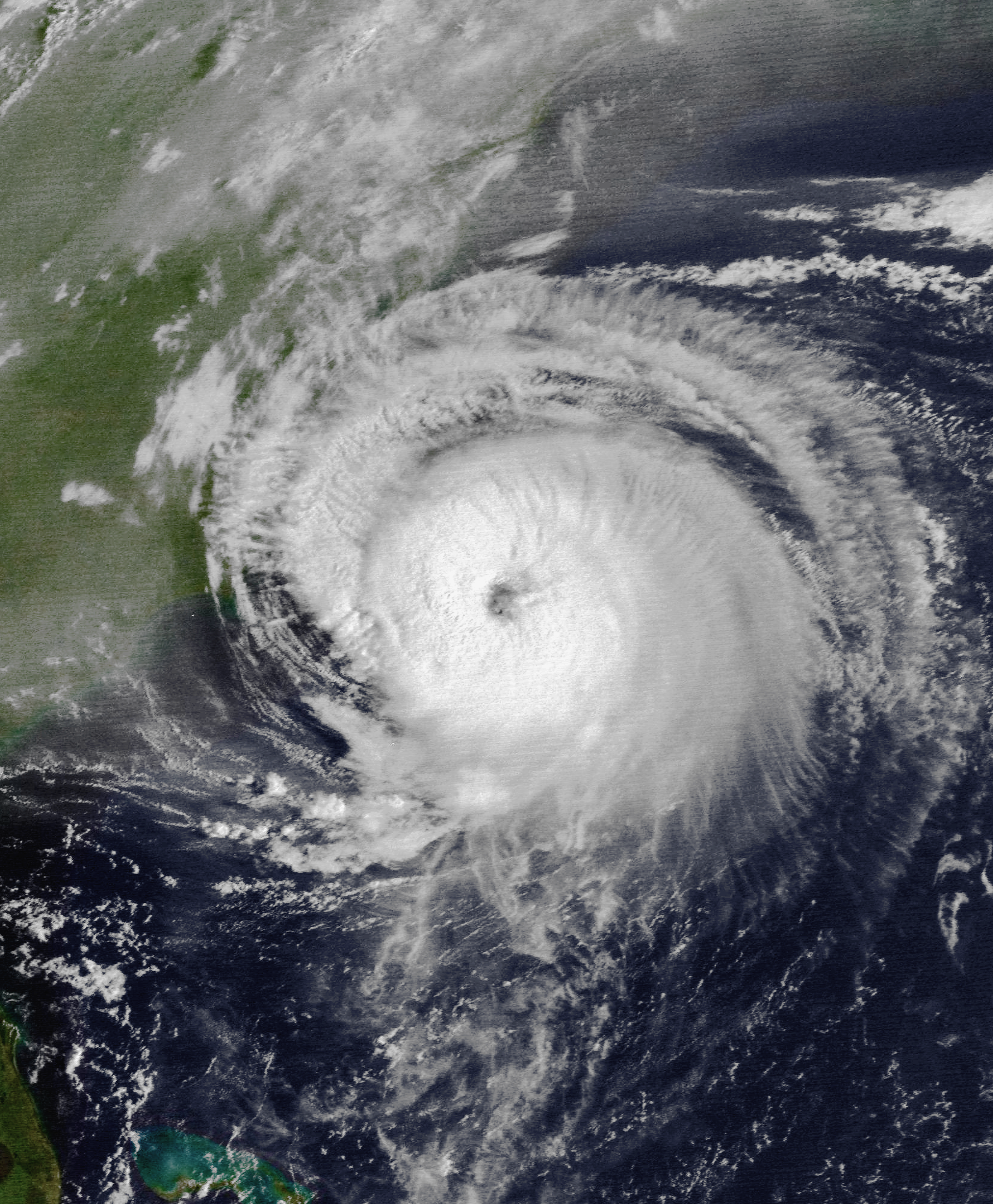
- Duration: August 22 – September 6
- Peak intensity: 115 mph (185 km/h) (1-min); 960 mbar (hPa)

A tropical wave passed through Cape Verde on August 17. The system moved northwestward and slowly acquired a low-level center of circulation. At 18:00 UTC on August 22, Tropical Depression Five developed while located several hundred miles east-northeast of the Lesser Antilles on August 22. Initially, it headed northwestward while minimal intensification, though by August 25, the depression was upgraded to Tropical Storm Emily. The storm then became nearly stationary while southeast of Bermuda and steadily strengthened during that time. Late on August 26, Emily briefly became a hurricane, though it weakened back to a tropical storm early on the following day. However, by late on August 27, Emily was a hurricane once again. The storm then moved northwestward and maintained Category 1 intensity until becoming a Category 2 hurricane on August 31. By 18:00 UTC, Emily became a Category 3 hurricane while just offshore Cape Hatteras.

However, the storm veered out to sea later on August 29 and weakened, falling to tropical storm intensity while located northeast of Bermuda on September 3. After curving southward and then back to the northeast, Emily weakened to a tropical depression on September 4. The storm lost all tropical characteristics on September 6, while located several hundred miles southeast of Newfoundland. The outer bands of Emily lashed the Outer Banks of North Carolina with heavy rainfall, high tides, and strong winds. The combination of those effects damaged 553 homes beyond repair. Sinkholes formed along North Carolina Highway 12 and strong winds uprooted trees, downed power lines, and tore off roofs. Further north, two fishermen near Nags Head drowned, while a 15-year-old boy also drowned. Light rainfall was also reported in Maryland and Delaware. Losses reached $45 million, with all damage in North Carolina.

=== Tropical Storm Dennis ===
- Tropical storm (SSHWS)
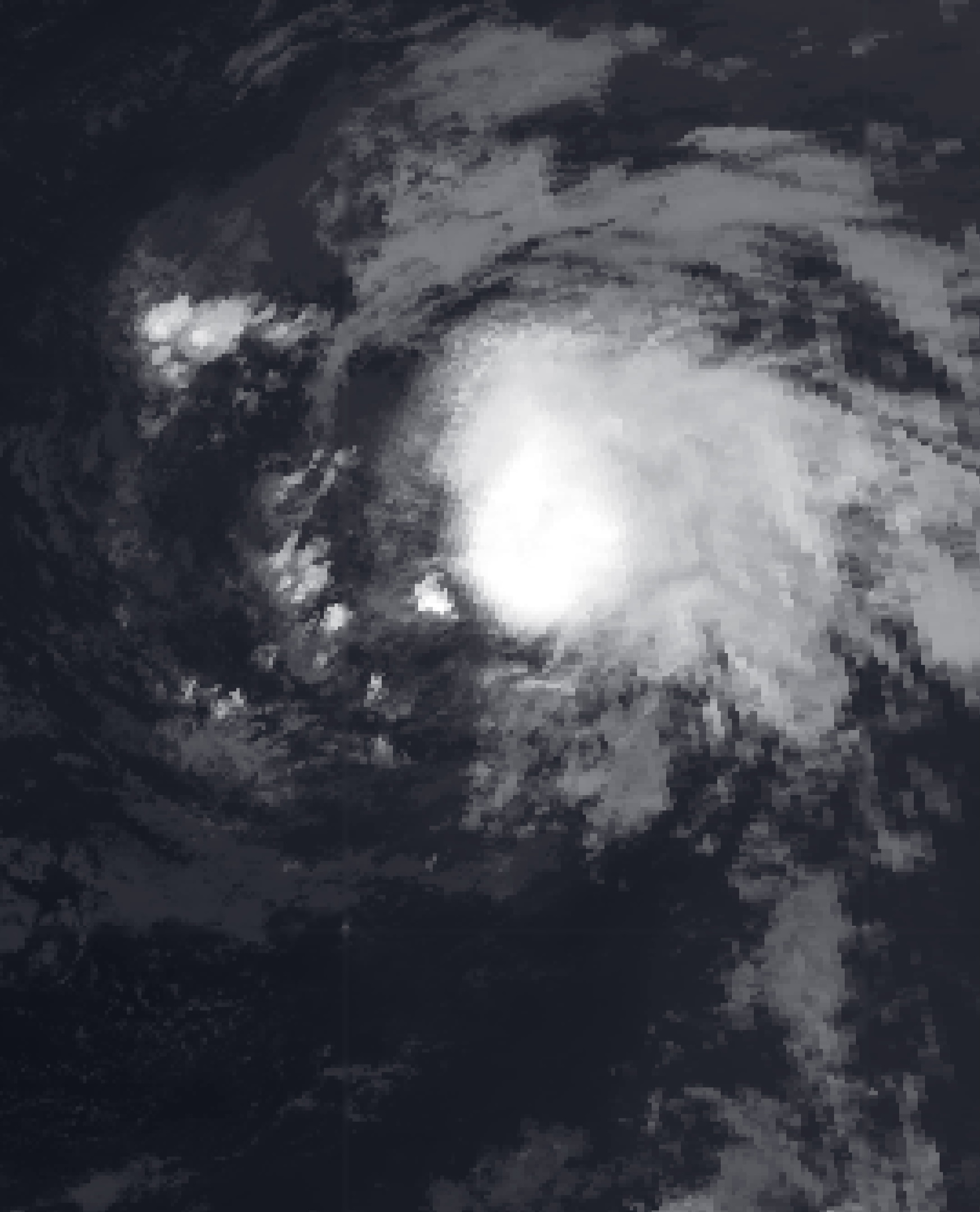
- Duration: August 23 – August 28
- Peak intensity: 50 mph (85 km/h) (1-min); 1000 mbar (hPa)

A tropical wave and its associated low pressure area emerged into the Atlantic from the west coast of Africa on August 21. By the following day, two METEOSAT satellites indicated that the system had a distinct cyclonic rotation and increasing deep convection. At 12:00 UTC on August 23, Tropical Depression Six developed while located about 415 mi (668 km) west-southwest of Brava, Cape Verde. Initially, a weak deep-layer mean flow caused the depression to track west-northwest. It is estimated that by 12:00 UTC on August 24, the depression became Tropical Storm Dennis, based on satellite imagery.

Early on August 25, Dennis attained its peak intensity with winds of 50 mph (80 km/h) and a minimum barometric pressure of 1,000 mbar (30 inHg). After peak intensity, a relatively strong mid- to upper-level trough caused Dennis to turn north-northwestward on August 26. Thereafter, an increase in vertical wind shear and a decrease in sea surface temperatures caused the storm to begin weakening. Eventually, the low-level circulation became nearly void of deep convection. On August 27, Dennis was downgraded to a tropical depression. The storm later curved west-southwestward, while located about midway between Bermuda and the southernmost islands of Cape Verde.

=== Hurricane Floyd ===
- Category 1 hurricane (SSHWS)
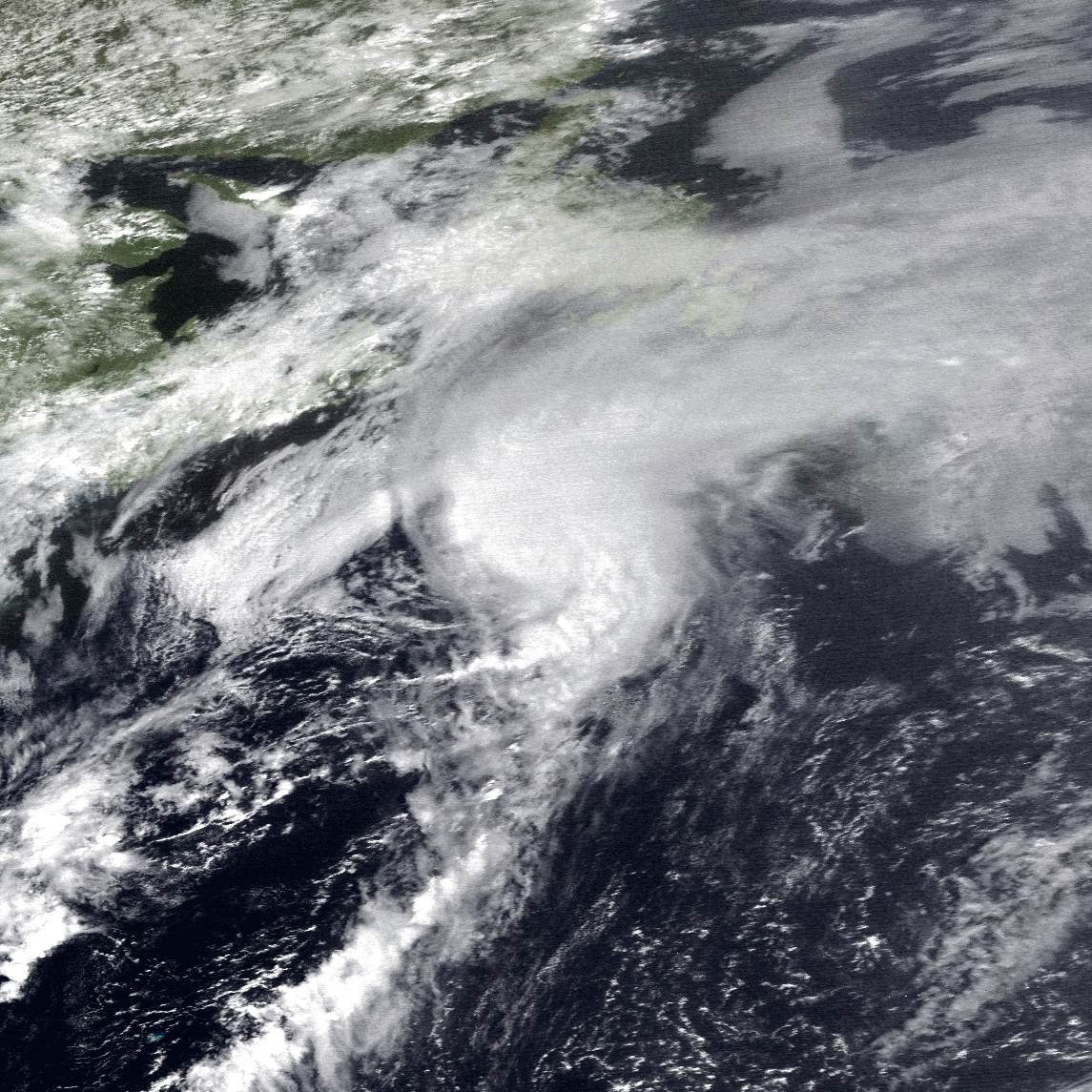
- Duration: September 7 – September 10
- Peak intensity: 75 mph (120 km/h) (1-min); 990 mbar (hPa)

A tropical wave crossed the west coast of Africa on August 28. Although had it a well-defined low-level circulation, the system was not classified as a tropical cyclone. While tracking west, deep convection diminished and was nearly non-existent by August 31, though the cloud pattern began re-developing on September 3. Eventually, the system curved northwestward and remained well away from the Lesser Antilles. Because a reconnaissance flight into the system indicated a low-level circulation with persistent deep convection, it is estimated that the system became Tropical Depression Seven at 12:00 UTC on September 7, while located about 440 mi (710 km) north-northwest of San Juan, Puerto Rico. Only six hours after becoming a tropical cyclone, the depression strengthened into Tropical Storm Floyd. Initially, strong southwesterly wind shear prevented further significant intensification.

The storm accelerated north-northwestward after becoming embedded within fast air currents, which was as Floyd moved between a strong trough and a subtropical high pressure area. Later on September 8, the storm passed about 230 mi (370 km) west of Bermuda. By early on September 9, convection developed along the once exposed low-level circulation. After a buoy reported a two-minute sustained wind speed of 69 mph (111 km/h) and an eye appeared on satellite imagery, Floyd was upgraded to a hurricane at 18:00 UTC on September 9. While accelerating at nearly 52 mph (84 km/h), the storm began losing tropical characteristics as a result of colder sea surface temperatures and became extratropical at 18:00 UTC on September 10. The remnants of Floyd continued rapidly eastward and struck Brittany, France, at an intensity equivalent to a Category 1 hurricane. While passing southeast of Newfoundland, the storm produced light rainfall, peaking at about 0.86 in (22 mm).

=== Hurricane Gert ===
- Category 2 hurricane (SSHWS)
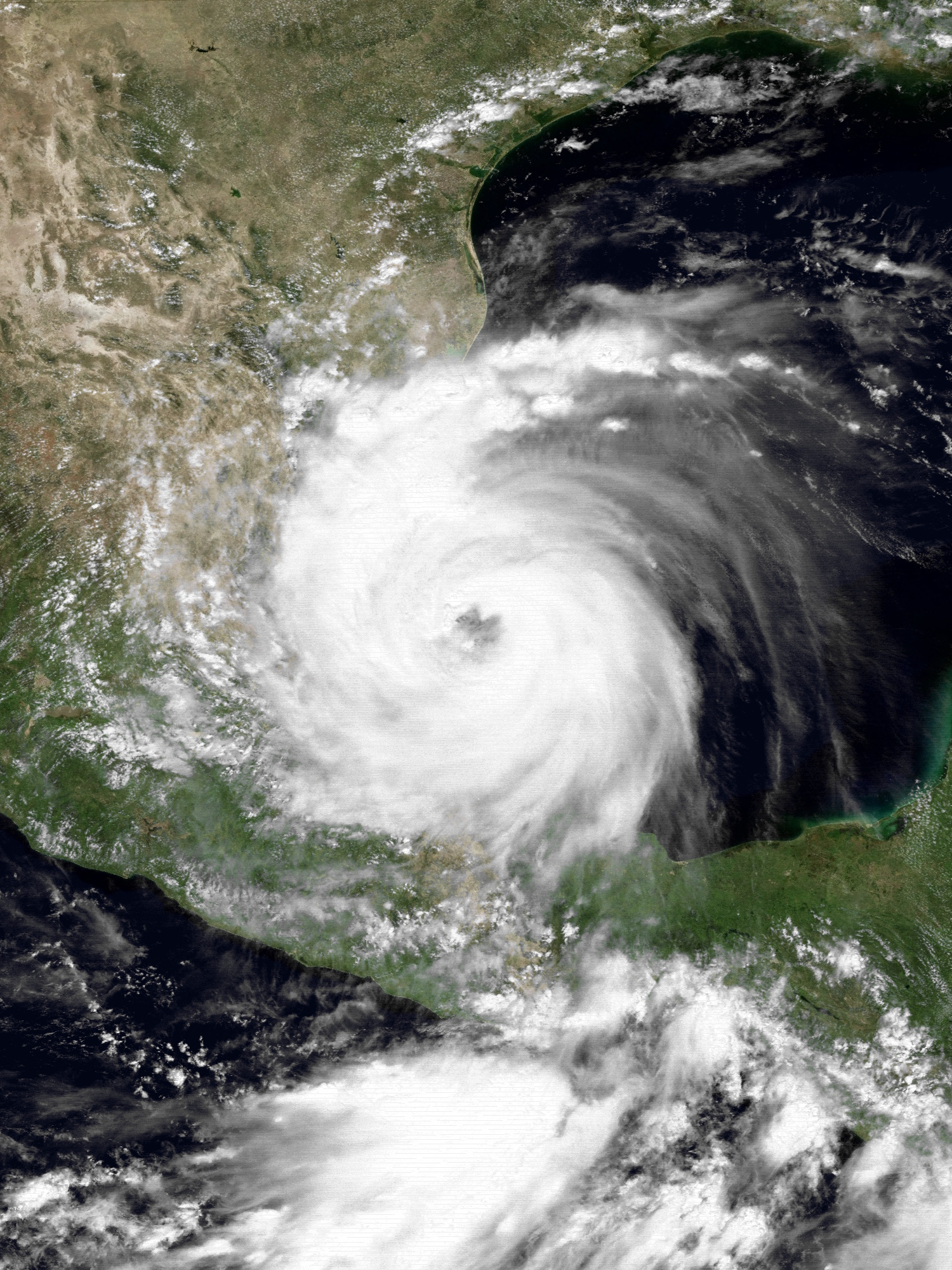
- Duration: September 14 – September 21
- Peak intensity: 100 mph (155 km/h) (1-min); 970 mbar (hPa)

A tropical wave emerged into the Atlantic Ocean from the west coast of Africa on September 5. The system slowly organize while tracking across the Atlantic Ocean and much of the Caribbean Sea. It developed into a tropical depression while located north of Panama on September 14. On the following day, the depression was upgraded to Tropical Storm Gert before moving ashore in Nicaragua. After weakening to a tropical depression, it proceeded into Honduras and reorganized into a tropical storm over the Gulf of Honduras on September 17. Gert made landfall in Belize on the following day and again weakened to a depression while inland. After crossing the Yucatán Peninsula, Gert emerged over warm water in the Bay of Campeche, and strengthened into a Category 2 hurricane on September 20. The hurricane then made landfall on the Gulf Coast of Mexico near Tuxpan, Veracruz, with winds of 100 mph (160 km/h). Rugged terrain quickly disrupted its structure and Gert entered the Pacific Ocean as a tropical depression from Nayarit on September 21. Five days later, the depression dissipated near Baja California.

Because Gert had a broad wind circulation, it produced widespread and heavy rainfall across Central America, which, combined with saturated soil from Tropical Storm Bret a month earlier, caused significant flooding of property and crops. Although hurricane-force winds occurred upon landfall in Mexico, the worst effects in the country were due to flooding and mudslides induced by torrential rain. Following the overflow of several rivers, deep flood waters submerged extensive parts of Veracruz and Tamaulipas and forced hundreds of thousands to evacuate, including 200,000 in the Tampico area alone. The heaviest rainfall occurred further inland over the mountainous region of San Luis Potosí, where as much as 31.41 in (798 mm) of precipitation were measured. In the wake of the disaster, the road networks across the affected countries were severely disrupted and thousands of people became homeless. Extensive, but less severe flooding occurred in Costa Rica, El Salvador, Guatemala, Honduras, and Nicaragua. Throughout the effected areas, flooding damaged or destroyed more than 40,000 buildings. The storm caused at least 102 fatalities and more than $170 million in damage.

=== Hurricane Harvey ===
- Category 1 hurricane (SSHWS)
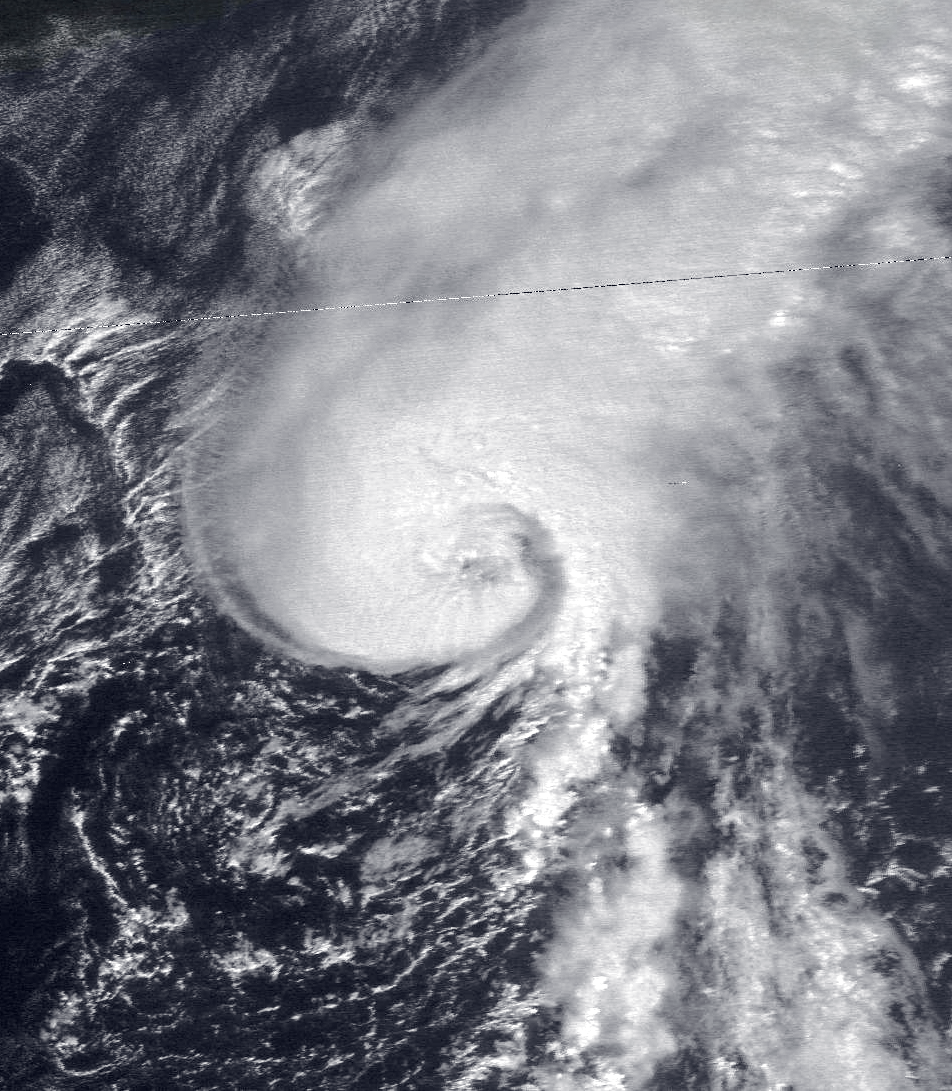
- Duration: September 18 – September 21
- Peak intensity: 75 mph (120 km/h) (1-min); 990 mbar (hPa)

A tropical wave passed south of Cape Verde on September 12. By the following day, satellite imagery indicated a cloud system center. The system tracked northwestward across the Atlantic Ocean with slow further development. Due to interaction with an upper-level low on September 18, the system began to significantly organize. After a ship known as ELFS reported winds of 43 mph (69 km/h), it is estimated that Tropical Depression Nine developed at 18:00 UTC on September 18, while located about 400 miles (640 km) south-southeast of Bermuda. The depression initially moved north-northwest, though an approaching short-wave trough eventually caused it to move northeastward.

Convection remained disorganized and the low-level circulation was exposed on September 19. However, by the following day, the depression strengthened into Tropical Storm Harvey. Thereafter, the storm began to rapidly intensify and developed an eye appeared on satellite imagery. While accelerating northeastward, Harvey was upgraded to a hurricane at 18:00 UTC on September 20. However, decreasing sea surface temperatures caused Harvey to immediately weaken back to a tropical storm, while also losing tropical characteristics. At 18:00 UTC on September 21, Harvey transitioned into an extratropical cyclone while located well east of Newfoundland. Six hours later, the extratropical remnants of Harvey were absorbed into a frontal band.

=== Tropical Depression Ten ===
- Tropical depression (SSHWS)
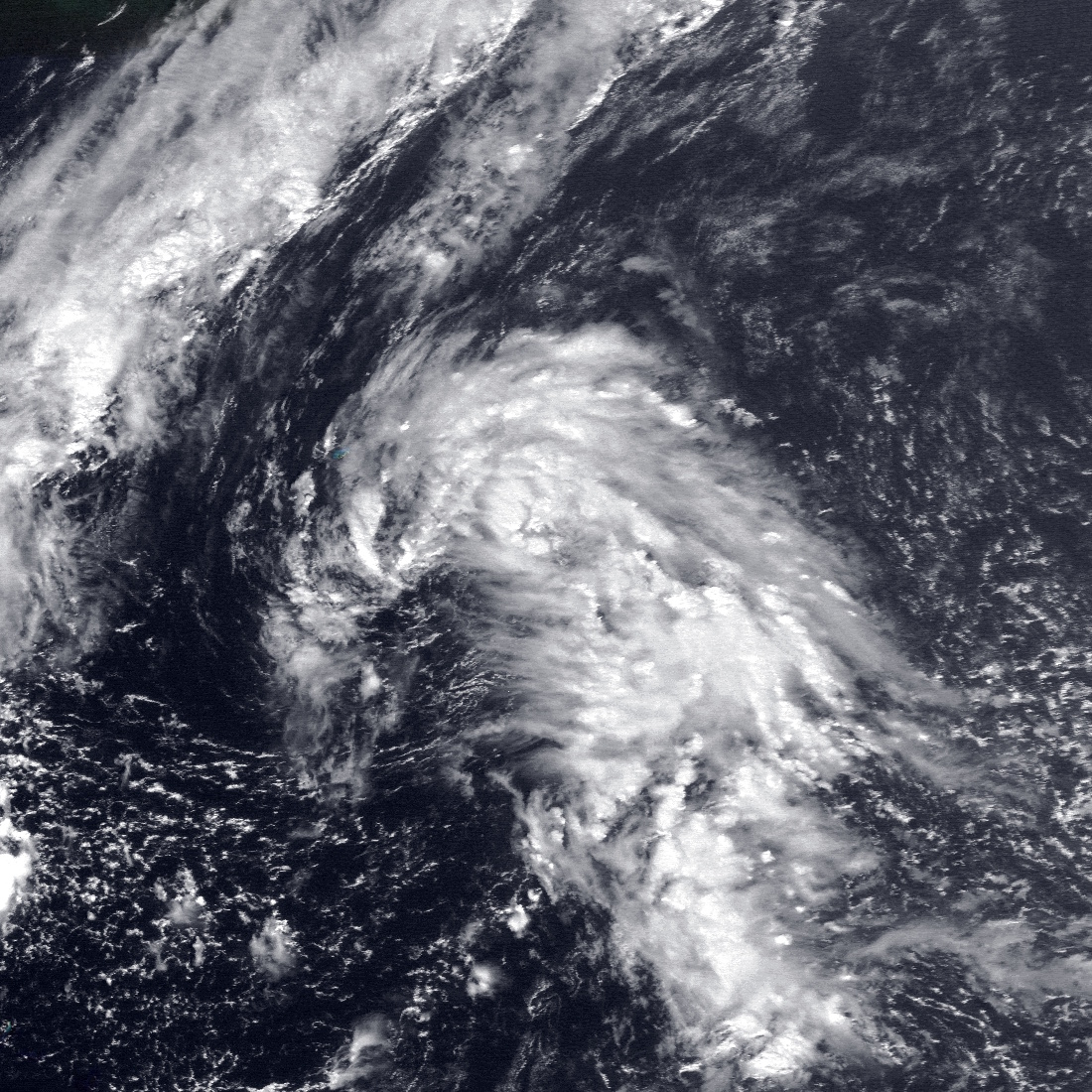
- Duration: September 29 – September 30
- Peak intensity: 35 mph (55 km/h) (1-min); 1008 mbar (hPa)

Tropical Depression Ten developed about 185 mi (298 km) southeast of Bermuda at 18:00 UTC on September 29. Initially, convection associated with the depression was confined to north and east of the center. The depression was difficult to track, though wind observations in Bermuda suggested that it passed just north of the island between 0300 and 07:00 UTC on September 30. Although no intensification was predicted, the National Hurricane Center noted that interaction with the approaching cold front could result in baroclinic strengthening. The depression did not organize further and merged with the cold front at 00:00 UTC on October 1.

== Storm names ==
The following list of names was used for named storms that formed in the North Atlantic in 1993. This was the same list used for the 1987 season as no names were retired from that year. No names were retired following the season, so the list was used again for the 1999 season.

- Arlene
- Bret
- Cindy
- Dennis
- Emily
- Floyd
- Gert
- Harvey
- Irene (unused)
- Jose (unused)
- Katrina (unused)
- Lenny (unused)
- Maria (unused)
- Nate (unused)
- Ophelia (unused)
- Philippe (unused)
- Rita (unused)
- Stan (unused)
- Tammy (unused)
- Vince (unused)
- Wilma (unused)

== Season effects ==
This is a table of all of the storms that formed in the 1993 Atlantic hurricane season. It includes their name, duration, peak classification and intensities, areas affected, damage, and death totals. Deaths in parentheses are additional and indirect (an example of an indirect death would be a traffic accident), but were still related to that storm. Damage and deaths include totals while the storm was extratropical, a wave, or a low, and all of the damage figures are in 1993 USD.

Saffir–Simpson scale
TD	TS	C1	C2	C3	C4	C5

1993 North Atlantic tropical cyclone season statistics
Storm name	Dates active	Storm category at peak intensity	Max 1-min wind mph (km/h)	Min. press. (mbar)	Areas affected	Damage (US$)	Deaths	Ref(s).
One	May 31 – June 2	Tropical depression	35 (55)	999	Cuba, Jamaica, Haiti, Florida, The Bahamas	Unknown	20	
Arlene	June 18 – 21	Tropical storm	40 (65)	1000	Guatemala, Mexico, Texas, Louisiana, Arkansas, Mississippi	$60.8 million	26	
Bret	August 4 –11	Tropical storm	60 (95)	1002	Trinidad and Tobago, Grenada, ABC islands, Venezuela, Colombia, Nicaragua	$37.5 million	213	
Cindy	August 14 – 17	Tropical storm	45 (75)	1007	Lesser Antilles, Puerto Rico, Dominican Republic	$19 million	4	
Dennis	August 23 –28	Tropical storm	50 (85)	1000	None	None	None	
Emily	August 22 – September 6	Category 3 hurricane	115 (185)	960	North Carolina, Virginia, Maryland, Delaware	$35 million	3	
Floyd	September 7 –10	Category 1 hurricane	75 (120)	990	Newfoundland	Unknown	None	
Gert	September 14 –21	Category 2 hurricane	100 (155)	970	Central America, Mexico	$170 million	116	
Harvey	September 18 –21	Category 1 hurricane	75 (120)	990	None	None	None	
Ten	September 29 –30	Tropical depression	35 (55)	1008	None	None	None	
Season aggregates
10 systems	May 31 – September 30		115 (185)	960		$322.3 million	382	

== See also ==
- Tropical cyclones in 1993
- 1993 Pacific hurricane season
- 1993 Pacific typhoon season
- 1993 North Indian Ocean cyclone season
- South-West Indian Ocean cyclone season: 1992–93, 1993–94
- Australian region cyclone season: 1992–93, 1993–94
- South Pacific cyclone season: 1992–93, 1993–94
- South Atlantic tropical cyclone
- Mediterranean tropical-like cyclone
