= Macuro =

- Location within Venezuela
- Coordinates: 10°39′N 61°56′W
- Country: Venezuela
- State: Sucre
- Municipality: Valdez

Government
  - Mayor: Jesús Ramírez (PSUV)

Area
  - Total: 598 km^{2} (231 sq mi)
- Elevation: 4 m (13 ft)

Population (2001)
  - Total: 33,621
  - Density: 56.2/km^{2} (146/sq mi)
- Time zone: UTC-4:30 (VST)
  - Summer (DST): UTC-4:30 (not observed)
- Area code: 0276
- Website: valdez-sucre.gob.ve
- The area and population figures are for the municipality

Macuro, a town in Venezuela, located a few miles from Bocas del Dragón, is a small fishing town overlooking a peaceful bay on the south-west side of the Paria peninsula, in Sucre state, Venezuela.

Macuro has the historical distinction of being the only part of the American continent visited by Christopher Columbus. During Columbus's third expedition, on August 1498, Columbus arrived to the Eastern Region, Venezuela and spent days interacting with the natives. He believed the area to be a large island at first, christening the region "Tierra de Gracia" or Land of Grace.

A small mission-town was formally established in 1738 under the name of San Carlos Barromeo de Macuro. The town numbered over 1,000 people who lived off the harvest of cocoa and cotton. Towards the end of the 19th century, the Venezuelan government decided to build a port to serve as an intermediate transfer point for cargo. In 1903, president Cipriano Castro inaugurated the Cristobal Colon port. Its deep waters were ideal for receiving large ships. The town became the capital of Cristobal Colon Federal Territory and enjoyed a considerable level of activity. However in 1935, president Juan Vicente Gómez ordered the port to be closed, and stopped all expansion activities. All the equipment and facilities were transferred to nearby Güiria.

Early in the 20th Century, when seaplanes started to become the main means of air travel, Pan Am used the bay of Macuro as the place where its passengers to Trinidad would disembark, due to the serenity of its waters; from there they would be taken by boat to the island a few miles away.

Macuro never had any terrestrial links, and all communications were by sea. This changed in the year 2000 when a small road connecting the town to Guiria, 65 kilometers away, was opened.

Today the population of Macuro is under 2,400 people. A cement company owns a gypsum extraction facility there; it is the major source of jobs. The other main economic activity is fishing. The lack of job opportunities causes many young men to leave the town, seeking employment elsewhere.

Luis Estaba is one of the famous people to be born in the Macuro area .

Because of its proximity to Trinidad and the presence of many small vessels engaged in narcotraffic and smuggling in the area, the National Guard permanently operates a small naval station with the purpose of patrolling the area.

Each year, a large number of sea turtles lay their eggs in the beaches of Macuro.
