= Adrian (disambiguation) =

Adrian is a masculine given name, with some female usage.

Adrian may also refer to:

== Places ==
=== Romania ===
- Adrian, a village in Livada town, Satu Mare County
- Adrian, a village in Gurghiu Commune, Mureș County

=== United States ===
- Adrian, Georgia, a city
- Adrian, Illinois, an unincorporated community
- Adrian Township, Jackson County, Kansas
- Adrian, Michigan, the county seat of Lenawee County
- Adrian Charter Township, Michigan
- Adrian, Minnesota, a city
- Adrian Township, Watonwan County, Minnesota
- Adrian, Missouri, a city
- Adrian Township, LaMoure County, North Dakota
- Adrian, New York, a hamlet
- Adrian, Ohio, an unincorporated community
- Adrian, Oregon, a city
- Adrian, Pennsylvania, an unincorporated community
- Adrian Township, Edmunds County, South Dakota
- Adrian, Texas, a city
- Adrian, U.S. Virgin Islands, a settlement
- Adrian, Grant County, Washington, a community
- Adrian, West Virginia, an unincorporated community
- Adrian, Wisconsin, a town

== People ==
- Adrian (surname)
- Adrian (costume designer), Hollywood costume designer Adrian Greenburg (1903–1959)
- Adrián (footballer), Spanish footballer Adrián San Miguel del Castillo (born 1987)
- Adrian (gamer), American professional League of Legends player

== Arts and entertainment ==
- Adrian (TV series), an Italian animated series
  - Adrian (album), album by Adriano Celentano, 2019
- Adrian (Buzy album), an album by Buzy (singer), 1983
- Tau Ceti e, an exoplanet candidate fictionalized as the planet "Adrian", a fictional planet in the real star system of Tau Ceti, a planet from the novel and film Project Hail Mary

== Schools in the United States ==
- Adrian College, Adrian, Michigan
- Adrian High School (disambiguation), various high schools

== Other uses ==
- Hurricane Adrian (disambiguation), several Pacific hurricanes
- Baron Adrian, an extinct title in the Peerage of the United Kingdom
- Adrian helmet, a combat helmet used by France in World Wars I and II

== See also ==
- Ardian (disambiguation)
- Adrien (disambiguation)
- Adrienne (disambiguation)
- Adriano (disambiguation)
