= Adrain =

Adrain is a name of Scottish and English origin, an altered form of Adrian, and may refer to:

- Garnett Adrain (1815–1878), American politician
- Robert Adrain (1775–1843), scientist and mathematician

== See also ==
- Adran (disambiguation)
- Audrain (disambiguation)
- Adrian (disambiguation)
