= Adrien (disambiguation) =

Adrien is a given name and surname.

Adrien may also refer to:

- Adrien (1943 film), a French film
- Adrien (2015 film), a Canadian film
- Adrien (opera), a 1799 opera by Méhul
- Adrien (dancer), French dancer and choreographer Julien-Adrien Renoux (1816–1870)
- Adrien Joyce, a stage name of Carole Eastman (1934–2004), American actress and screenwriter

== See also ==
- Adrian (disambiguation)
- Adrienne (disambiguation)
