= Ardian (given name) =

- Gender: Male
- Language: Illyrian

Origin
- Meaning: from the Illyrian tribe of Ardiaei

Other names
- See also: Ardjan, Ardiana

Ardian is an Albanian name. Although similar to Adrian, a name of Latin origin, the Albanian name Ardian (Ardjan and Ardijan being other variants) is a derivation of Ardiaei, the name of an ancient Illyrian people. Their original inland residence was along the Naro River (modern river Neretva, also known as Narenta in ancient times) up to the Konjic region, in present-day Bosnia and Herzegovina.

Ardiana is a feminine form of this name. Abbreviated forms like Ardi and Ardia are in use too.

== List of people ==
Notable people with the name include:

- Ardian Behari (born 1973), Albanian footballer and coach
- Ardian Berisha (born 1998), Swedish footballer
- Ardian Bujupi (born 1991), Albanian singer and songwriter
- Ardian Cuculi (born 1987), ethnic Albanian footballer from Macedonia
- Ardian Đokaj (born 1979), Montenegrin footballer
- Ardian Fullani (born 1955), former governor of the Bank of Albania
- Ardian Gashi (born 1981), Kosovar-Norwegian footballer
- Ardian Gjini (born 1970), Kosovan politician
- Ardian Gjokaj (born 1979), ethnic Albanian footballer from Montenegro
- Ardian Ismajli (born 1996), Kosovan football player
- Ardian Klosi (1957–2012), Albanian publicist, albanologist, writer, translator and social activist
- Adrian Kollozi (fl. 2009–2011), Albanian politician
- Ardian Kozniku (born 1967), ethnic Albanian footballer from Kosovo
- Ardian Limani (born 1993), Kosovar professional footballer
- Ardian Mema (born 1971), Albanian footballer
- Ardian Nuhiu (born 1978), Albanian association footballer
- Ardian Pepa (born 1977), Albanian sculptor and painter
- Ardian Popa (born 1962), Albanian footballer
- Ardian Rexhepi (born 1993), ethnic Albanian footballer from Sweden
- Ardian Syaf, Indonesia comic book artist
- Ardian Turku, Albanian politician, member of the Parliament of Albania, and former mayor of Elbasan
- Ardian Vehbiu (born 1959), Albanian author and translator
- Ardian Zika (born 1980), American politician

• Ardian Xhemaili (born 2001) Albanian ultra nationalist
