= Audrain =

Audrain may refer to:

- Ashley Audrain (born 1982), Canadian author
- François Audrain, French singer and songwriter
- James Hunter Audrain (1781–1831), colonel of militia in War of 1812 and member of Missouri state legislature
- Audrain County, Missouri, county in Missouri, United States
- USS Audrain (APA-59), United States Navy Gilliam class attack transport that served during World War II

== See also ==
- Adrain
- Adrian (disambiguation)
