= List of storms named Adrian =

The name Adrian has been used for eight tropical cyclones in the Eastern Pacific Ocean.

- Tropical Storm Adrian (1981), remained off the coast of Mexico
- Tropical Storm Adrian (1987), looped off the coast of Mexico
- Hurricane Adrian (1993), a Category 1 hurricane, remained well out to sea
- Hurricane Adrian (1999), a Category 2 hurricane, remained off the coast of Mexico
- Hurricane Adrian (2005), a Category 1 hurricane that made landfall in Central America
- Hurricane Adrian (2011), a strong Category 4 hurricane that passed to the south of the coast of Mexico
- Tropical Storm Adrian (2017), formed southeast of the Gulf of Tehuantepec and remained offshore
- Hurricane Adrian (2023), a Category 2 hurricane that remained in the open ocean
