= Adran =

Adran may refer to:

- Adran Premier, the top division of women's football in Wales
- Queen Adran, a fictional character

== See also ==
- Adaran (disambiguation), places in Iran
