= 1993 Pacific hurricane season =

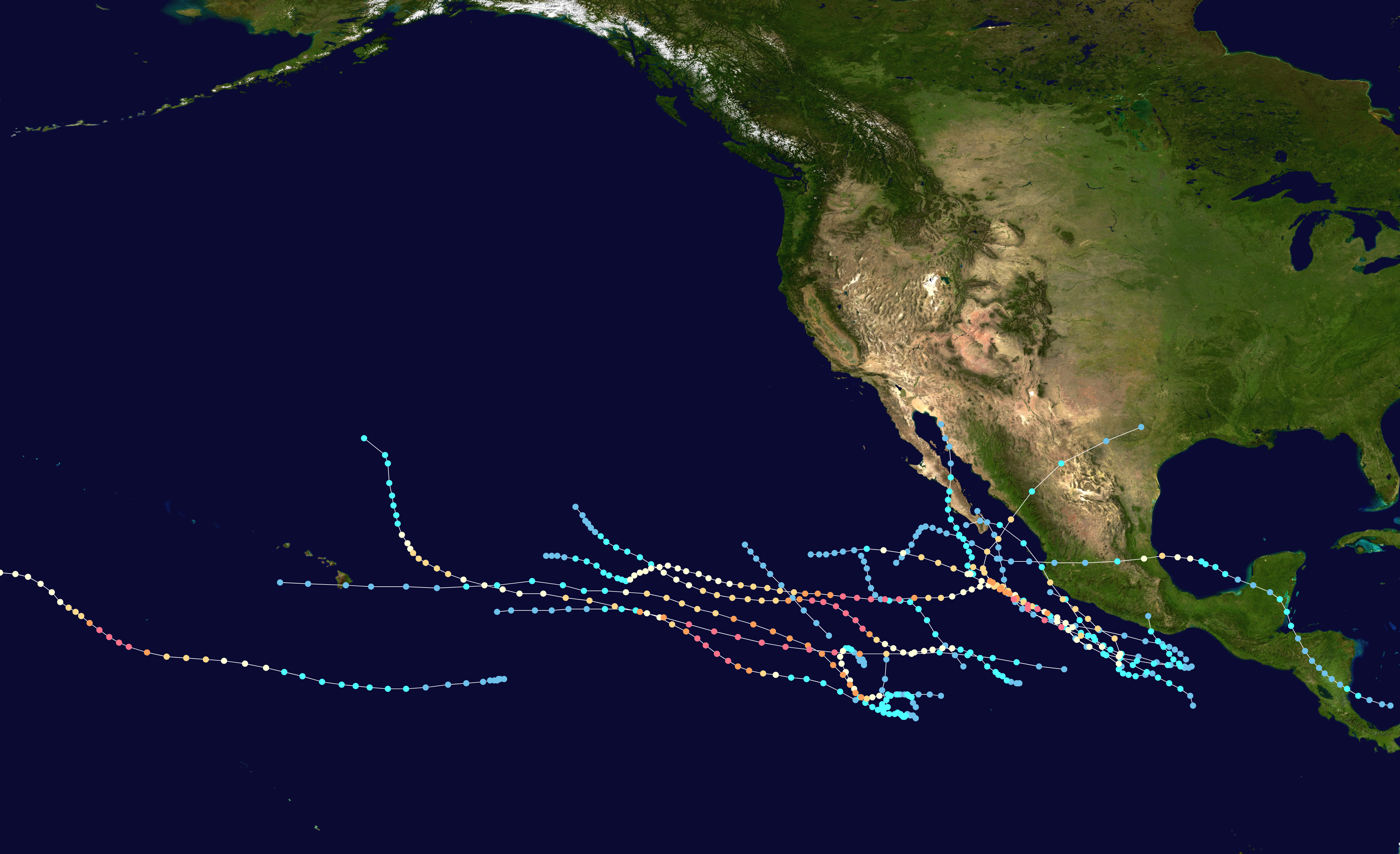
- Season summary map

Seasonal boundaries
- First system formed: June 11, 1993
- Last system dissipated: October 14, 1993

Strongest storm
- Name: Lidia
  - Maximum winds: 150 mph (240 km/h) (1-minute sustained)
  - Lowest pressure: 930 mbar (hPa; 27.46 inHg)

Seasonal statistics
- Total depressions: 18
- Total storms: 15
- Hurricanes: 11
- Major hurricanes (Cat. 3+): 9
- Total fatalities: 51 total
- Total damage: $45 million (1993 USD)

Related articles
- Timeline of the 1993 Pacific hurricane season; 1993 Atlantic hurricane season; 1993 Pacific typhoon season; 1993 North Indian Ocean cyclone season

The 1993 Pacific hurricane season included more than double the average number of major hurricanes – Category 3 or stronger cyclones on the Saffir–Simpson scale. This activity was the result of an El Niño event, which is the main factor contributing to above-average activity across the Pacific basin. The season featured 15 named storms, 11 hurricanes, and 9 major hurricanes. While the number of named storms was near the long-term average, the number of hurricanes was above the average of 8, and the number of major hurricanes far exceeded the long-term average of 4. Seasonal activity began on May 17 and ended on November 8, within the confines of a traditional hurricane season which begins on May 15 in the East Pacific and June 1 in the Central Pacific. The season ends on November 30 in both basins. These dates conventionally delimit the period during each year when most tropical cyclones form.

A majority of the season's storms formed from tropical waves between 10°N and southern coast of Mexico. While they generally followed the typical path away from Mexico before dissipating over cooler waters near 25°N, a persistent upper-level trough across the Western United States periodically curved storms into land. Tropical Storm Beatriz produced heavy rainfall and downed trees across Southern Mexico, causing 6 fatalities. In July, Hurricane Calvin struck Southwestern Mexico, prompting the evacuation of 42,000 residents, the displacement of 1,600 people, and 37 deaths. This area was later affected by Hurricane Jova in September, which flooded houses. Hurricanes Dora, Eugene, and Fernanda produced generally minor rainfall across the Hawaiian Islands, alleviating drought conditions. However, their large swells caused damage to beachfront homes and caused the death of a fisherman offshore. Hurricane Hilary produced heavy rainfall across portions of Mexico and California in August. The next month, Hurricane Lidia destroyed hundreds of homes, displaced over 10,000 people, and resulted in 7 deaths.

== Storms ==
=== Hurricane Adrian ===
- Category 1 hurricane (SSHWS)
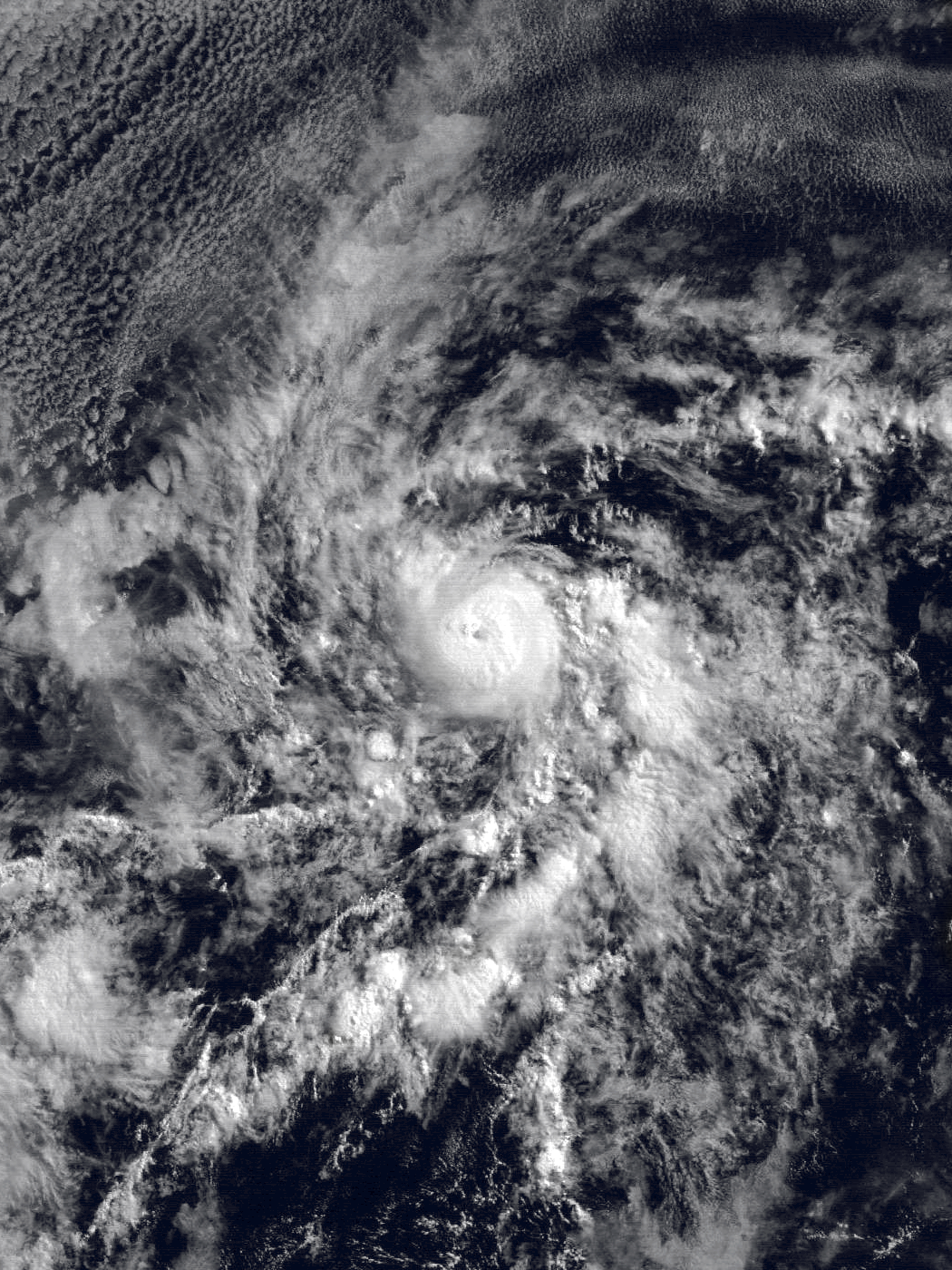
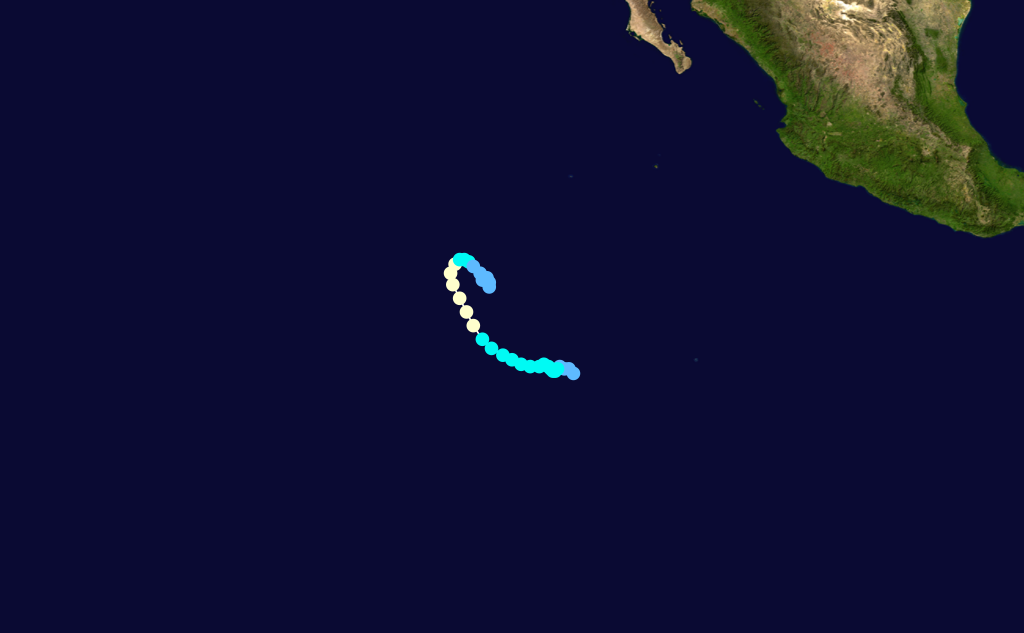
- Duration: June 11 – June 19
- Peak intensity: 85 mph (140 km/h) (1-min); 979 mbar (hPa)

A low-pressure area and associated convection developed within the Intertropical Convergence Zone as early as June 9. Additionally, a tropical wave from Africa is estimated to have entered the East Pacific basin around this time. The combination of disturbances led to the formation of a tropical depression on June 11. Embedded within weak steering flow, the depression initially drifted towards the west and began to organize amid warm sea surface temperatures and low wind shear. Eighteen hours after formation, the depression strengthened into Tropical Storm Adrian. Turning towards the northwest, Adrian gradually strengthened to attain hurricane status by 12:00 UTC on June 15. The storm reached a peak intensity of 85 mph (137 km/h) early the next day. It veered toward the southeast, encountering stronger wind shear which began to take toll on the cyclone. The system became nearly stationary and dissipated at 1800 UTC on June 19 without any effects to land.

=== Tropical Storm Beatriz ===
- Tropical storm (SSHWS)
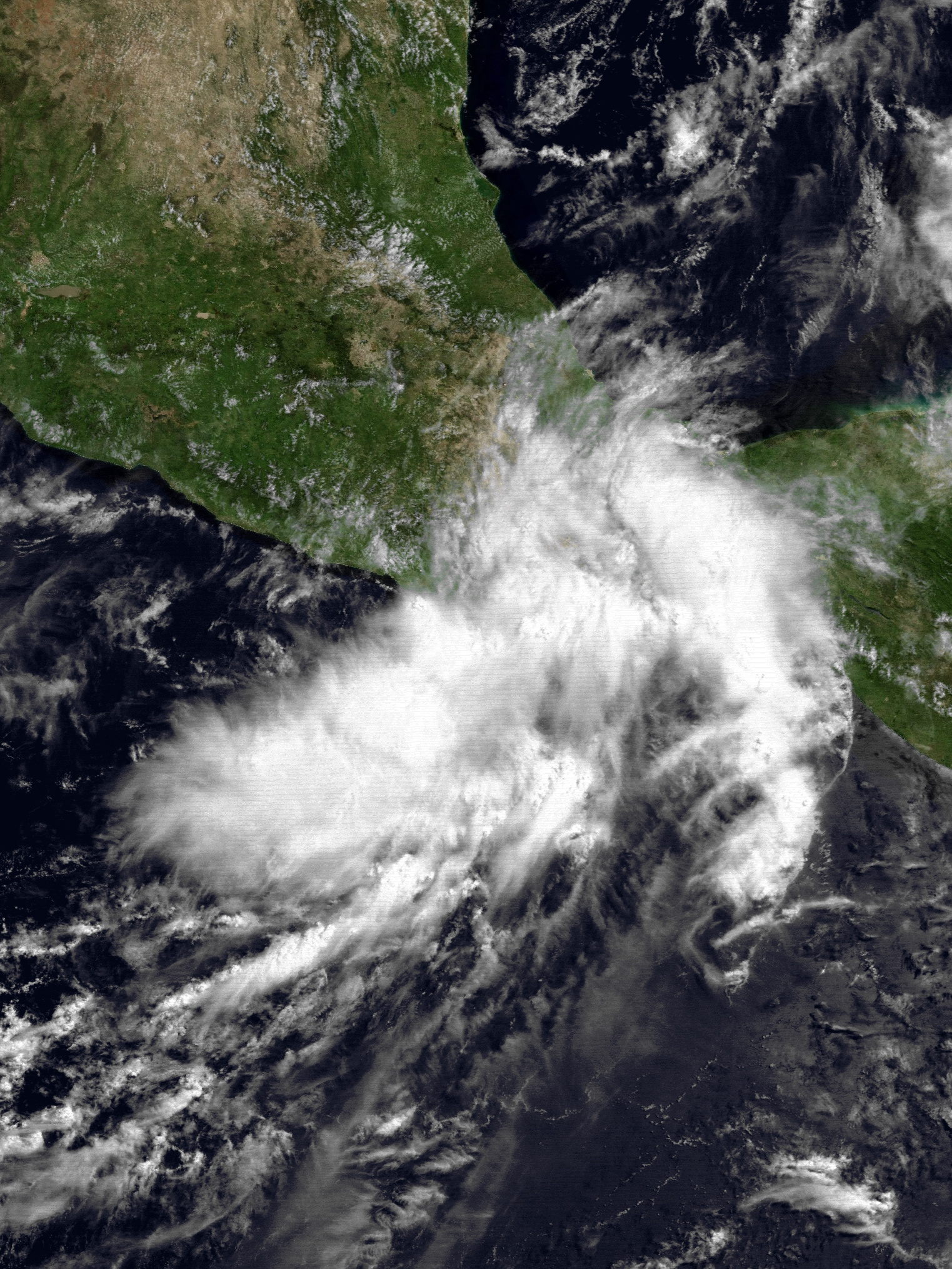
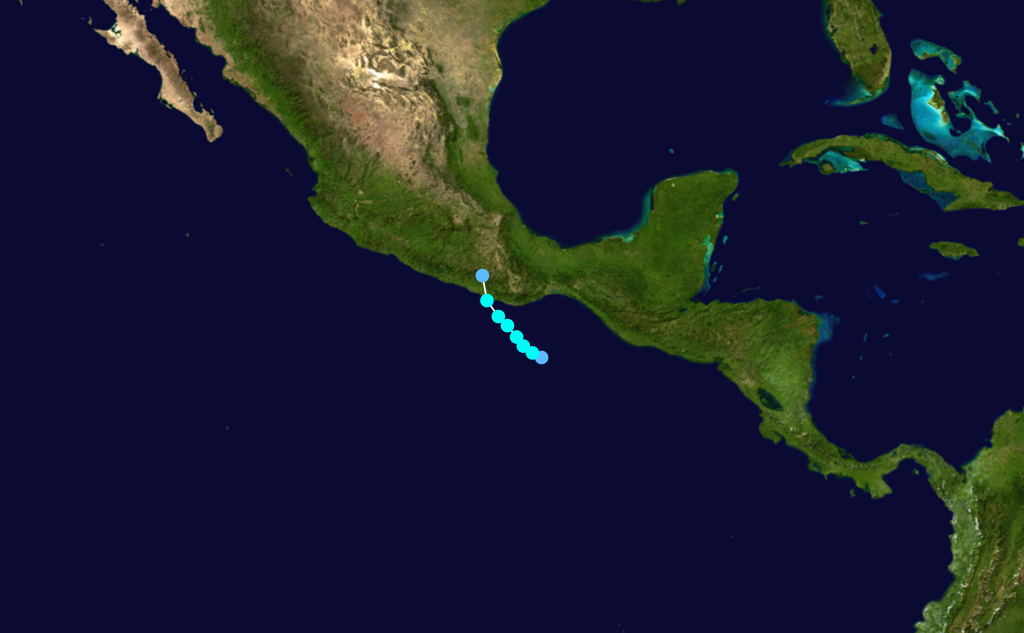
- Duration: June 18 – June 20
- Peak intensity: 65 mph (100 km/h) (1-min); 995 mbar (hPa)

On June 14, satellite imagery revealed an increase in thunderstorm activity to the south of the Gulf of Tehuantepec, which may have been aided by the passage of a tropical wave. Moving little, a broad surface low developed with the cloud mass. Although the disturbance remained disorganized, a second tropical wave moved into the region on June 18, when the cloudiness there became better concentrated. A tropical depression formed at 06:00 UTC on June 18 while located approximately 150 mi (240 km) south-southeast of Huatulco, Oaxaca. Quickly strengthening, the depression intensified into Tropical Storm Beatriz six hours later.

Moving generally towards the northwest, partially due to Tropical Storm Arlene's large circulation in the Gulf of Mexico, Beatriz reached a peak intensity of 65 mph (105 km/h) by 18:00 UTC on June 19. Shortly thereafter, the system made landfall near Puerto Escondido, Oaxaca, and rapidly weakened to a tropical depression over the mountainous terrain of Mexico. Beatriz dissipated at 06:00 UTC on June 20, although the remnant cloudiness and associated convection from the storm spread across portions of the western Gulf of Mexico that same day. Beatriz caused extensive damage in southwest Mexico, especially from heavy rains and flooding. Accumulations generally varied between 5–10 in (0.13–0.25 m) across Oaxaca, with higher totals of 11.97 and 15.46 in (304 and 393 mm) in Las Pilas and Salina Cruz, respectively. Six deaths were reported in the Mexican states of Morelos and Veracruz from flooding and downed trees attributed to Beatriz.

=== Tropical Depression Three-E ===
- Tropical depression (SSHWS)
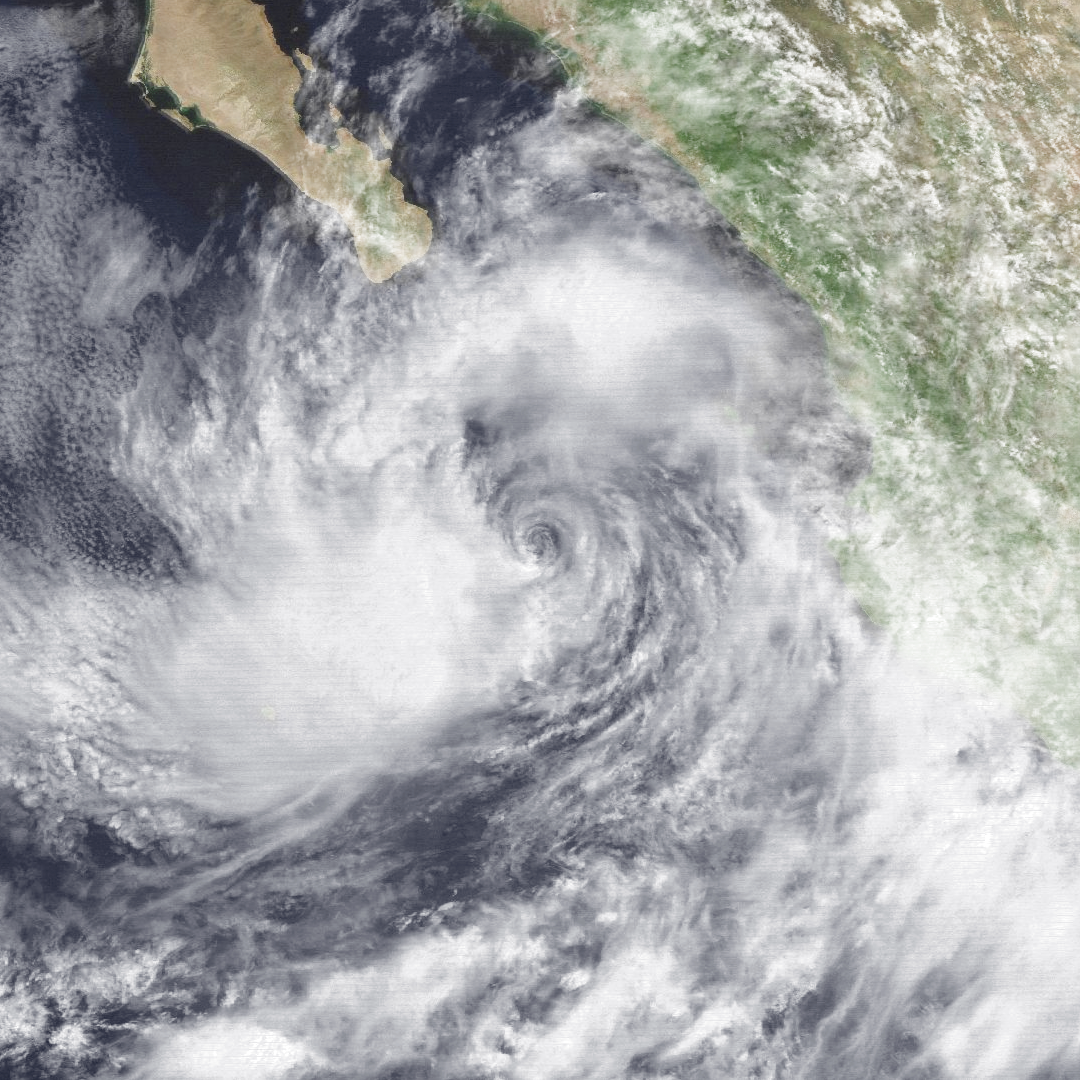
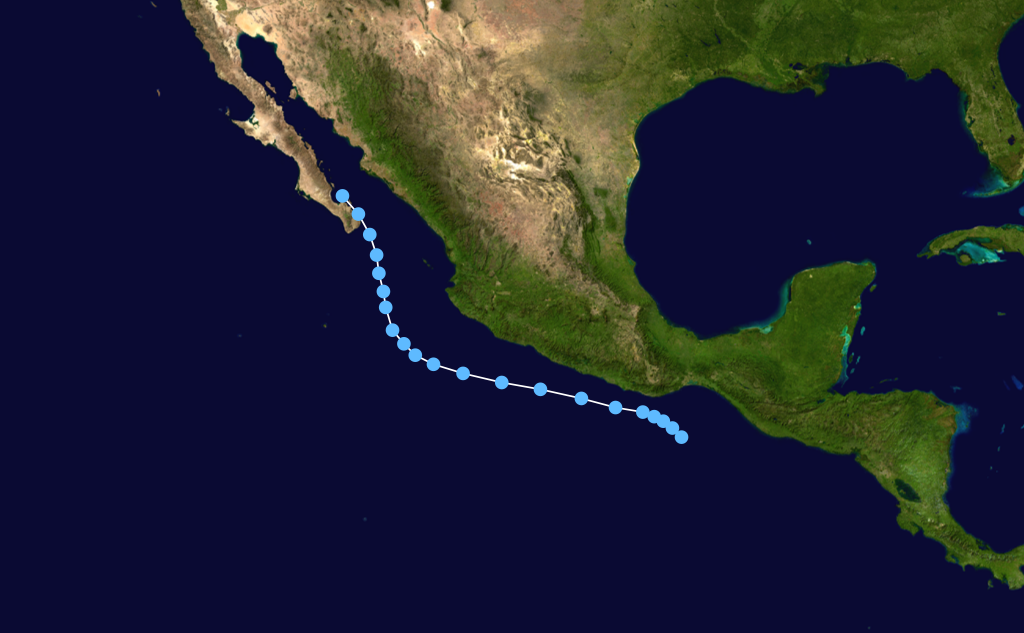
- Duration: June 27 – July 2
- Peak intensity: 35 mph (55 km/h) (1-min); 1006 mbar (hPa)

A large area of disturbed weather persisted south of Mexico for several days, perhaps enhanced by a westward-moving tropical wave that departed Africa on June 12. The disturbance organized into a tropical depression around 00:00 UTC on June 27 while located about 115 mi (185 km) south of the Gulf of Tehuantepec. The newly designated cyclone moved generally toward the northwest, passing about 60 mi (97 km) offshore Mexico near Puerto Escondido on its closest approach. Although the depression developed a symmetrical area of convection on June 30, it soon passed over cooler ocean waters and began to become disheveled. The system dissipated a short distance north of La Paz, Baja California Sur, around 00:00 UTC on July 2.

The precursor disturbance to Three-E produced heavy rainfall along coastal sections of Mexico, peaking at 8.80 in (224 mm) in Santa María Jacatepec, Oaxaca. As the designated system paralleled Mexico, it contributed to multiple days of rainfall, including in Acapulco, Guerrero where 11.89 in (302 mm) fell between June 26–29. Satellite rainfall estimates exceeded 20 in (510 mm) on June 28. No deaths or damage were reported, but some 300 families were evacuated in an unspecified area of the country.

=== Hurricane Calvin ===
- Category 2 hurricane (SSHWS)
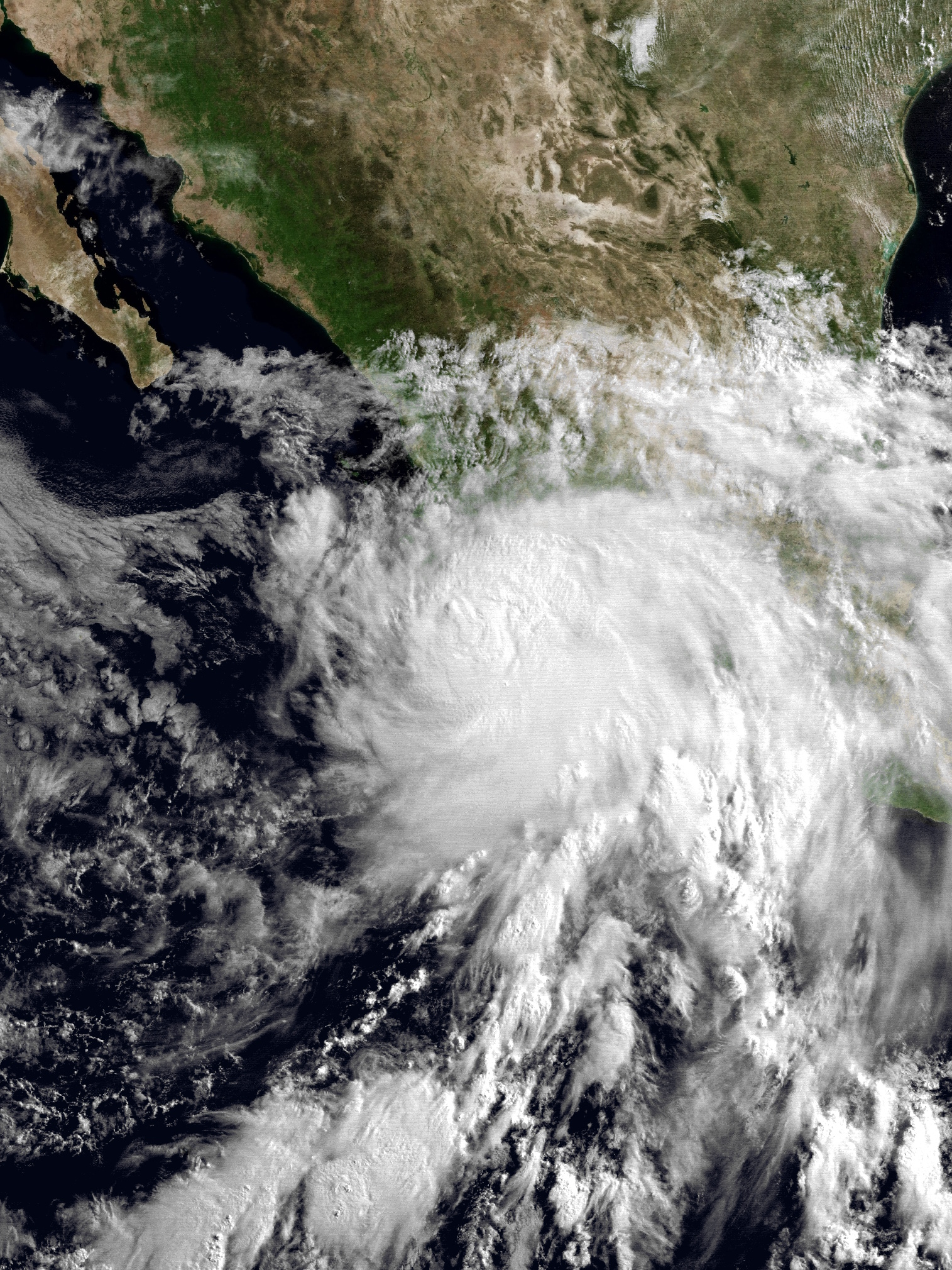
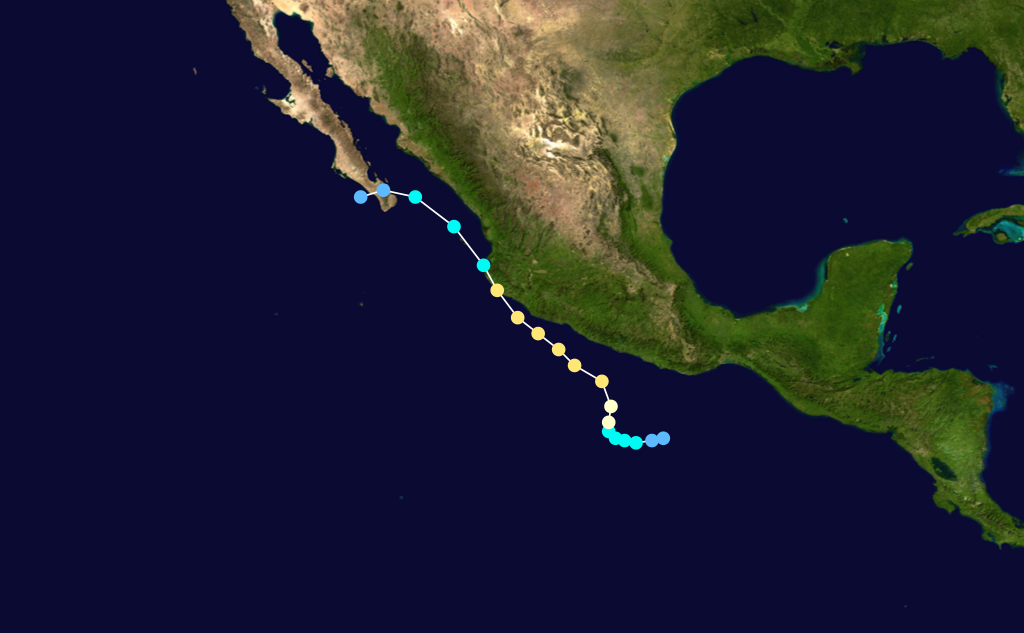
- Duration: July 4 – July 9
- Peak intensity: 110 mph (175 km/h) (1-min); 966 mbar (hPa)

Hurricane Calvin was first identified as an area of disturbed weather south of the Gulf of Tehuantepec on July 2. Following the development of banding features, the disturbance organized into a tropical depression around 12:00 UTC on July 2 while situated 315 mi (505 km) southeast of Acapulco. The depression intensified into Tropical Storm Calvin twelve hours later. After initially tracking westward, Calvin turned north and attained hurricane status before reinstating a westward component. Situated just off the coast of Mexico, Calvin attained its peak intensity with winds of 110 mph (180 km/h) on July 7 but weakened slightly before moving onshore about 45 mi (72 km) west-northwest of Manzanillo, Colima, only the second July hurricane to make landfall on record at the time. The hurricane rapidly weakened and emerged back offshore in a much weakened state. Now a tropical depression, Calvin made its final landfall just south of La Paz before dissipating over cold waters in the region.

Following Calvin's closest approach, a weather station in Manzanillo recorded a wind gust of 84 mph (135 km/h); tropical storm-force winds were recorded in a few other locations. Several ships reported rough weather during Calvin's existence, with the Pacific Sandpiper reporting a maximum wave height of 44 ft (13 m) and winds of 98 mph (158 km/h). In Acapulco, waves in excess of 15 ft (4.6 m) affected the city. In several states, heavy rainfall between 5–10 in (130–250 mm) was recorded, with a maximum accumulation of 16.34 in (415 mm) observed in Las Pilas. A state of emergency was declared in at least ten states in Mexico following Calvin's passage, and the Mexican Defense Department said that 42,063 people were evacuated in 11 states. Additionally, at least 1,600 people were left homeless. Rough seas near Lázaro Cárdenas caused all 4,000 t (4,000,000 kg) of sulfuric acid to leak aboard the previously beached cargo tanker, Betula. Calvin was responsible for $32 million in damage. It killed 37 people, of which most deaths were the result of heavy rainfall.

=== Hurricane Dora ===
- Category 4 hurricane (SSHWS)
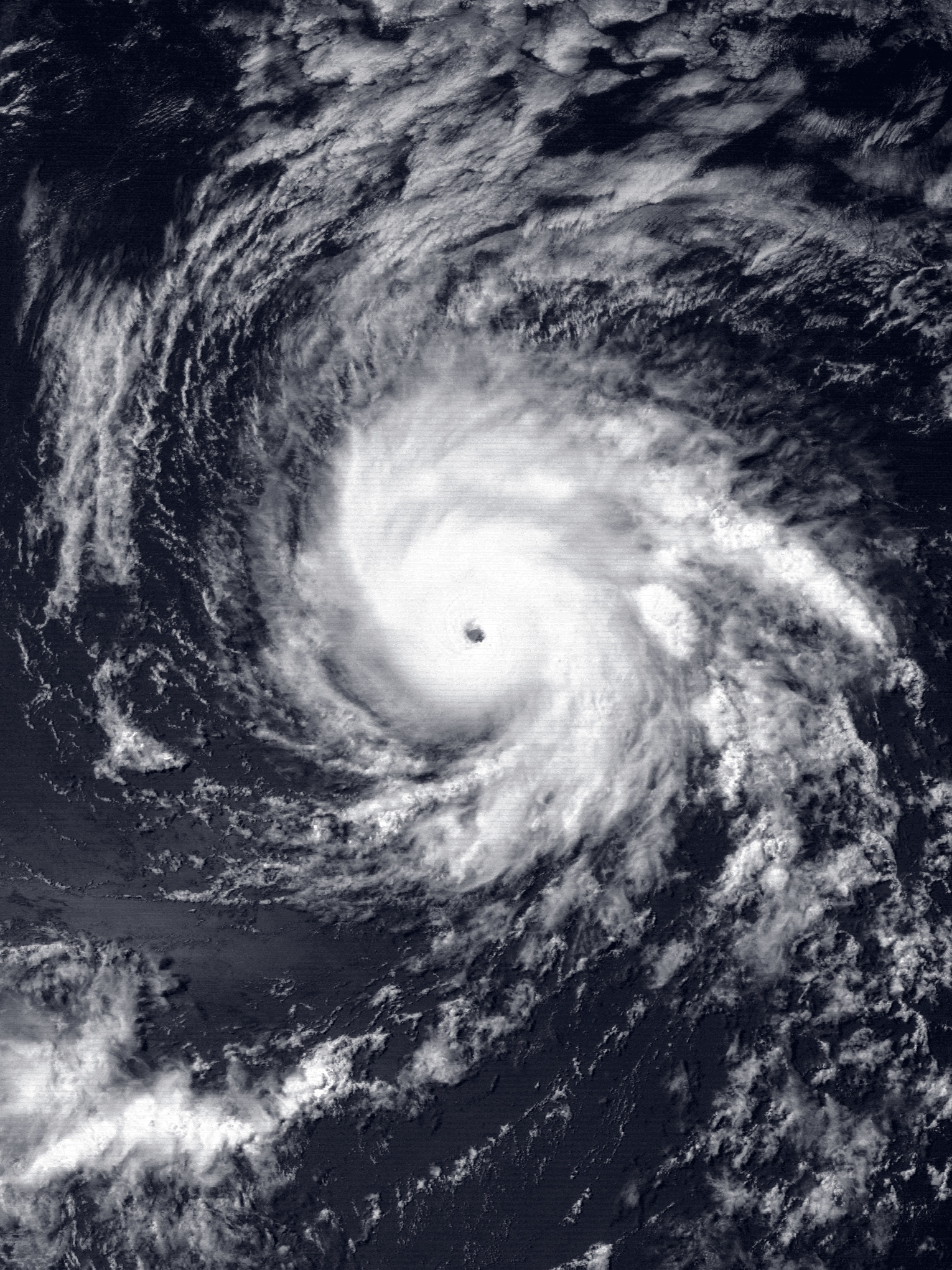
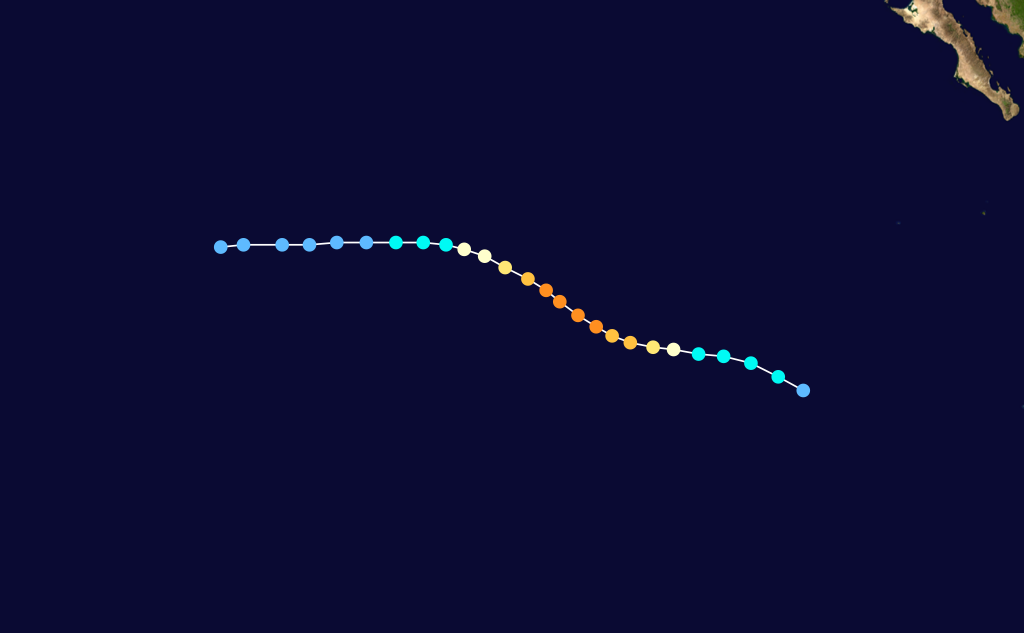
- Duration: July 14 – July 20
- Peak intensity: 130 mph (215 km/h) (1-min); 945 mbar (hPa)

A tropical wave departed Africa on June 27 and reached the East Pacific on June 9. It began to show signs of organization and developed into a tropical depression at 12:00 UTC on July 14. The system followed a west to west-northwest course for much of its duration under the influence of a subtropical ridge. It intensified into Tropical Storm Dora at 18:00 UTC and further strengthened into a hurricane 30 hours later. Dora intensified rapidly thereafter, with its winds increasing from 80 mph (130 km/h) to a peak of 130 mph (215 km/h) – equivalent to Category 4 intensity – during a 24-hour period ending at 18:00 UTC on July 16. After maintaining that strength for 18 hours, the cyclone encountered an upper-level trough to its west, which caused an abrupt uptick in wind shear while Dora simultaneously moved over colder waters. It gradually weakened and dissipated about 575 mi (925 km) east of the Hawaiian Islands at 00:00 UTC on July 21. The remnants of Dora interacted with a cold-core low near those islands, causing an outbreak of thunderstorms that alleviated ongoing drought conditions there.

=== Hurricane Eugene ===
- Category 3 hurricane (SSHWS)
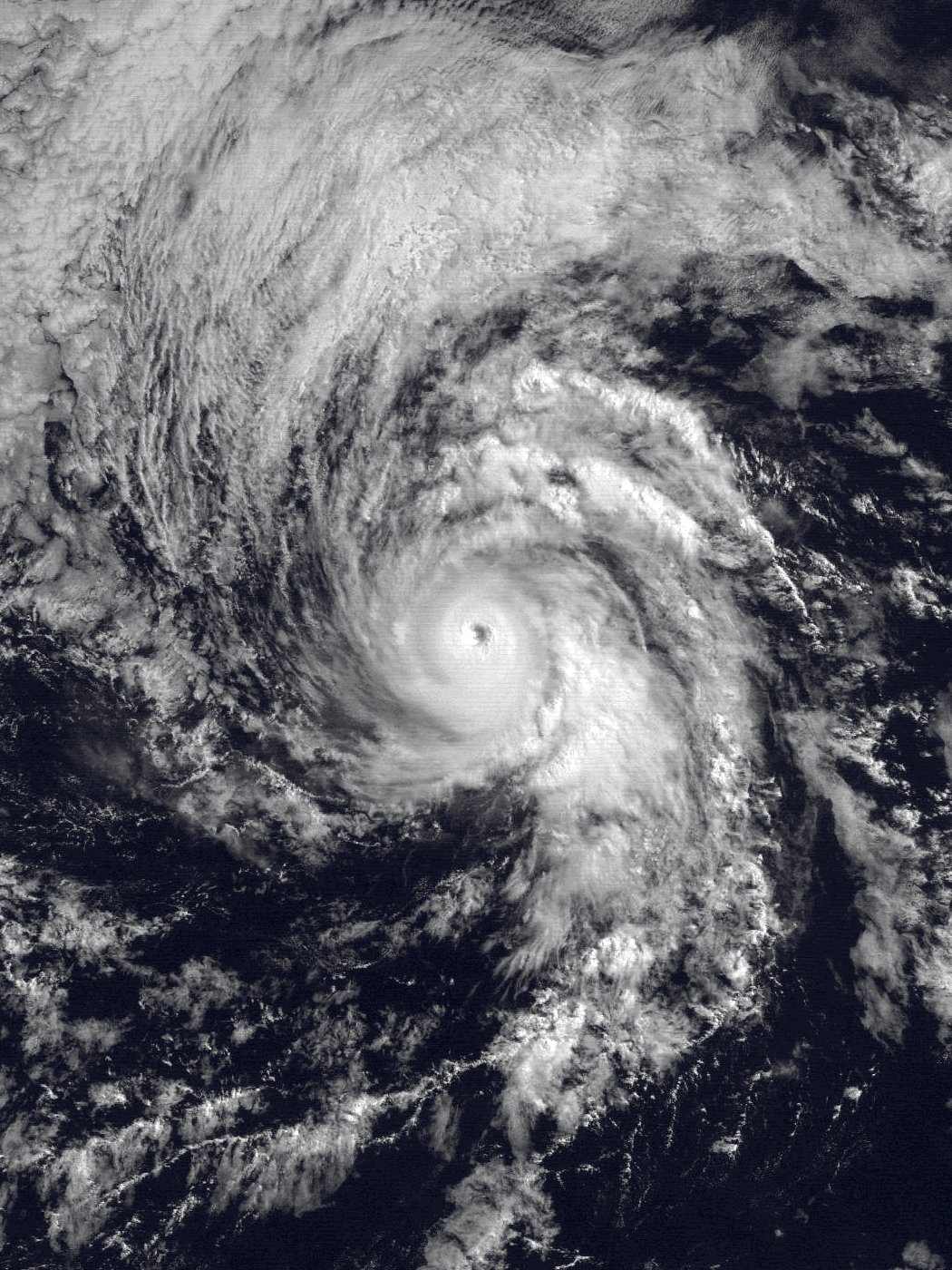
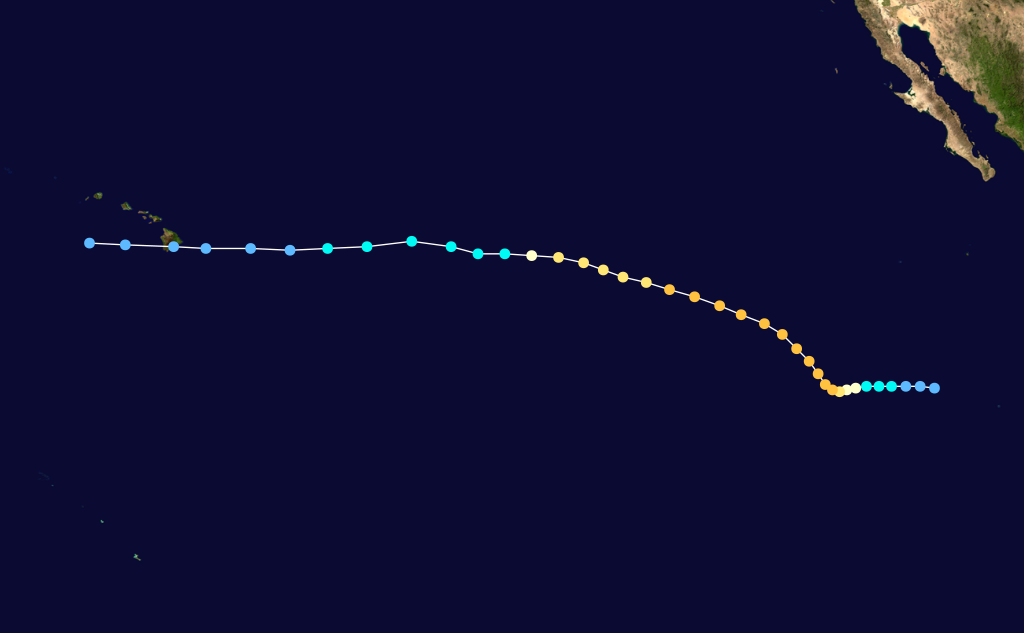
- Duration: July 15 – July 25
- Peak intensity: 125 mph (205 km/h) (1-min); 948 mbar (hPa)

Tropical Depression Six-E developed south-southwest of the Baja California Peninsula at 18:00 UTC on July 15. Its genesis may have been related to a tropical wave that departed Africa on June 30 and reached the vicinity of the cyclone that day. After banding features improved, the depression was upgraded to Tropical Storm Eugene at 12:00 UTC on July 16. Eugene alternated on a west to northwest course for several days and gradually intensified, becoming a hurricane around 06:00 UTC on July 17 and a major hurricane by 00:00 UTC on July 18. The system peaked with winds of 125 mph (201 km/h) the next day, when it displayed a well-defined eye pattern on satellite. As the system peaked, it abruptly slowed and turned to the northwest under the influence of a cold-core low.

After peak intensity, Eugene began to weaken due to increasing wind shear and cooler ocean waters. It entered the Central Pacific on July 22 and continued to lose organization on satellite, making a later landfall on the southern side of the Big Island at 12:00 UTC on July 24 as a tropical depression. Across the Hawaiian Islands, the system produced beneficial rainfall and no major damage, though broken tree limbs and minor power outages were reported. A 45-year-old fisherman may have drowned when his 24 ft (7.3 m) boat was smashed in the storm's rough seas. Eugene continued rapidly westward past Hawaii and dissipated on July 25.

=== Hurricane Keoni ===
- Category 4 hurricane (SSHWS)
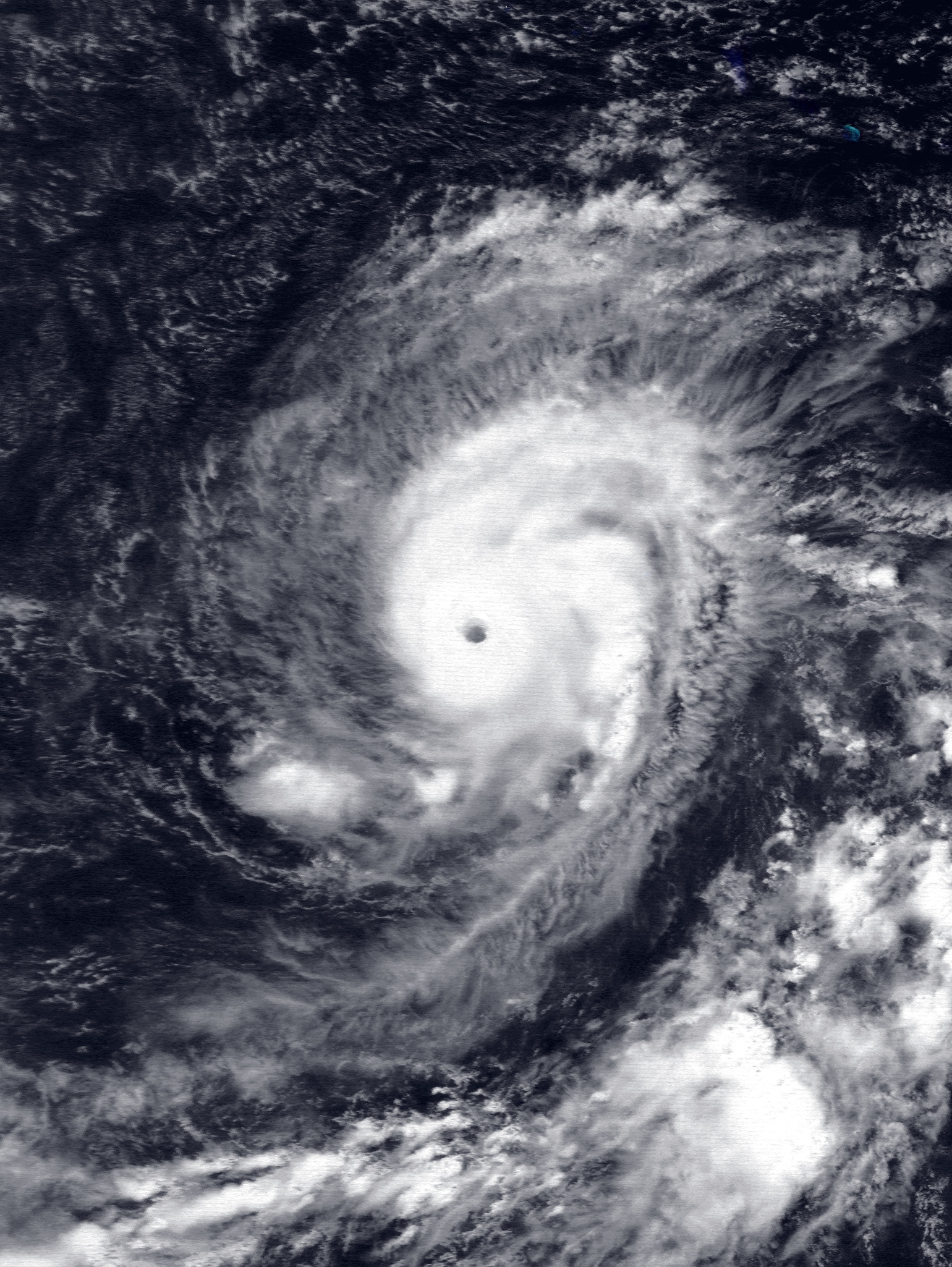
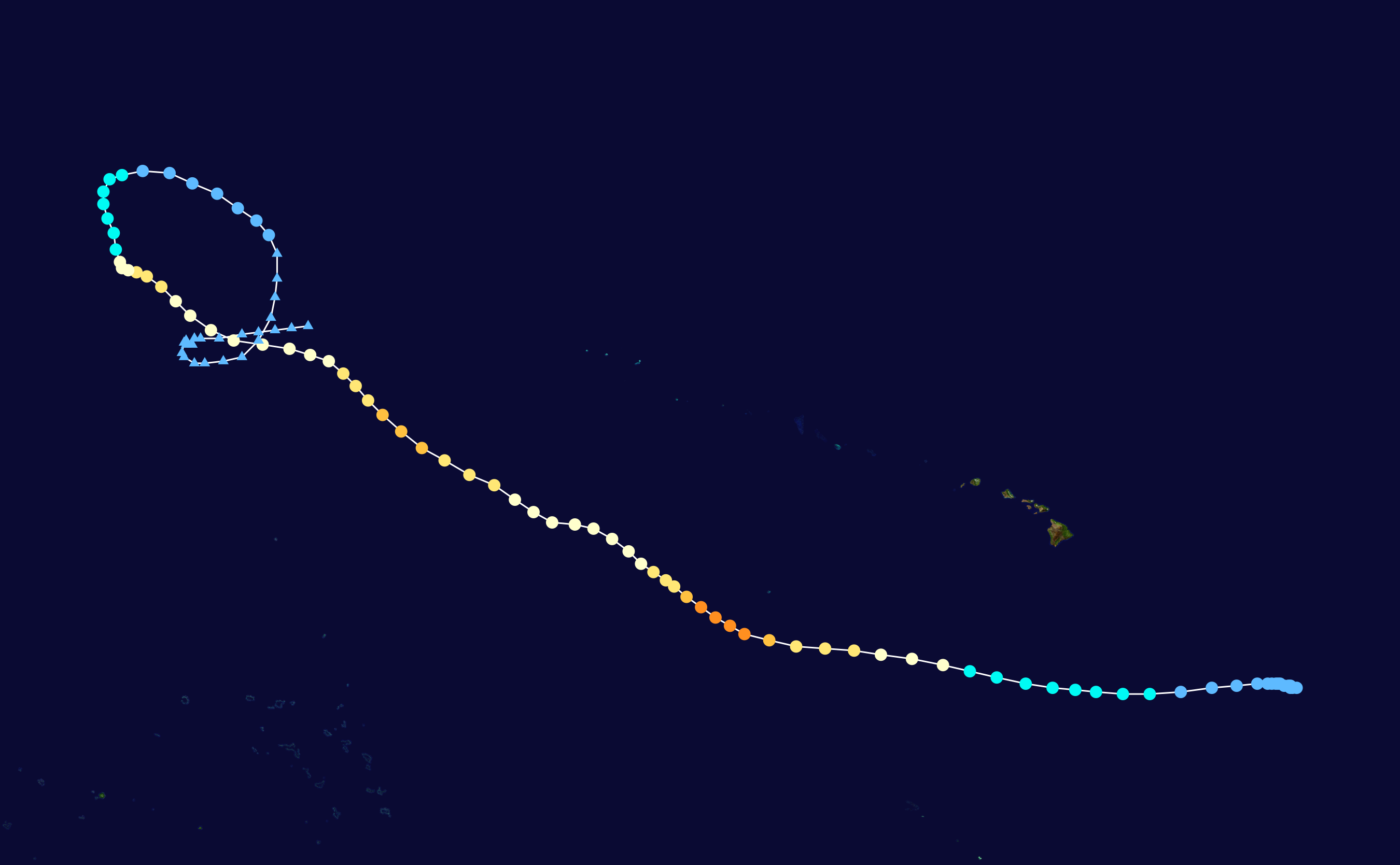
- Duration: August 9 – August 19 (Exited basin)
- Peak intensity: 130 mph (215 km/h) (1-min); 942 mbar (hPa)

An area of disturbed weather developed into Tropical Depression One-C at 00:00 UTC on August 9. The depression remained steady state until 18:00 UTC on August 12, at which time it intensified into Tropical Storm Keoni. The cyclone moved west-northwest and continued to gain organization, becoming a hurricane around 18:00 UTC on August 14 and a major hurricane by 06:00 UTC on August 16. Six hours later, Keoni became a powerful Category 4 hurricane with winds of 130 mph (210 km/h). It passed about 150 mi (240 km) south of Johnston Atoll on August 18, where 1,000 people had been evacuated in advance of the storm. On account of Keoni's small stature, the island only experienced gusts up to 45 mph (70 km/h) and rough surf along its southeastern shoreline. The hurricane continued west-northwest, and although it had weakened substantially, it crossed the International Date Line around 18:00 UTC on August 19, when it was reclassified as a typhoon. In the West Pacific, the system alternated between Category 1–3 intensity for a while. It executed clockwise loops along the northern fringes of Typhoon Vernon before losing its status as a tropical cyclone on August 28. The remnant circulation continued to persist north of Wake Island into early September.

=== Hurricane Fernanda ===
- Category 4 hurricane (SSHWS)
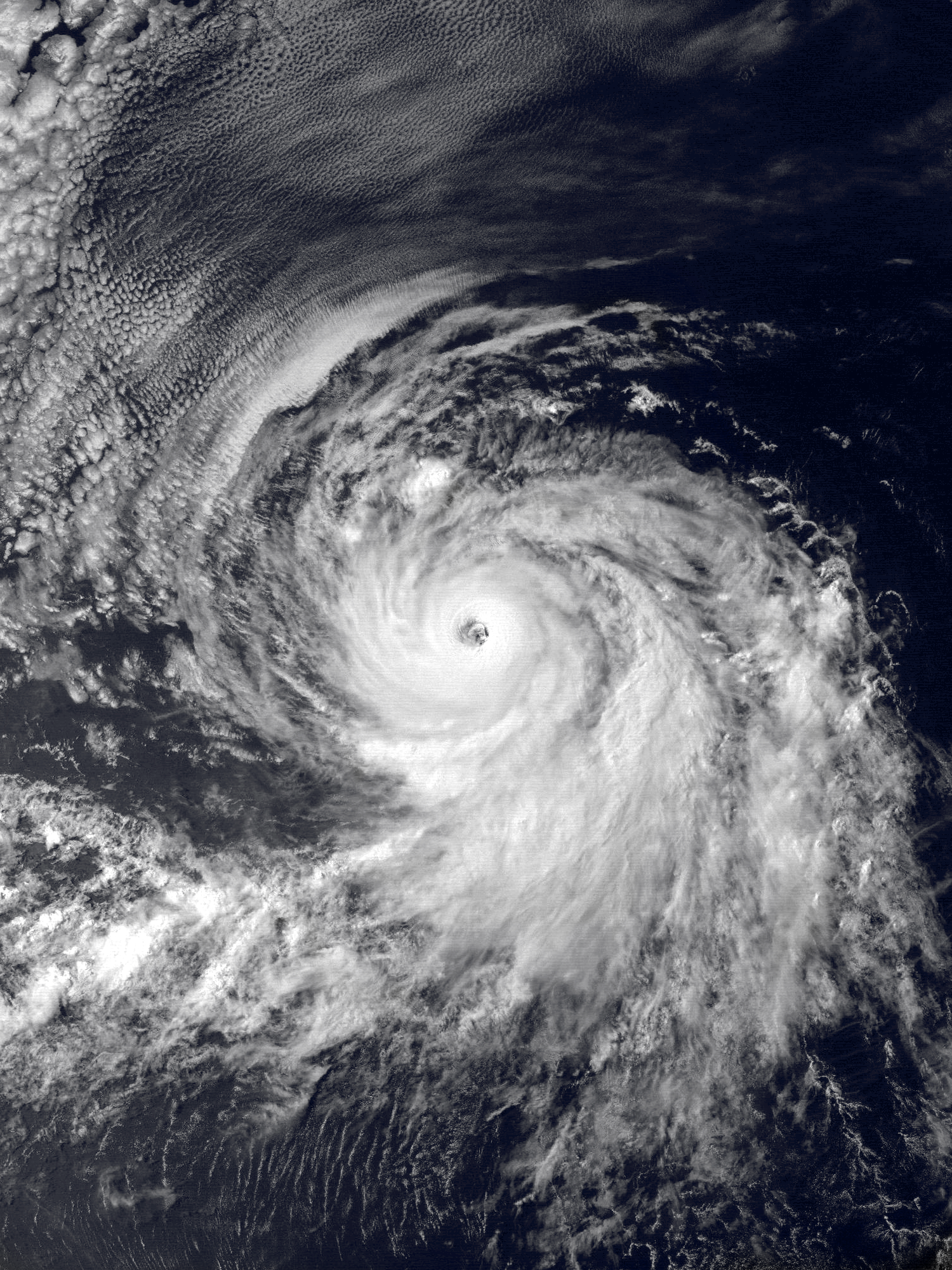
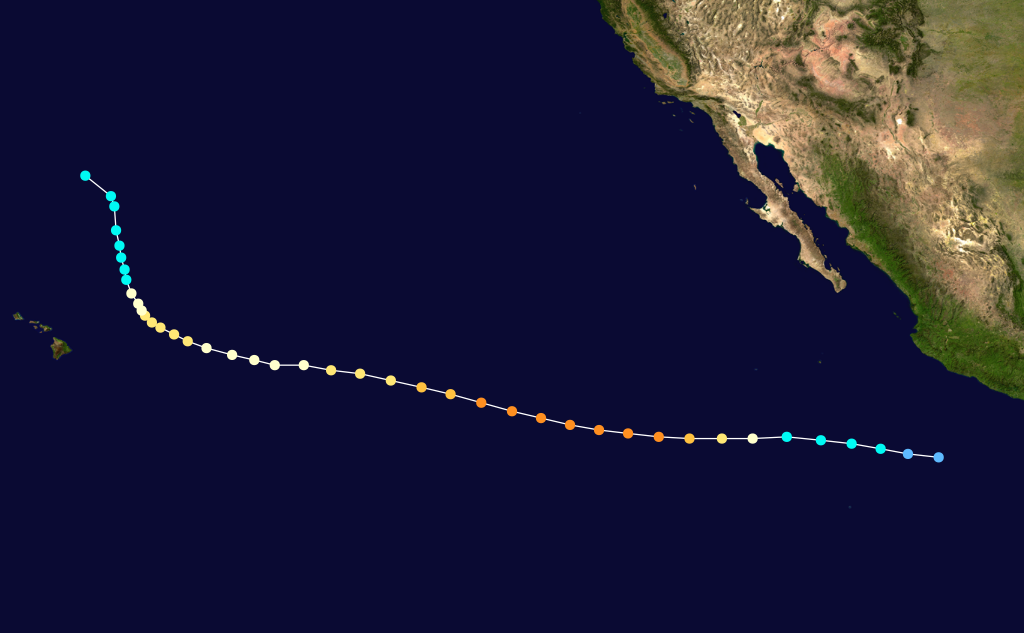
- Duration: August 9 – August 19
- Peak intensity: 145 mph (230 km/h) (1-min); 934 mbar (hPa)

A tropical wave moved across the Atlantic Ocean, producing an area of thunderstorms south of Panama on August 4. Continuing westward, the system developed into Tropical Depression Seven-E on Augus 9, about 400 mi (645 km) south of Mexico. Initially, the depression was monsoon-like, with abundant convection and well-defined upper-level outflow. Within 12 hours of forming, the depression intensified into Tropical Storm Fernanda. Banding features increased, and outflow became well-established throughout the storm. Fernanda attained hurricane status late on August 10, developing a large eye. It underwent rapid intensification, reaching winds of 145 mph (233 km/h) on August 12. This made it a Category 4 hurricane on the Saffir-Simpson scale. After maintaining peak winds for about 18 hours, the hurricane began a slow weakening trend. By August 14, the eye had become less distinct as the storm moved over cooler waters, and Fernanda fell below major hurricane status. On August 14, the CPHC began monitoring the hurricane, and there was a brief threat to Hawaii due to uncertainties in the track. Late on August 15, Fernanda reached a secondary peak of 105 mph (169 km/h), as the eye expanded to 50 mi (80 km). The hurricane slowed and turned northwestward due to an approaching trough, while weakening due to increased wind shear. Early on August 17, Fernanda made its closest approach to Hawaii, passing 305 miles (491 km) east-northeast of the island of Hawaii. Soon after, it fell to tropical storm status. On August 19, the storm transitioned into an extratropical cyclone. The remnants turned to the northeast, and on August 21 an approaching cold front absorbed the circulation off the coast of Washington.

On August 15, the Central Pacific Hurricane Center (CPHC) issued a hurricane watch for Hawaii, and the next day issued a hurricane warning for the Big Island. Officials opened nine shelters on the Big Island, and about 200 people stayed in them until the hurricane watches were canceled. Officials on the Big Island closed and evacuated all of the beach parks on August 15. On Molokai, 40 hikers were evacuated from a valley prone to flooding. Residents bought emergency supplies on Kauai, which had been struck by powerful Hurricane Iniki 11 months prior. Fernanda produced 10 to 15 feet (3.0 to 4.6 m) waves along the eastern shores of the Hawaiian Islands, reaching 20-foot (6.1 m) on parts of Maui. In the Puna district on the Big Island, 12 homes were damaged. High surf moved one home off its foundation in Maui, while also flooding other homes. The high waves also damaged coastal roads and closed several beaches. In the harbor at Hilo, one boat was damaged and another was destroyed. Although the hurricane remained away from the islands, moisture from Fernanda combined with an upper-level trough to produce rainfall across the state. Precipitation was heaviest in Kauai, where some minor flooding was reported.

=== Hurricane Greg ===
- Category 4 hurricane (SSHWS)
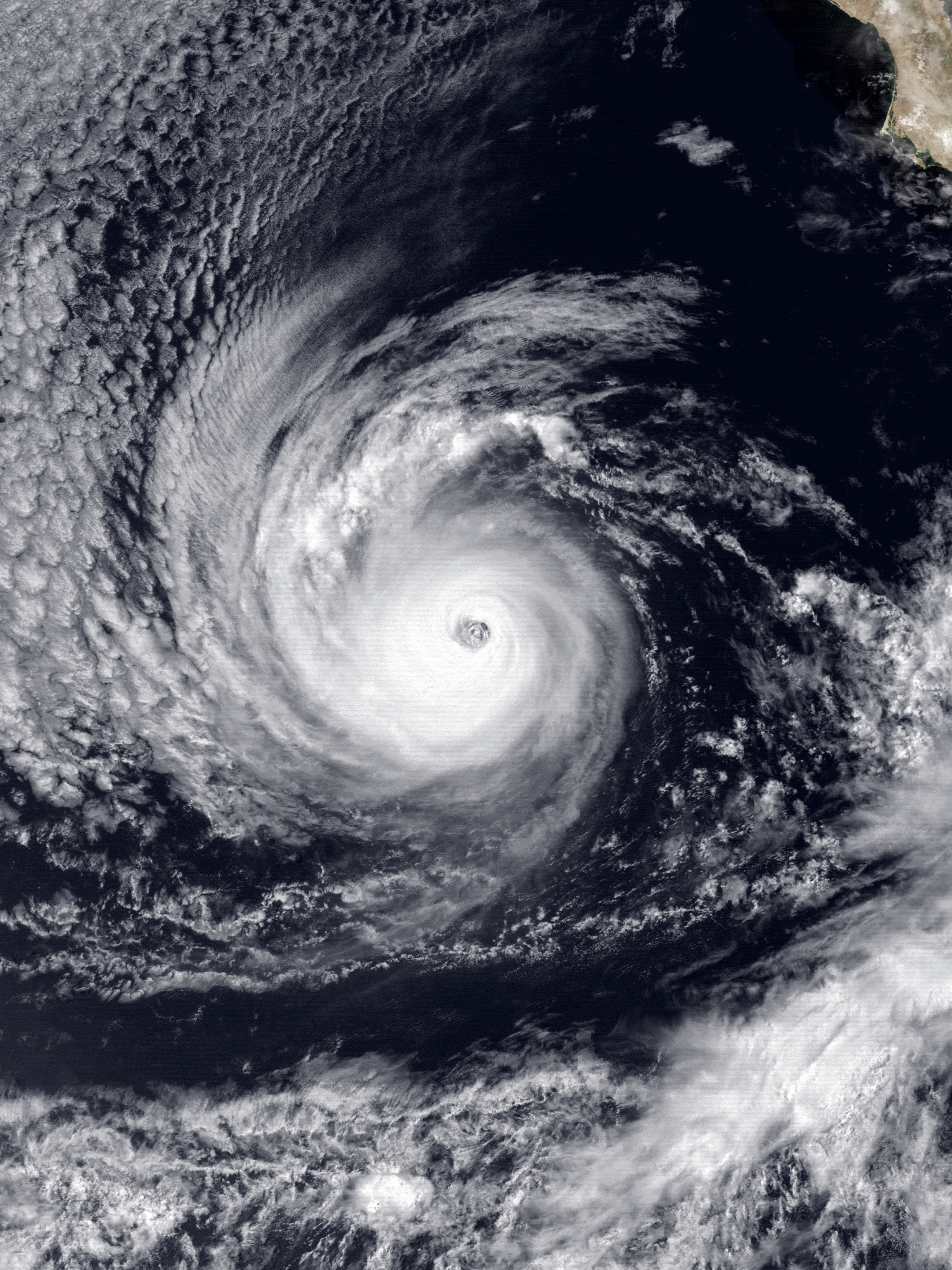
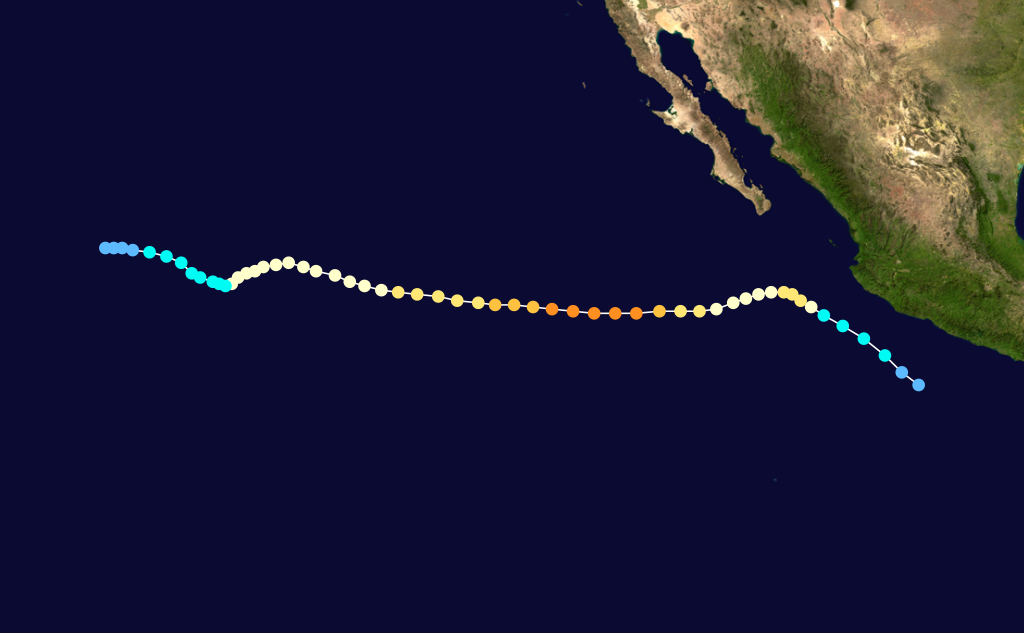
- Duration: August 15 – August 28
- Peak intensity: 130 mph (215 km/h) (1-min); 948 mbar (hPa)

On August 10, Tropical Storm Bret made landfall in Nicaragua with winds of 45 mph (72 km/h). The system moved inland and dissipated over the mountainous terrain of Central America, but an area of convection emerged into the East Pacific on August 11. The disturbance moved west and coalesced once again, developing into a tropical depression around 00:00 UTC on August 15 and further strengthening into Tropical Storm Greg twelve hours later. The system continued to intensify as it moved west-northwest parallel to the Mexico coastline, attaining hurricane status at 12:00 UTC on August 16 when an eye was first observable on satellite imagery. The system reached Category 2 strength on August 16 but weakened thereafter. Following a brief reprieve in development, Greg began to intensify rapidly on August 18, and it became yet another major hurricane at 06:00 UTC on August 19. Six hours later, Greg peaked as a Category 4 cyclone with winds of 130 mph (210 km/h). The eye became obscured from view shortly thereafter, an indication that the storm had begun a weakening trend. However, owing to its roughly parallel track to 79 °F (26 °C) ocean waters, Greg only slowly weakened over ensuing days. The cyclone curved west-southwest and crossed into the Central Pacific as a tropical depression on August 28. The system dissipated about 700 mi (1,100 km) east of Hawaii that day, though its remnant circulation meandered east of the island through early September.

=== Hurricane Hilary ===
- Category 3 hurricane (SSHWS)
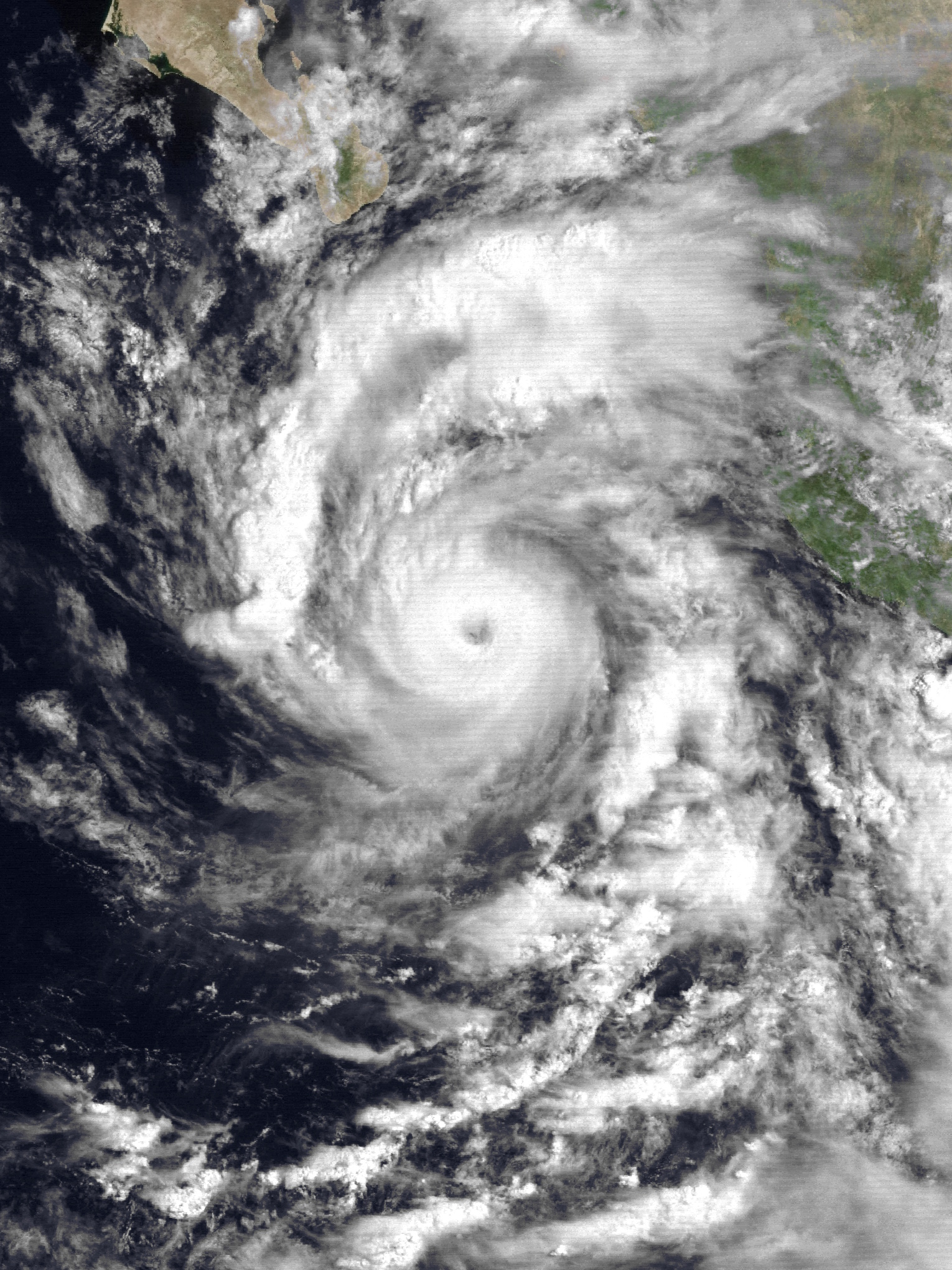
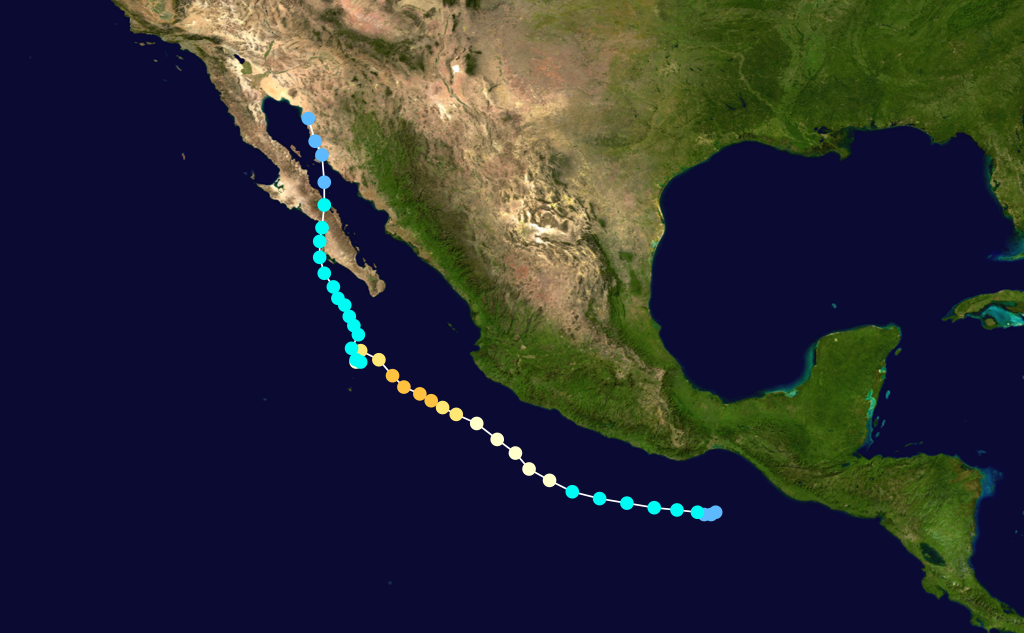
- Duration: August 17 – August 27
- Peak intensity: 120 mph (195 km/h) (1-min); 957 mbar (hPa)

Areas of convection developed in association with a tropical wave on August 14 near Central America. On August 16, the wave entered the Gulf of Tehuantepec. The next morning, Tropical Depression Nine-E formed. Banding features slowly increased, and on August 18, the depression became Tropical Storm Hilary, 100 mi (160 km) south of the Pacific coast of Mexico. Hilary steadily gained strength, but its outflow remained restricted while moving northwest, parallel to the coast of Mexico due to a complex steering pattern. However, on August 19, Hilary developed cold cloud tops and strengthened into a hurricane. The next day, an eye formed; subsequently, Hilary reached Category 2 intensity, with winds extending out 130 mi (210 km) from the center. Hilary became a major hurricane early on August 21. Shortly thereafter, Hilary reached its peak intensity with winds of 120 mph (155 km/h) and developed a 15 mi (24 km) eye. The hurricane then turned west on August 22 and became nearly stationary the next day. Slowly executing a small counter-clockwise loop, Hilary underwent a Fujiwhara interaction with Tropical Storm Irwin which was several hundred miles southeast. Meanwhile, Hilary began to weaken, by early on August 22, the eye became poorly defined and convection diminished. On August 23, Hilary was downgraded to a tropical storm. The interaction continued to weaken Hilary before it resumed a northerly motion. On August 24, Hilary absorbed Irwin. Hilary made landfall in Baja California Sur twice as a strong tropical storm on August 25. As a tropical depression, Hilary made its final landfall on August 26 just west of Hermosillo, Sonora. While moisture from Hilary got pulled inland by a shortwave trough, the low level center dissipated in the northern Gulf on August 27.

Hurricane watches were issued for much of the southern coast of Mexico while tropical storm warnings were issued for the Baja California Peninsula and the Gulf of California coastline. A rainfall total of 11.35 in (288 mm) was recorded in Derivorda Jale, Colima. A rainfall total of 4.33 in (110 mm) was recorded in Huerta Vieja, Baja California Sur. Strong winds were recorded along the peninsula. Hilary also brought downpours to parts of California and Arizona, resulting in flash floods. Over 25% of the summer rainfall was recorded in portions of New Mexico. The remains of Hilary combined with a cold front to produce widespread flooding across the Midwestern United States. About 10 in (250 mm) fell in some areas of Iowa, forcing rivers overflow their banks. Hundreds of people evacuated their homes.

=== Tropical Storm Irwin ===
- Tropical storm (SSHWS)
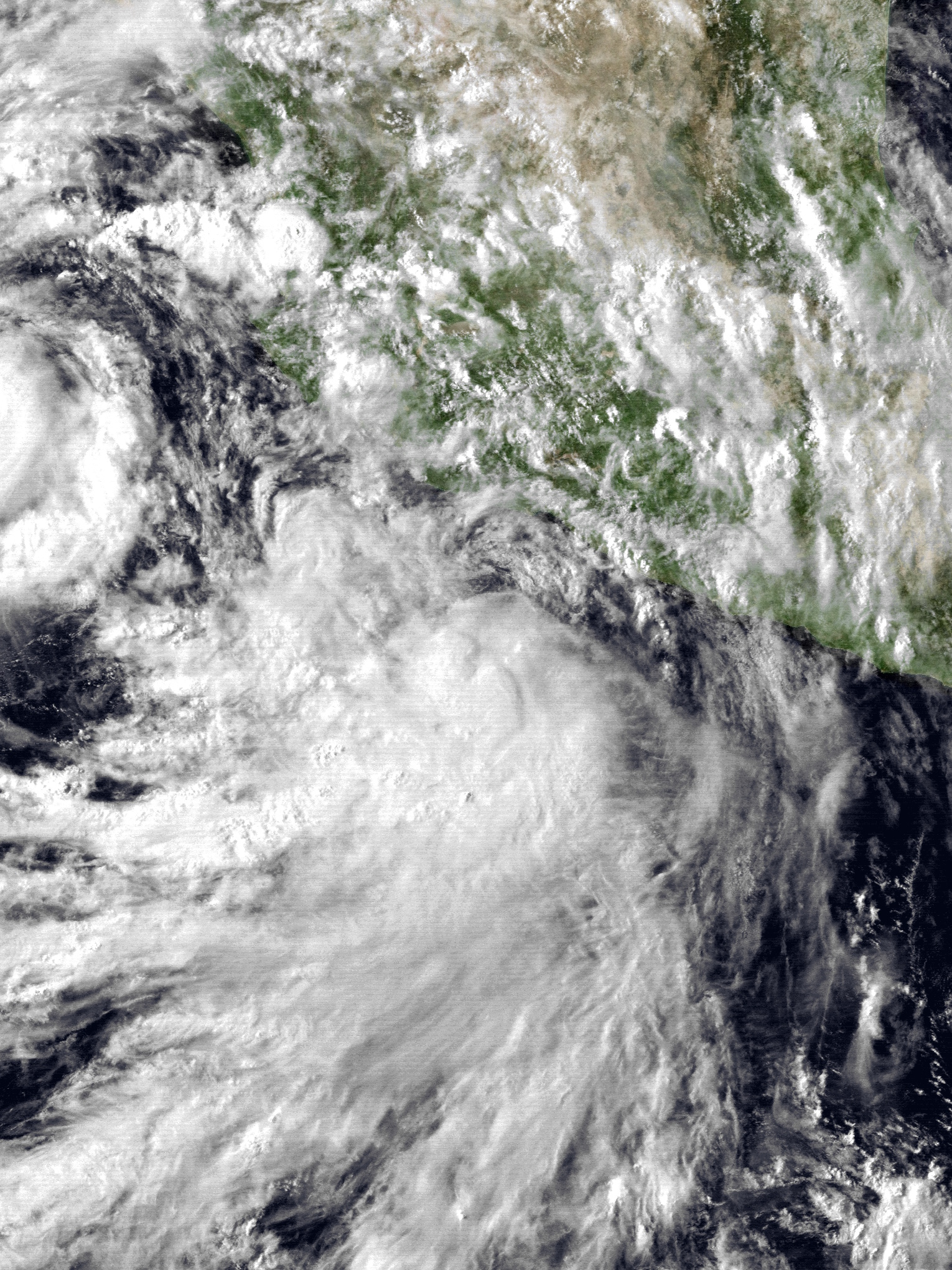
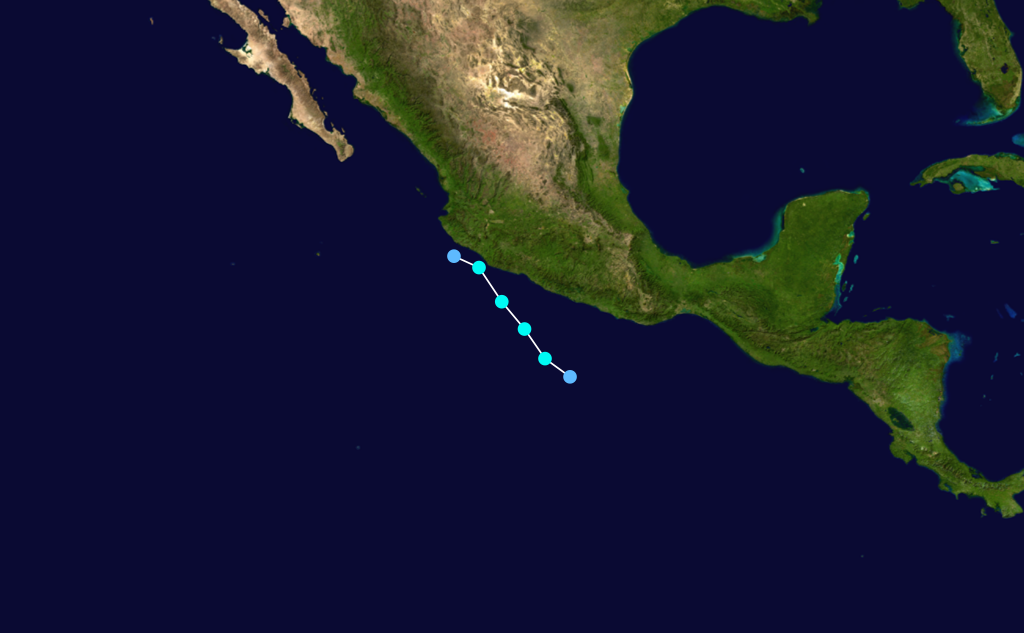
- Duration: August 21 – August 22
- Peak intensity: 70 mph (110 km/h) (1-min); 999 mbar (hPa)

A tropical wave spawned Tropical Storm Cindy in the Atlantic and continued west, likely leading to an uptick in convection south of the Gulf of Tehuantepec on August 20. Around 06:00 UTC the next day, that disturbance organized into a tropical depression; six hours later, it developed into Tropical Storm Irwin. The cyclone maintained a poorly organized appearance for its duration, but observations along the Mexico coastline and from nearby ships suggest Irwin reached winds of 70 mph (110 km/h) at its peak. The system moved northwest parallel to the coastline of Mexico and underwent binary interaction with nearby Hurricane Hilary. That stronger, larger system absorbed Irwin around 18:00 UTC on August 22. Irwin produced a maximum rainfall total of 7 in (180 mm) in Jala, Colima, along with a wind gust to 66 mph (106 km/h) in nearby Manzanillo.

=== Hurricane Jova ===
- Category 4 hurricane (SSHWS)
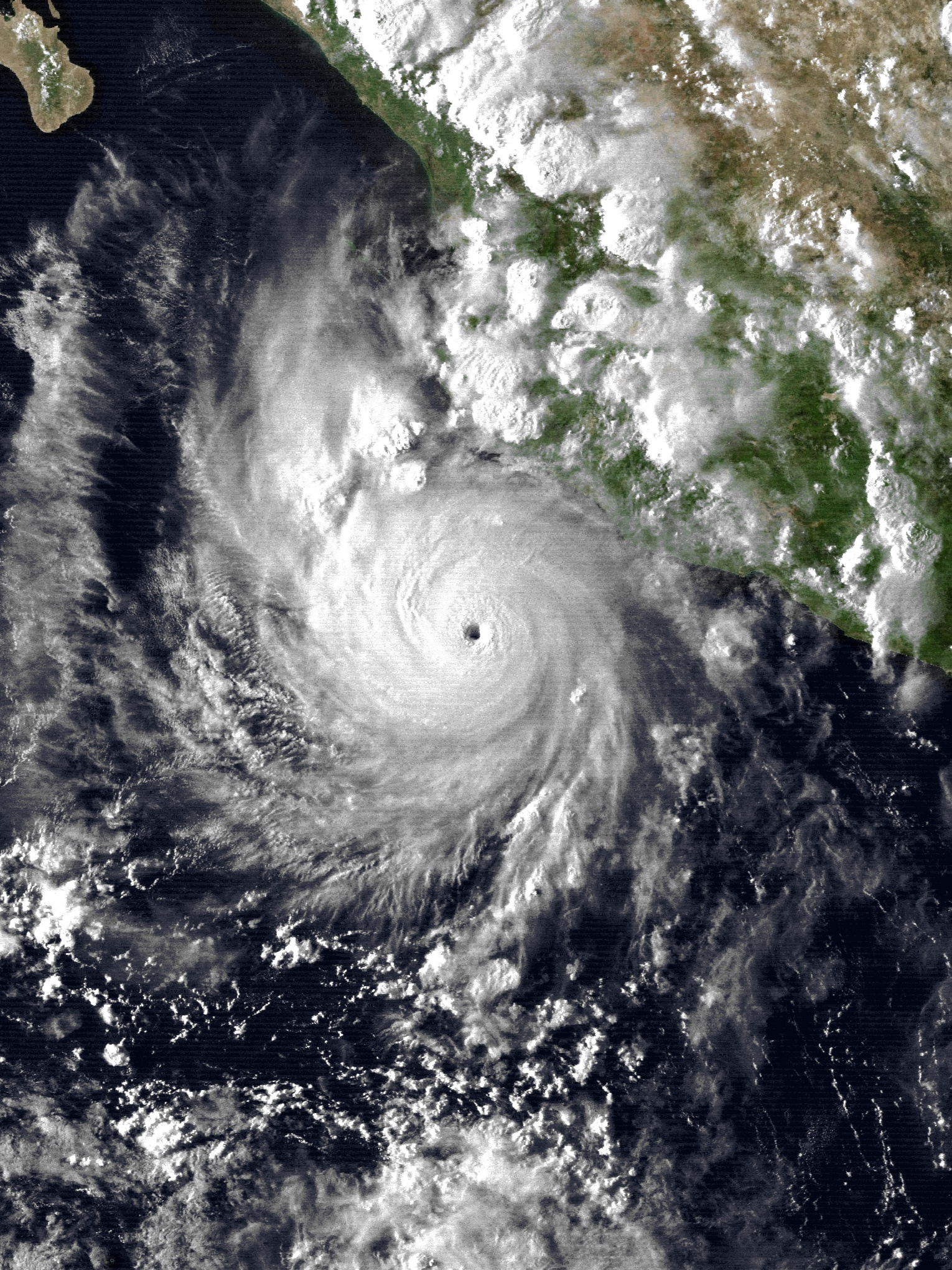
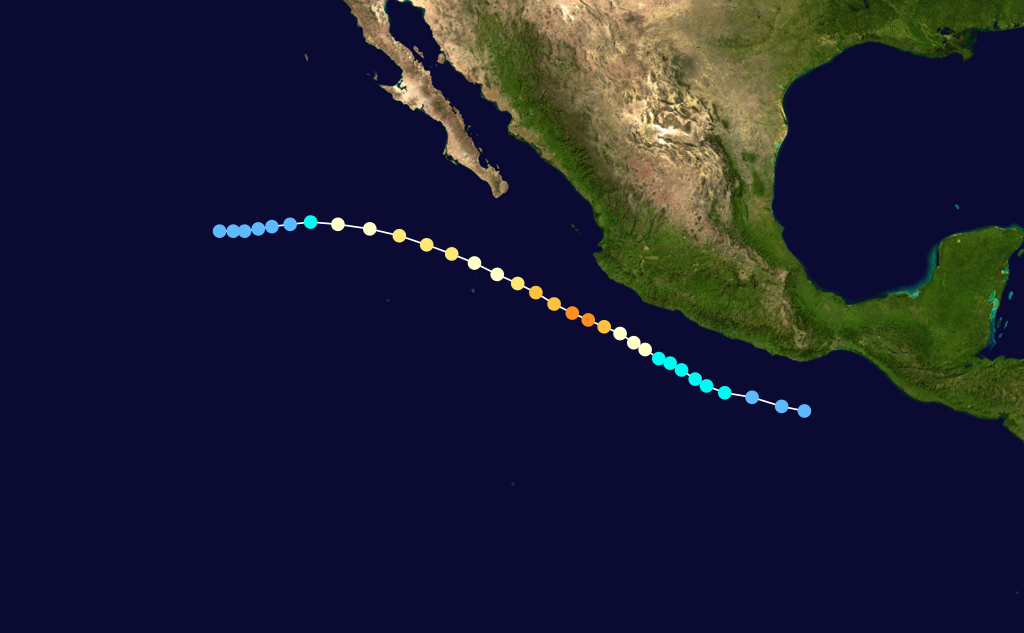
- Duration: August 29 – September 5
- Peak intensity: 130 mph (215 km/h) (1-min); 948 mbar (hPa)

A tropical wave moved off Africa on August 14 and remained a distinct feature on its voyage across the Atlantic. The wave spawned an area of disturbed weather south of Mexico that began to show signs of organization by August 26. Three days later, at 00:00 UTC, the system developed into a tropical depression. An upper-level anticyclone provided a low wind shear environment around the cyclone, facilitating its quick intensification over later days. It became Tropical Storm Jova at 18:00 UTC on August 29, a hurricane around 06:00 UTC on August 31, and a major hurricane – the fifth in August alone – eighteen hours later. On September 1, Jova became a Category 4 hurricane with peak winds of 130 mph (210 km/h). The system encountered increasingly cool waters as it moved northwest parallel to the Mexico coastline and began to weaken accordingly, though this process was temporarily interrupted by a reappearance of its eye on September 2 and restrengthening into a Category 2 hurricane on September 3. As the system passed about 805 mi (1,295 km) south of Baja California Sur around 00:00 UTC on September 6, it was reduced to a bare swirl of statrocumulus clouds. The outer bands of Jova produced heavy rainfall in Durango, particular in its capital Durango City, prompting the evacuation of 1,500 people across 20 neighborhoods because of flooded homes.

=== Hurricane Kenneth ===
- Category 4 hurricane (SSHWS)
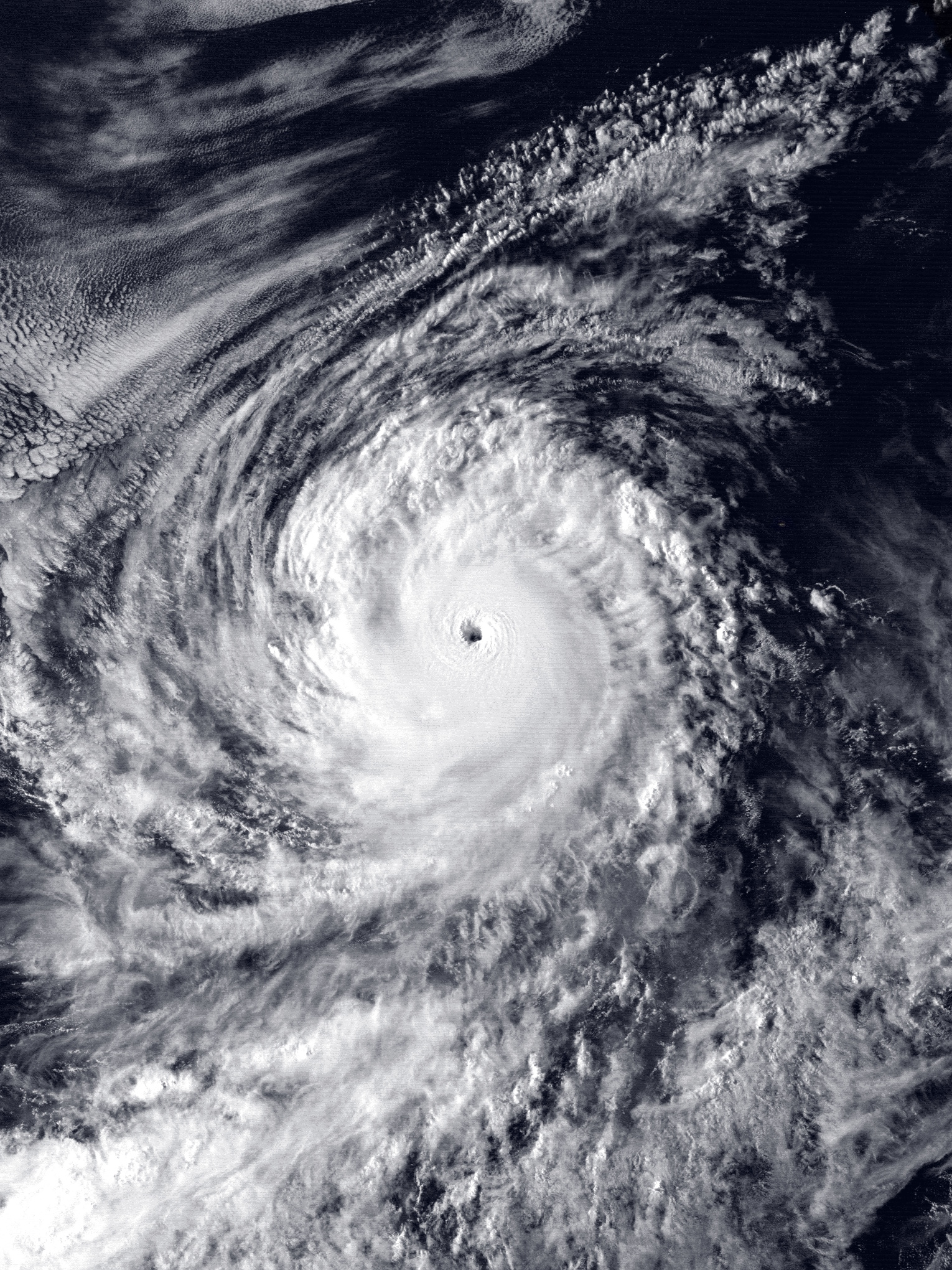
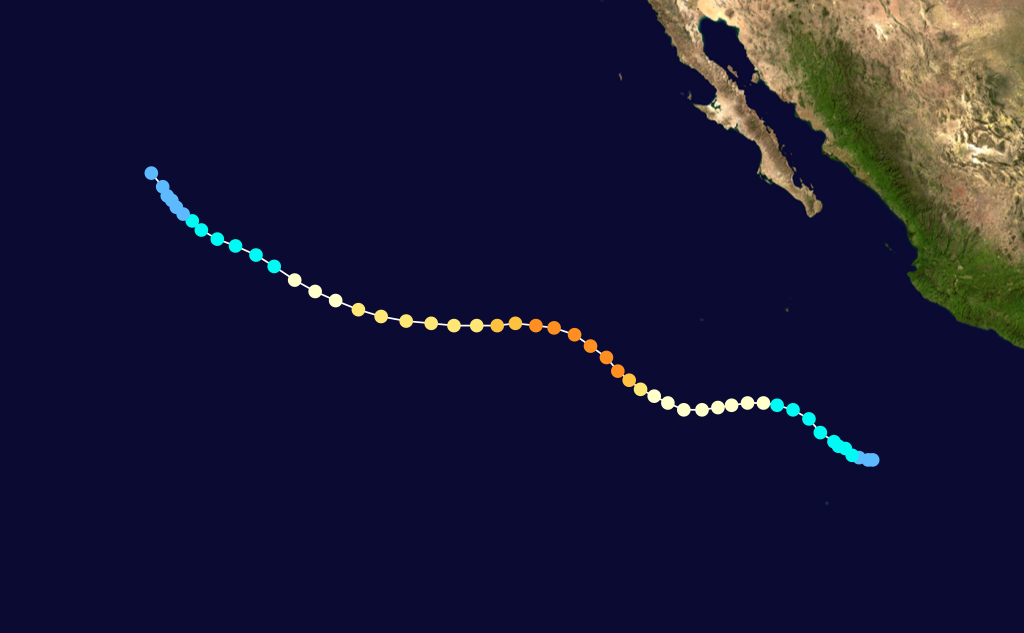
- Duration: September 5 – September 17
- Peak intensity: 150 mph (240 km/h) (1-min); 932 mbar (hPa)

On August 30, a tropical disturbance developed south of Panama. Around 12:00 UTC on September 5, the system organized into a tropical depression as thunderstorms coalesced into loosely defined rainbands. These bands increased in intensity over subsequent hours, signaling the cyclone's intensification into Tropical Storm Kenneth by 06:00 UTC on September 6. Over the coming days, the cyclone moved on a sinussoidal-like path across the East Pacific, alternating between west and west-northwest. On September 8, Kenneth attained hurricane strength, which was followed by its development into a major hurricane on September 10, shortly after an eye first appeared on satellite. Early the following day, it became a powerful Category 4 cyclone with peak winds of 150 mph (240 km/h). Kenneth displayed a small but well-defined eye embedded within a very cold central dense overcast at this time. Soon, the cyclone encountered cooler waters and southwesterly wind shear on its northwest trek, which caused the system to decay. Kenneth dissipated at 00:00 UTC on September 18, though its remnant circulation persisted for a few more days.

=== Hurricane Lidia ===
- Category 4 hurricane (SSHWS)
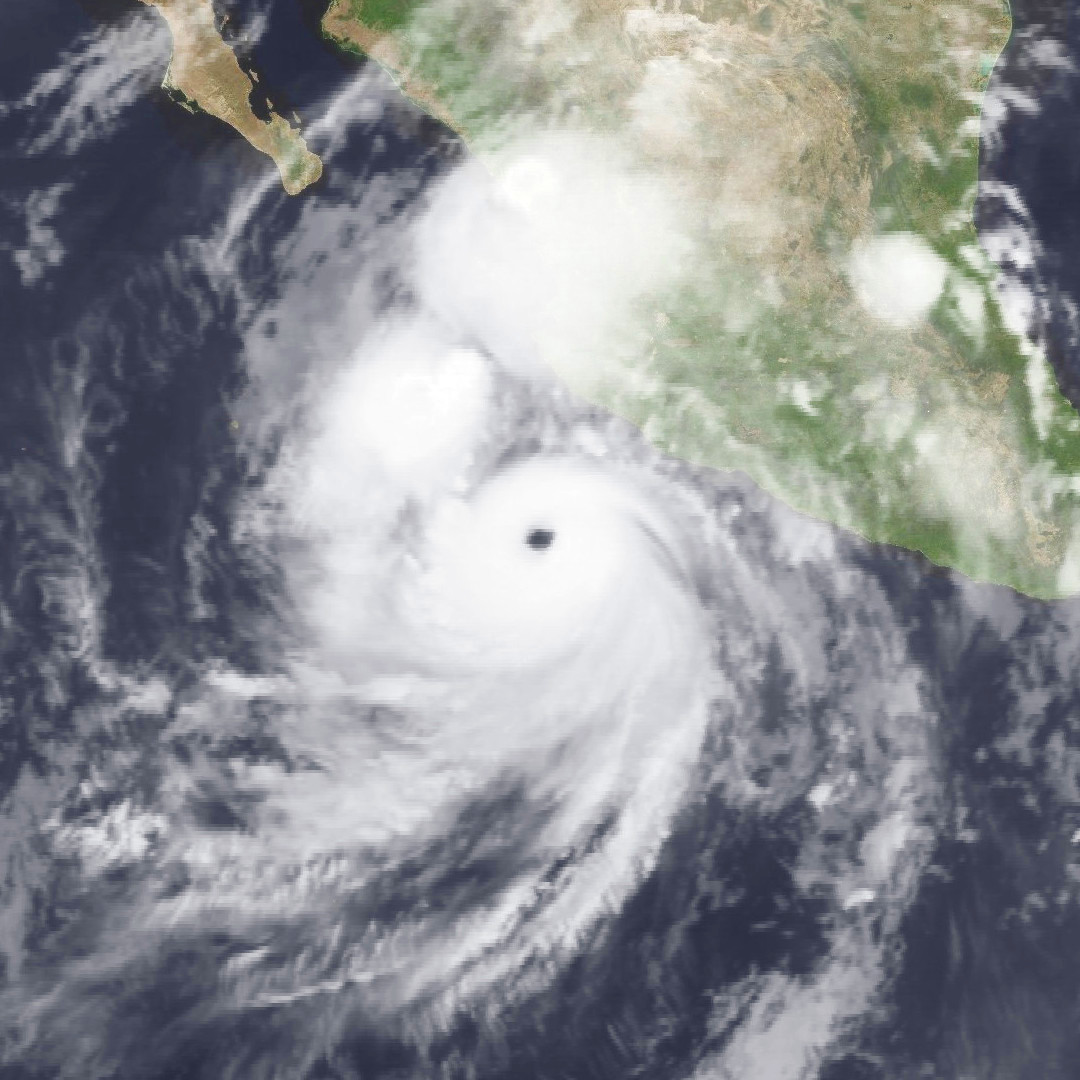
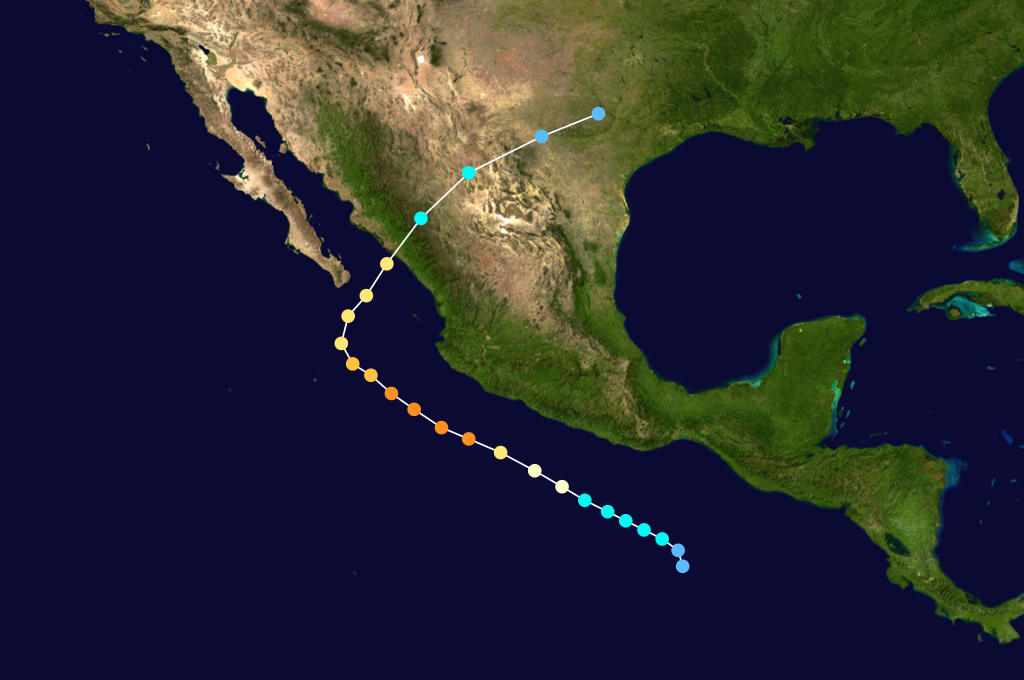
- Duration: September 8 – September 14
- Peak intensity: 150 mph (240 km/h) (1-min); 930 mbar (hPa)

A tropical wave departed Africa on August 24 and reached the East Pacific on September 4, where it began to organize. The system congealed into a tropical depression by 12:00 UTC on September 8 after it developed tightly curled rainbands. It intensified into Tropical Storm Lidia six hours after formation, and it became a hurricane by 06:00 UTC on September 10. The cyclone paralleled the coastline of Mexico on a west-northwest course, and it continued to strengthen as outflow expanded in all directions. In a 24-hour period ending at 06:00 UTC on September 11, Lidia underwent a period of rapid intensification, with its winds increasing from 80 mph (130 km/h) to a peak of 150 mph (240 km/h). Satellite imagery around this time showed a hurricane with a large, well-defined eye surrounded by intense convection. After peak, the cyclone recurved northeast ahead of an upper-level trough, bringing Lidia onshore south-southwest of Culiacan, Sinaloa, with winds of 100 mph (160 km/h) around 08:00 UTC on September 13. The system dissipated over central Texas on September 14 as it merged with a cold front.

Though no measurements were recorded, winds near hurricane force were reported near the storm's landfall point. Heavy rainfall accompanied Lidia, peaking at 8.17 in (208 mm) in La Cruz, where 100 houses were reportedly destroyed. The combination of wind and rain were said to have demolished hundreds of shanty-style houses in the Mazatlan area. Across Durango, 16 homes were destroyed and some 4,000 others were damaged. In Nayarit, agriculture was declared a complete loss across four counties, and in Sinaloa, about 1,200 head of cattle were killed. A 150 ft (46 m) broadcasting tower in Culiacan was toppled. At least 10,000 people were displaced throughout Mexico. Up to seven people were reportedly killed, including one from electrocution and one from the collapse of a structure. One person was injured as well.

=== Tropical Depression Fourteen-E ===
- Tropical depression (SSHWS)
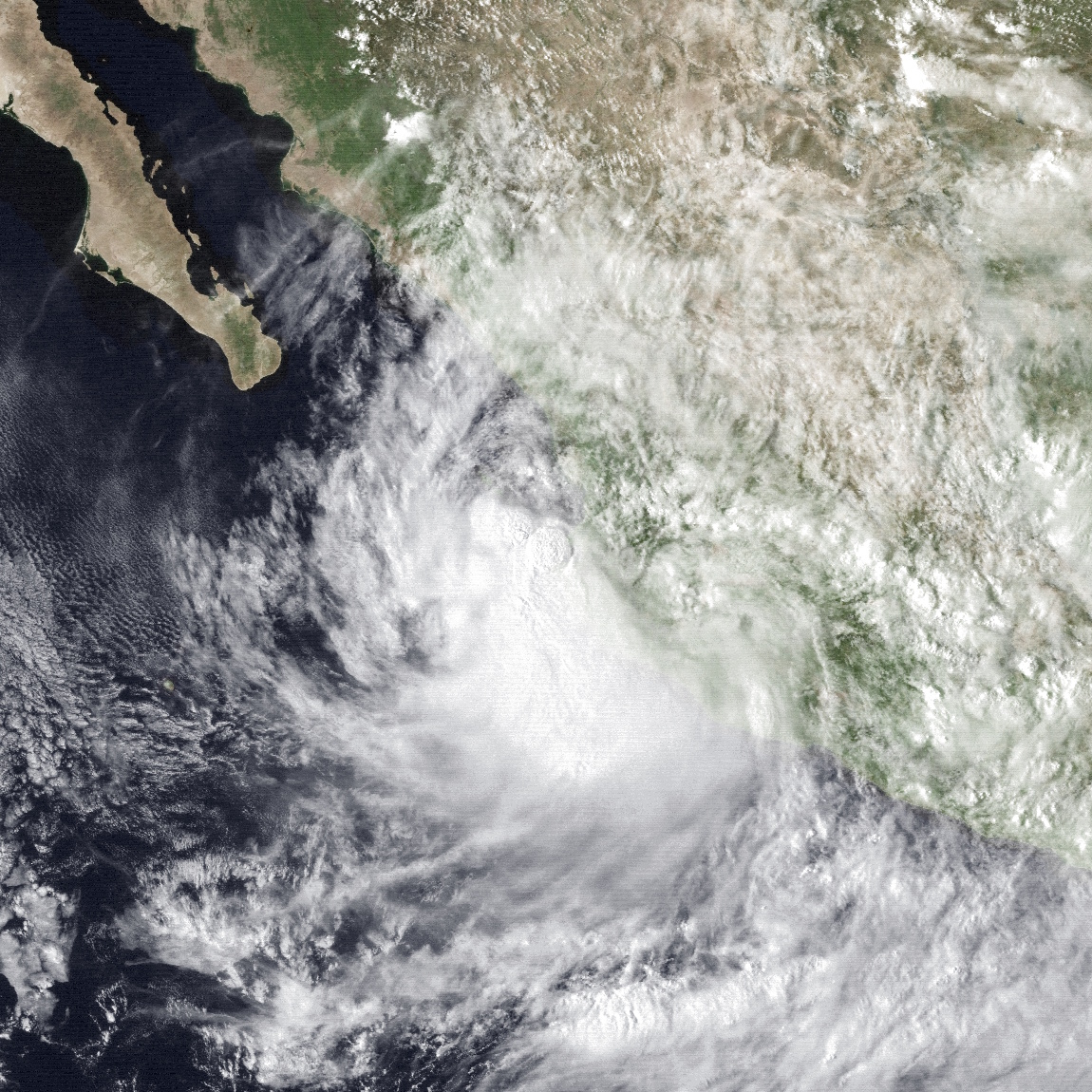
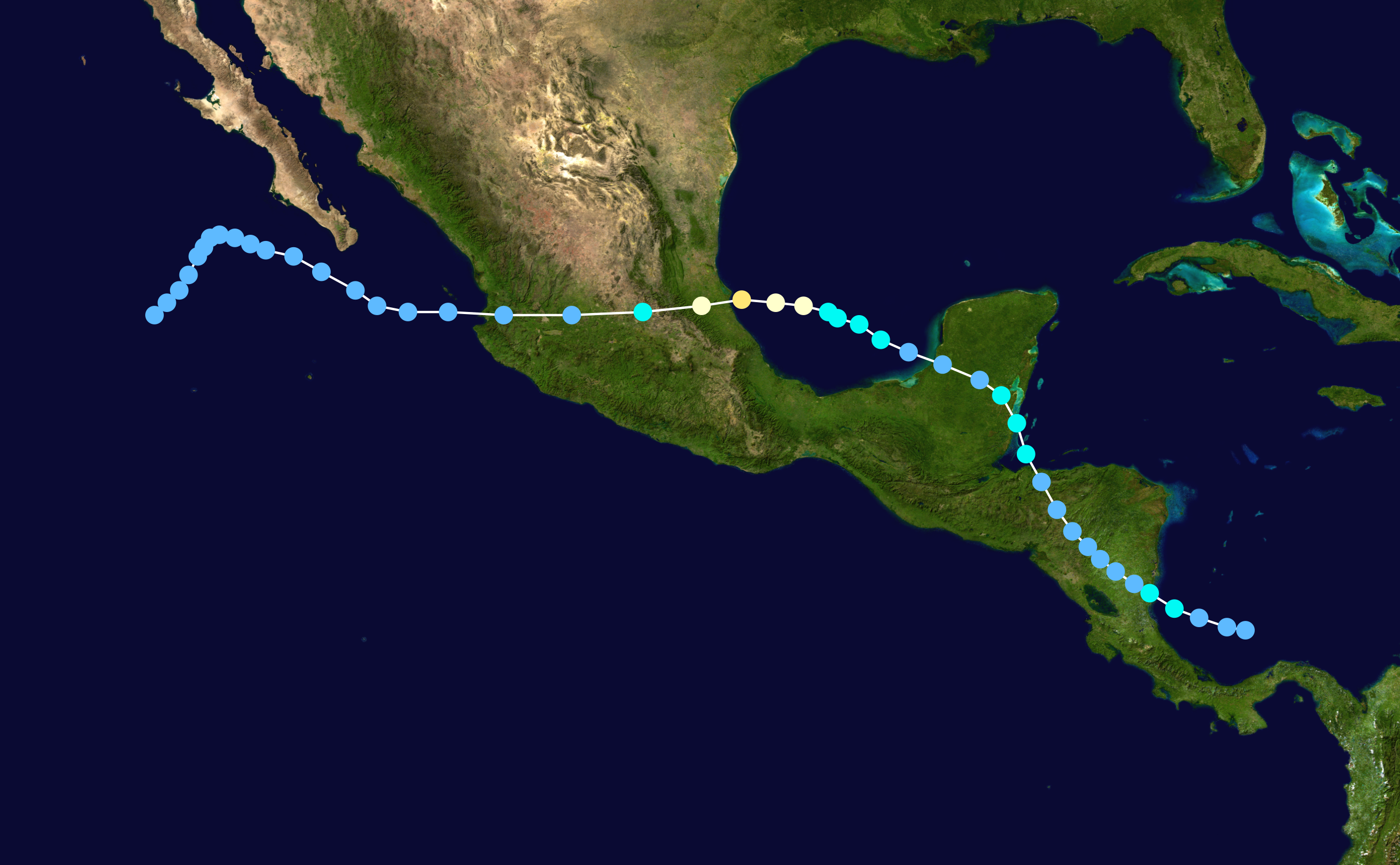
- Duration: September 21 – September 25
- Peak intensity: 35 mph (55 km/h) (1-min); 1002 mbar (hPa)

The large circulation of the Atlantic's Hurricane Gert survived its trek over Mexico and re-emerged into the East Pacific on September 21. It organized offshore and as such was reclassified as Tropical Depression Fourteen-E at 00:00 UTC on September 22. The system moved west to west-northwest initially, and it developed a small collection of thunderstorms the next day that suggested it was close to tropical storm intensity. The depression became increasingly disorganized by September 24, though, and it curved southwest in a weakened state. The cyclone dissipated around 00:00 UTC on September 26.

=== Tropical Storm Max ===
- Tropical storm (SSHWS)
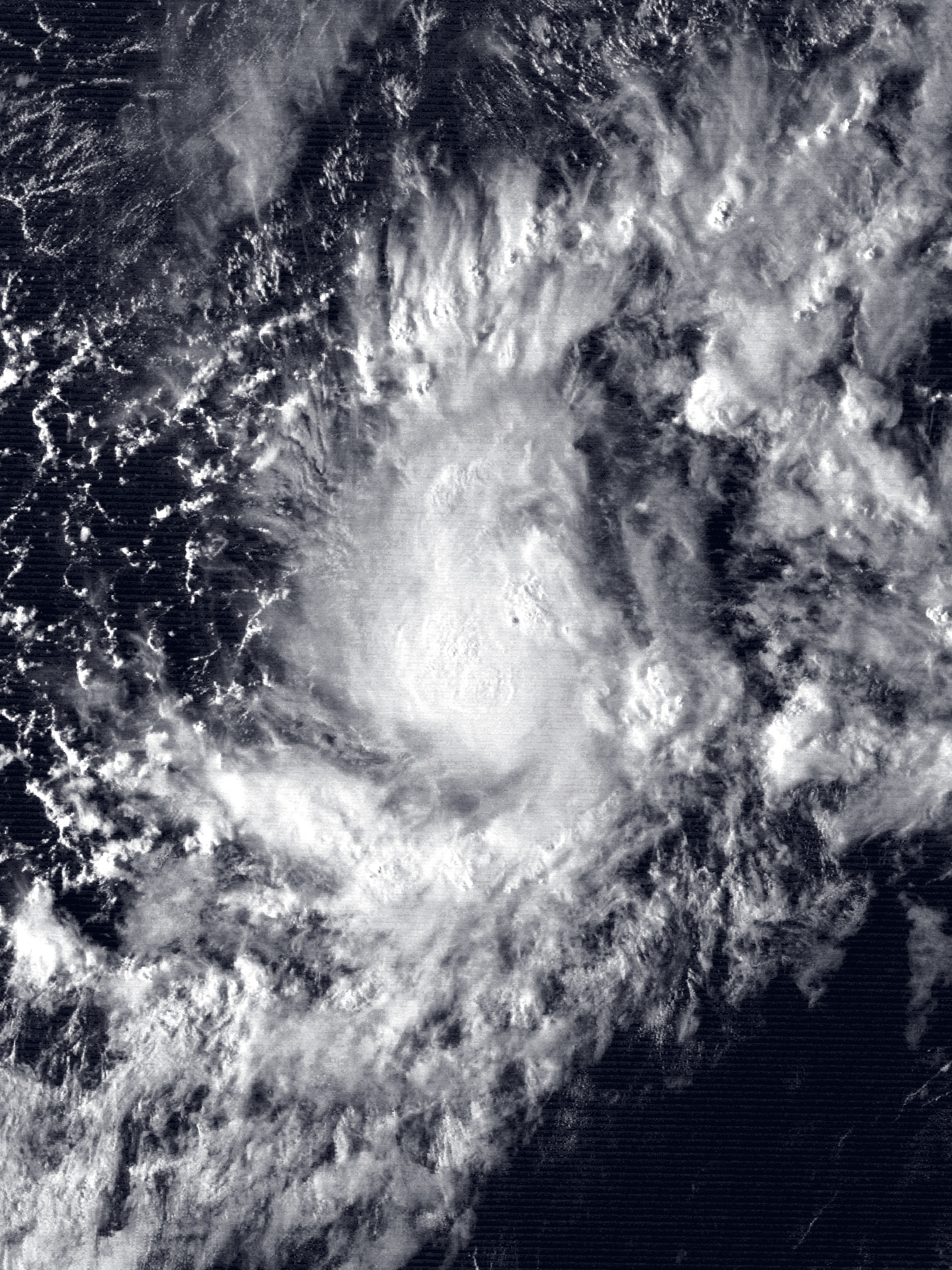
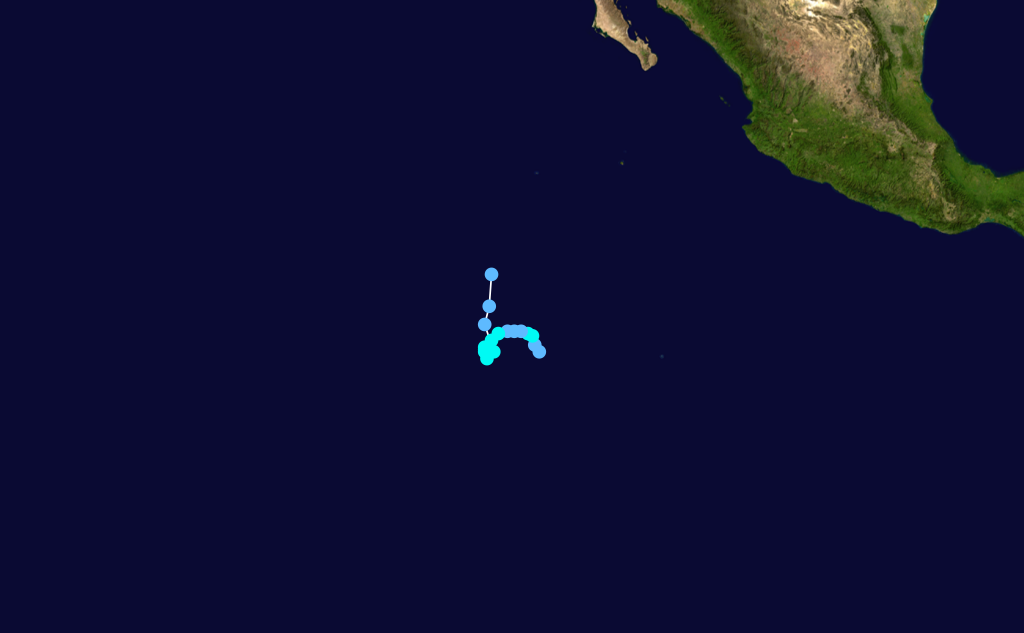
- Duration: September 30 – October 3
- Peak intensity: 45 mph (75 km/h) (1-min); 1000 mbar (hPa)

Max's origin appears to be related to an area of convection south of Mexico that likely spawned from a tropical wave. The disturbance formed around 00:00 UTC on September 30 and intensified into Tropical Storm Max twelve hours later. In close proximity to strong upper-level winds, the newly designated cyclone was stripped it of its convection and weakened back to tropical depression strength on October 1. As it moved erratically over the open East Pacific, it soon became nestled underneath an expansive anticyclone aloft, which provided a low wind shear environment. Max regained tropical storm strength and reached peak winds of 45 mph (72 km/h) on October 2. Throughout its duration, the system moved erratically as it interacted with the larger circulation of Tropical Storm Norma to the east until finally it was absorbed by that cyclone around 00:00 UTC on October 4.

=== Tropical Storm Norma ===
- Tropical storm (SSHWS)
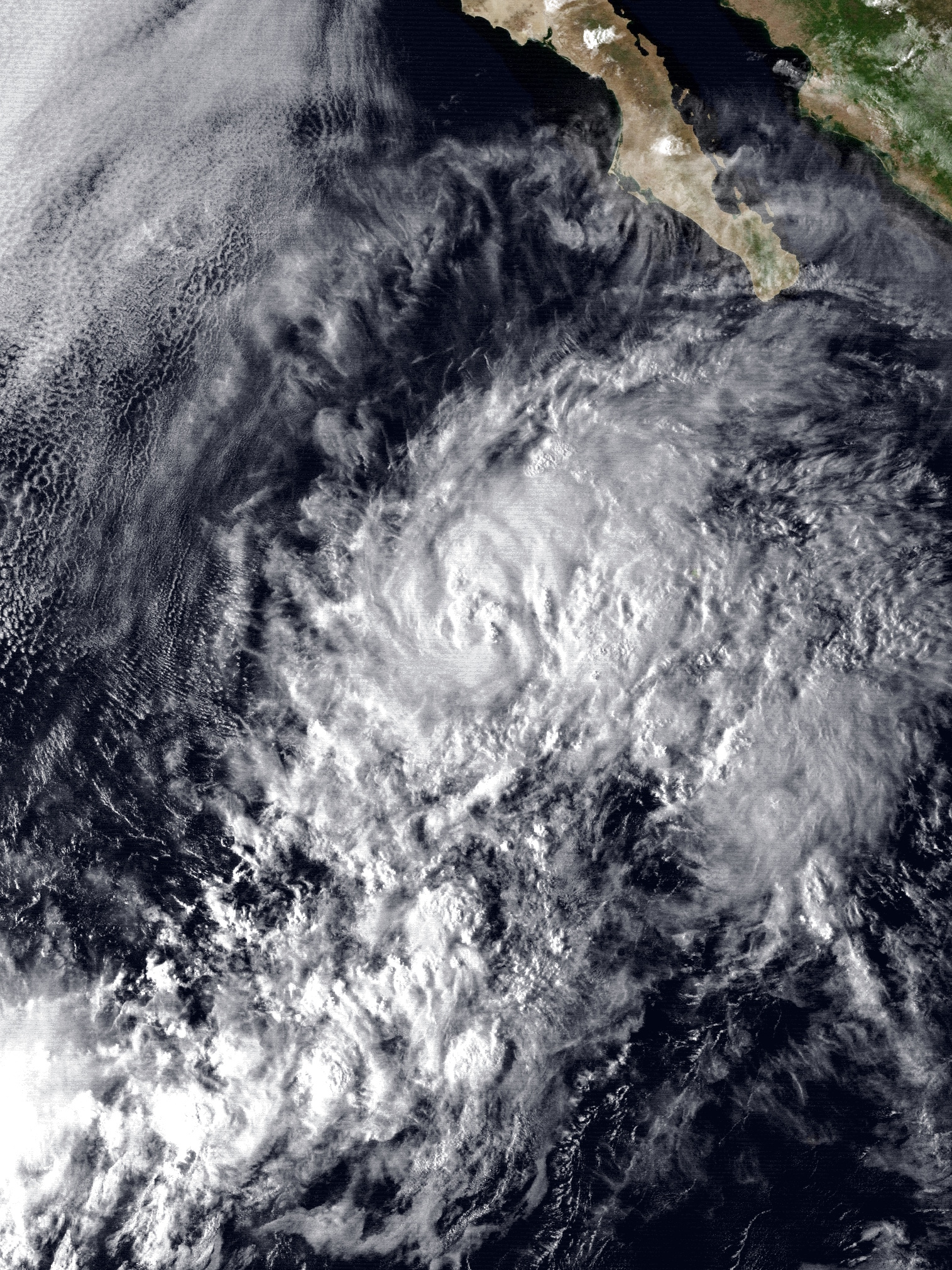
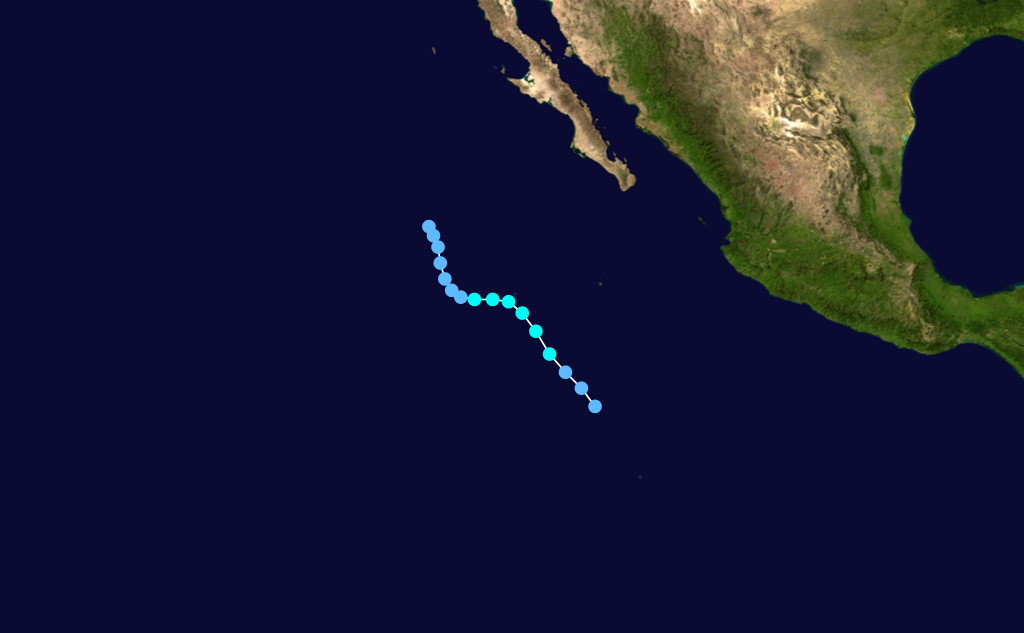
- Duration: October 2 – October 6
- Peak intensity: 50 mph (85 km/h) (1-min); 1000 mbar (hPa)

A large area of disturbed weather was identified south of Acapulco on September 29, potentially spawned by a tropical wave that left Africa 12 days earlier. The disturbance was upgraded to a tropical depression at 1800 UTC on October 2 while centered about 690 mi (1,110 km) south of Baja California Sur. The system was originally embedded underneath a large anticyclone aloft, which provided a low wind shear environment for it to become Tropical Storm Norma on October 3 and reach peak winds of 50 mph (80 km/h) the next day. Around this time, the system absorbed the smaller Tropical Storm Max. Norma moved generally northwest and encountered strong southwesterly wind shear, which caused it to dissipate after 18:00 UTC on October 6.

=== Tropical Depression Seventeen-E ===
- Tropical depression (SSHWS)
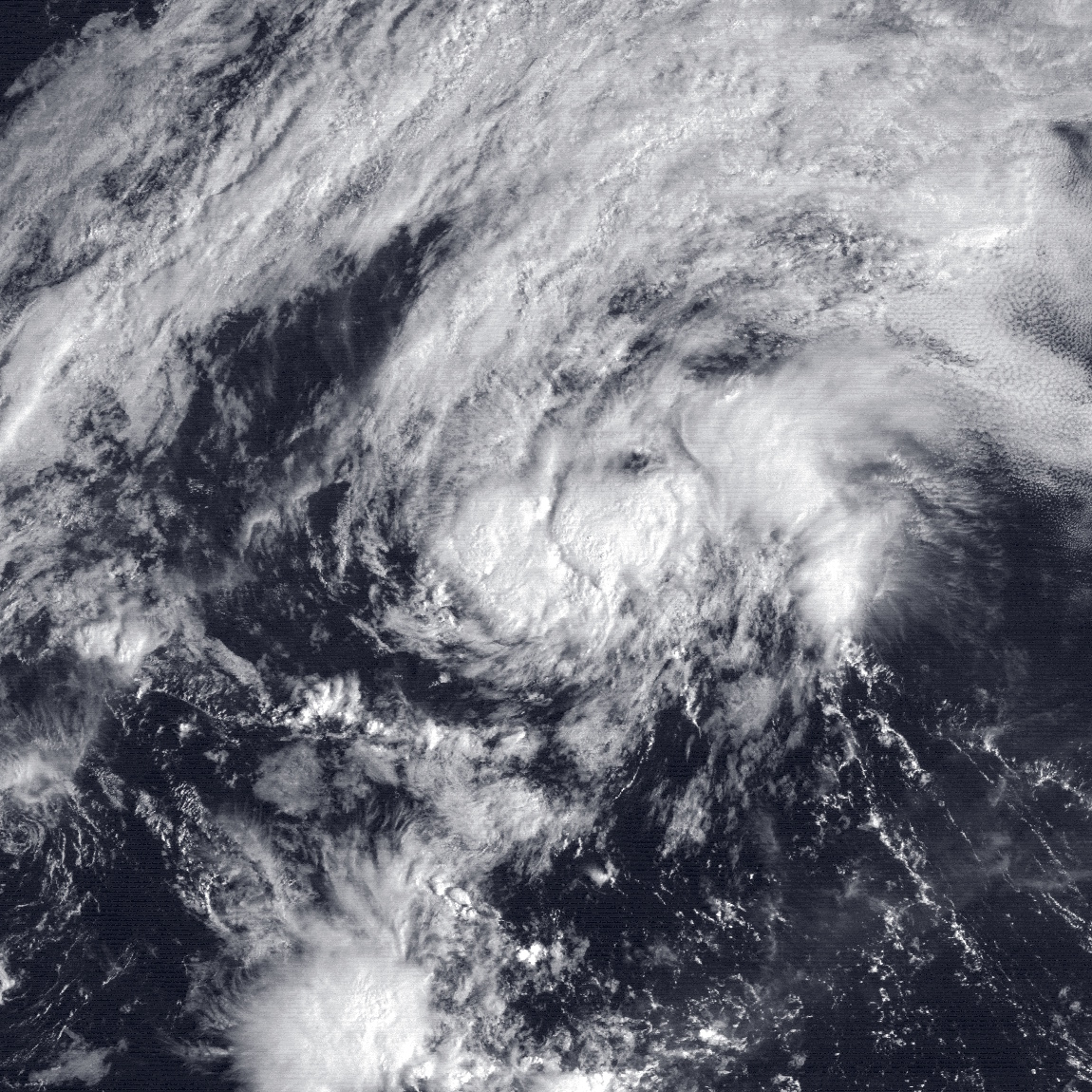
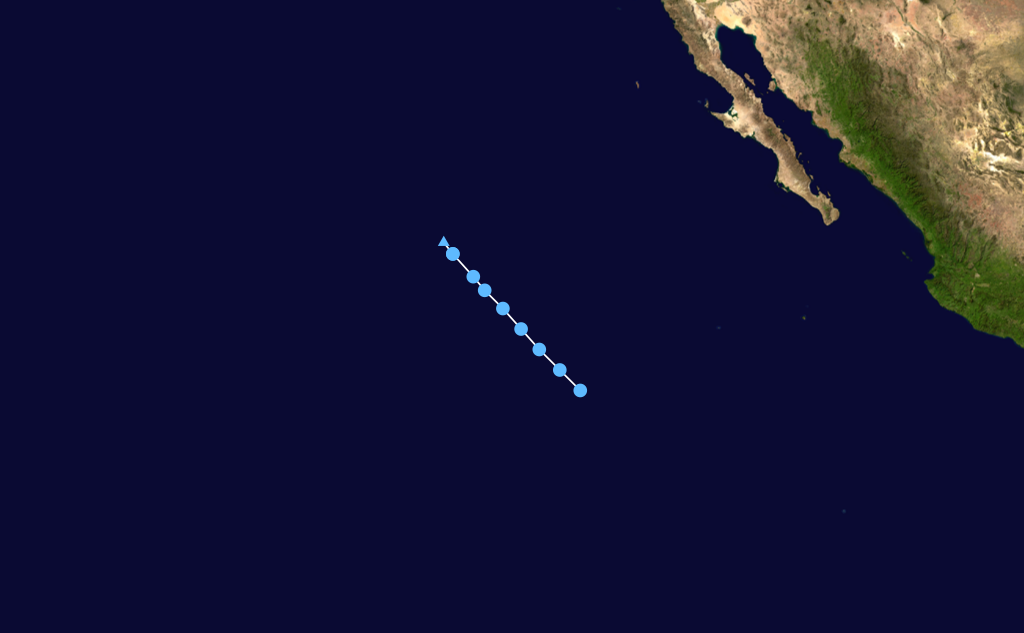
- Duration: October 11 – October 13
- Peak intensity: 35 mph (55 km/h) (1-min); 1009 mbar (hPa)

At 18:00 UTC on October 11, the season's final tropical depression formed over the East Pacific and moved northwest. The system was poorly organized, with a circulation elongated west to east, and embedded within an environment of strong wind shear. Thus, it never became a tropical storm and instead dissipated around 00:00 UTC on October 14.

== Storm names ==
The following list of names was used for named storms that formed in the North Pacific Ocean east of 140°W in 1993. This is the same list used for the 1987 season except for Kenneth, which replaced Knut. The name Kenneth was used for the first time in 1993. No names were retired from this list following the season, and it was used again for the 1999 season.

- Adrian
- Beatriz
- Calvin
- Dora *
- Eugene *
- Fernanda *
- Greg
- Hilary
- Irwin
- Jova
- Kenneth
- Lidia
- Max
- Norma
- Otis (unused)
- Pilar (unused)
- Ramon (unused)
- Selma (unused)
- Todd (unused)
- Veronica (unused)
- Wiley (unused)
- Xina (unused)
- York (unused)
- Zelda (unused)

For storms that form in the North Pacific from 140°W to the International Date Line, the names come from a series of four rotating lists. Names are used one after the other without regard to year, and when the bottom of one list is reached, the next named storm receives the name at the top of the next list. One named storm, listed below, formed in the central North Pacific in 1993. Named storms in the table above that crossed into the area during the year are noted (*).

- Keoni

== Season effects ==
This is a table of all of the tropical cyclones that formed in the 1993 Pacific hurricane season. It includes their name, duration, peak classification and intensities, areas affected, damage, and death totals. Deaths in parentheses are additional and indirect (an example of an indirect death would be a traffic accident), but were still related to that storm. Damage and deaths include totals while the storm was extratropical, a wave, or a low, and all of the damage figures are in 1993 USD.

Saffir–Simpson scale
TD	TS	C1	C2	C3	C4	C5

1993 Pacific tropical cyclone season statistics
Storm name	Dates active	Storm category at peak intensity	Max 1-min wind mph (km/h)	Min. press. (mbar)	Areas affected	Damage (US$)	Deaths	Ref(s).
Adrian	June 11–19	Category 1 hurricane	85 (130)	979	None	None	None	
Beatriz	June 18–20	Tropical storm	65 (100)	995	Southwestern Mexico	Unknown	6	
Three-E	June 27 – July 2	Tropical depression	35 (55)	1006	Southwestern Mexico, Baja California Peninsula	None	None	
Calvin	July 4–9	Category 2 hurricane	110 (175)	966	Western Mexico, Baja California Sur	$32 million	37	
Dora	July 14–20	Category 4 hurricane	130 (215)	945	None	None	None	
Eugene	July 15–25	Category 3 hurricane	125 (205)	948	Hawaii	Minimal	1	
Keoni	August 9–19	Category 4 hurricane	130 (215)	942	None	None	None	
Fernanda	August 9–19	Category 4 hurricane	145 (230)	934	Hawaiian Islands	$5 million	None	
Greg	August 15–28	Category 4 hurricane	130 (215)	948	None	None	None	
Hilary	August 17–27	Category 3 hurricane	120 (195)	957	Baja California Peninsula, California, Iowa	Minimal	None	
Irwin	August 21–22	Tropical storm	70 (110)	999	Southwestern Mexico	None	None	
Jova	August 29 – September 5	Category 4 hurricane	130 (215)	948	Southwestern Mexico	None	None	
Kenneth	September 5–17	Category 4 hurricane	150 (240)	932	None	None	None	
Lidia	September 8–14	Category 4 hurricane	150 (240)	930	Southwestern Mexico, California	$8 million	6 (1)	
Fourteen-E	September 21–25	Tropical depression	35 (55)	1002	Southwestern Mexico	None	None	
Max	September 30 – October 4	Tropical storm	45 (75)	1000	None	None	None	
Norma	October 2–6	Tropical storm	50 (85)	1000	None	None	None	
Seventeen-E	October 11–14	Tropical depression	35 (55)	1009	None	None	None	
Season aggregates
18 systems	June 11 – October 14		150 (240)	930		$45 million	50 (1)	

== See also ==
- List of Pacific hurricanes
- Pacific hurricane season
- 1993 Atlantic hurricane season
- 1993 Pacific typhoon season
- 1993 North Indian Ocean cyclone season
- South-West Indian Ocean cyclone season: 1992–93, 1993–94
- Australian region cyclone season: 1992–93, 1993–94
- South Pacific cyclone season: 1992–93, 1993–94
