= Adaran =

Adaran or Aderan (Persian: ادران) may refer to:

- Adaran, Alborz
- Adaran, Tehran
- Adaran Rural District, in Alborz Province
- Ādarān (or Ātash Ādarān), a grade of Zoroastrian holy fire
