= Adrian, U.S. Virgin Islands =

Neighborhood on the island of Saint John, U.S. Virgin Islands

Coordinates: 18°20′29″N 64°46′06″W

Adrian is a neighborhood on the island of Saint John in the United States Virgin Islands. Much of this area is part of Virgin Islands National Park. The Catherineburg Sugar Mill Ruins are in Adrian. The only grove of bamboo on St. John can be found here, to the east of John Head Road.
