= Ardian Pepa =

Albanian sculptor and painter (born 1977)

Ardian Pepa (born 2 March 1977, in Fushë-Arrëz) is an Albanian sculptor and painter. He graduated with a degree in sculpture from Tirana's Academy of Arts in 2001.

== Work Experience and Exhibitions ==
- Participant in the Contemporary Art Fair at the International Center of Culture "Pjetër Arbnori", Tirana. (2006)
- Participant in the national competition "Skanderbeg".(2005)
- Director of Scenography for the realization of the play Marie Kraja. (2005)
- Scenography and realization of the scenes of "Miss Dea" theater "Byllis" Fier. (2005)
- Stage scenographer for "Miss Albania 2005" event held at Kaninë Castle of Vlora. (2005)
- Collective exhibition "Blic" in ICC-Tirana. (2003)
- Personal exhibition M.H.K "tendencies. (2003)
- Personal exhibition in the gallery of the Foundation "Velia". Broad thematic material of wood, metal, marble, alabaster, plaster, ceramics and drawing 33 works. (2002)
- Personal exhibition "Plus" in the Gallery of the Academy of Arts works in wood, metal, marble, alabaster, plaster, and various drawings. (2001)
- "Fight for Life" against AIDS Day December 1, in the gallery of the Academy of Arts. (2001)
- "Start" exhibition organized by the "Soros" with two jobs (wood and stone). In the Gallery of the Academy of Arts. (2001)
- Exhibition organized by the Orthodox Church in the Gallery of the Academy of Arts of Tirana. (2000)
