= Ardian =

Ardian may refer to:

- Ardian (company), is a private equity investment firm (formerly Axa Private Equity)
- Ardian (given name), Albanian given name
- Ardian, Iran, a village in Semnan Province, Iran
- A proposed rank for Air Marshal in the Royal Air Force
- Ardian, a character in the book The Letter for the King
