= Adrian High School =

Adrian High School may refer to the following schools in the United States:

- Adrian High School (Michigan), Adrian, Michigan
- Adrian Middle/High School, Adrian, Minnesota
- Adrian High School (Missouri), Adrian, Missouri
- Adrian High School (Oregon), Adrian, Oregon
- Adrian High School (Texas), Adrian, Texas

== See also ==
- Adrian C. Wilcox High School, Santa Clara, California
