= Adrienne (disambiguation) =

Adrienne is a feminine given name.

Adrienne may also refer to:

- French frigate Adrienne (1809)
- Adrienne (painting), a 1919 painting by Gustave Van de Woestijne
- "Adrienne" (song), by The Calling
- "Adrienne", a 1971 single by Tommy James
