= Tropical Storm Cindy (1993) =

Atlantic tropical cyclone

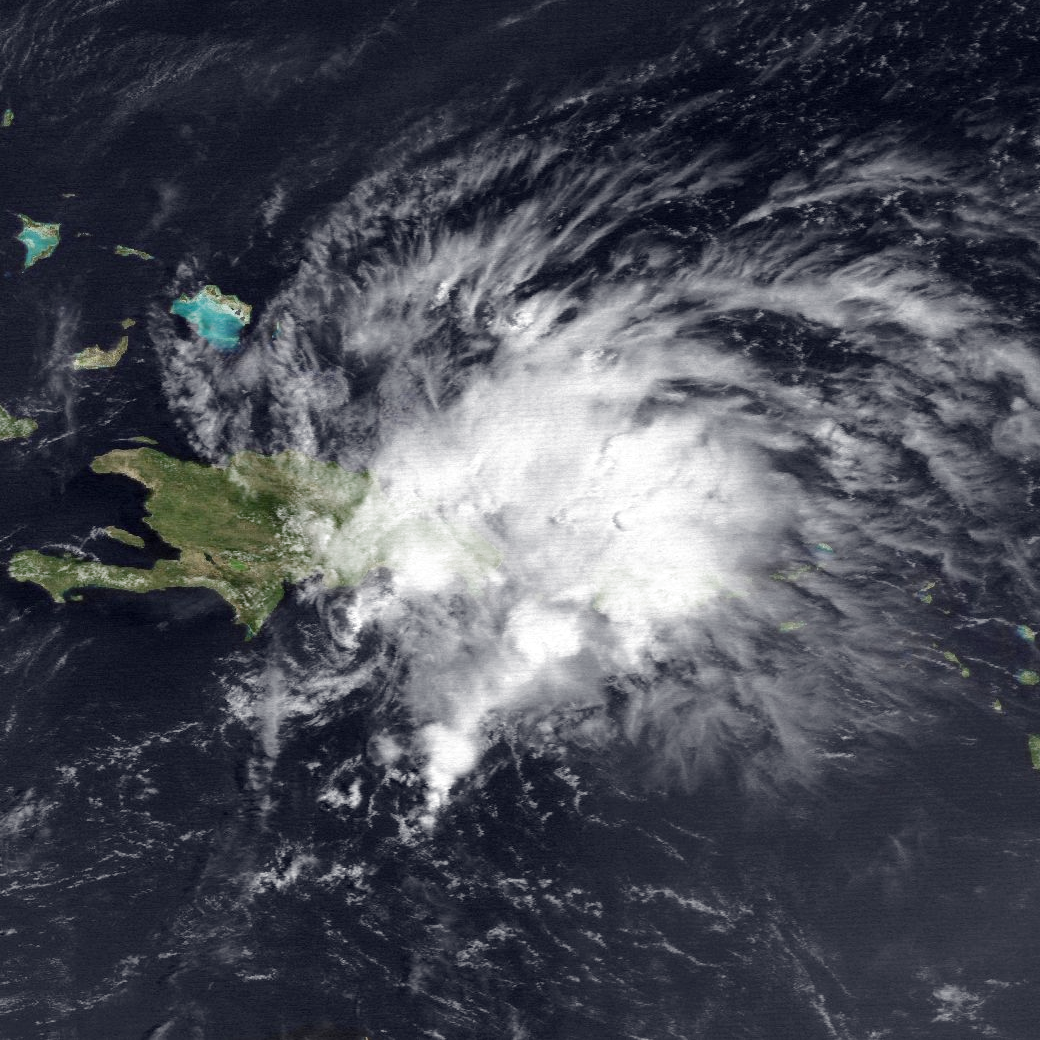
- Tropical Storm Cindy making landfall on the island of Hispaniola on August 16

Meteorological history
- Formed: August 14, 1993
- Dissipated: August 17, 1993

Tropical storm
- 1-minute sustained (SSHWS/NWS)
- Highest winds: 45 mph (75 km/h)
- Lowest pressure: 1007 mbar (hPa); 29.74 inHg

Overall effects
- Fatalities: 4 total
- Damage: $19 million (1993 USD)
- Areas affected: Lesser Antilles (Martinique), Dominican Republic, Puerto Rico
- IBTrACS
- Part of the 1993 Atlantic hurricane season

Tropical Storm Cindy was a weak but unusually wet Atlantic tropical cyclone that caused disastrous floods and mudslides across Martinique in August 1993. Cindy formed east of the island and became the annual hurricane season's third named storm on August 14. Due to unfavorable atmospheric conditions, Cindy remained disorganized throughout its journey across the northeastern Caribbean Sea. After attaining maximum sustained winds of 45 mph (72 km/h), the storm began to weaken from an interaction with the high terrain of Hispaniola. It made landfall in the Dominican Republic as a tropical depression on August 16, and dissipated over the territory the following day.

Despite its poor cloud structure, Cindy dropped torrential rain over portions of the northeastern Caribbean. The island of Martinique received a record 12 inches (300 mm) of rain over a 24-hour period, causing severe river flooding throughout northern villages and communes. Le Prêcheur was particularly devastated by an extensive debris flow, which dragged away entire structures. The storm wrought $19 million (1993 USD) in damage across Martinique, and left two people dead and hundreds homeless on the island. En route to Hispaniola, Cindy affected the Virgin Islands and Puerto Rico with rough surf and moderate rain. Heavy downpours and flooding killed two people in the Dominican Republic, though the exact extent of the damage there is unknown.

== Meteorological history ==
Map plotting the storm's track and intensity, according to the Saffir–Simpson scale Map key Saffir–Simpson scale Tropical depression (≤38 mph, ≤62 km/h) Tropical storm (39–73 mph, 63–118 km/h) Category 1 (74–95 mph, 119–153 km/h) Category 2 (96–110 mph, 154–177 km/h) Category 3 (111–129 mph, 178–208 km/h) Category 4 (130–156 mph, 209–251 km/h) Category 5 (≥157 mph, ≥252 km/h) Unknown Storm type Tropical cyclone Subtropical cyclone Extratropical cyclone, remnant low, tropical disturbance, or monsoon depression

The origins of Tropical Storm Cindy can be traced to a tropical wave that departed the western coast of Africa on August 8, 1993. Over the following days, the wave tracked steadily west-northwestward across the tropical Atlantic, maintaining a distinct cloud pattern on satellite imagery. Although data from a reconnaissance aircraft mission on August 13 indicated that the system lacked a defined wind circulation, a second mission at 12:00 UTC the next day revealed an improvement in its structure at the lower levels of the atmosphere. The National Hurricane Center (NHC) thus classified the system as a tropical depression—a tropical cyclone with sustained winds of less than 39 mph (63 km/h)—and initiated public advisories on it soon thereafter.

Steered by mid- to low-level winds, the depression continued west-northwest toward Martinique and slowed as it encountered the island's northern mountain range. By the afternoon of August 14, satellite imagery showed a developing central dense overcast, likely enhanced by greater turbulence over the rugged terrain; the next reconnaissance flight revealed that wind speeds near the center had increased to gale force. Based on these observations, the NHC upgraded the depression to Tropical Storm Cindy around 18:00 UTC, at which time the cyclone was located over Martinique with winds of 40 mph (65 km). Although Cindy briefly developed a favorable outflow, its upper-level structure deteriorated after it moved away from the Lesser Antilles, impeding further development. Unfavorable wind shear throughout August 15 kept Cindy's cloud pattern disorganized; the center of circulation became ill-defined, with the strongest thunderstorms confined to the eastern portion of the cyclone. Despite these conditions, the storm strengthened slightly on August 16, attaining peak winds of 45 mph (72 km/h) and a minimum pressure of 1007 mbar (hPa; 29.74 inHg), roughly 85 mi (137 km) southeast of Santo Domingo.

After peaking in strength, Cindy began to interact with the mountains of Hispaniola. The high terrain disrupted its circulation, causing the storm to weaken to a tropical depression at 21:00 UTC on August 16. The depression made landfall near Barahona, Dominican Republic, with winds of 35 mph (56 km/h). The circulation became increasingly diffuse over land, prompting the NHC to declassify Cindy on August 17. The remnants proceeded inland near the border with Haiti and emerged into the Atlantic, where they spread across the Bahamas before dissipating the next day.

== Preparations ==
When Cindy became a tropical cyclone on August 14, tropical storm warnings were issued for the Lesser Antilles from Martinique northward to the Virgin Islands. A tropical storm watch was posted for Puerto Rico at the time. As Cindy drifted farther north on August 15, the watch for Puerto Rico was upgraded to a tropical storm warning. Officials issued flash flood warnings for parts of the island, and about 600 people living in flood-prone areas sought shelter ahead of the storm. Ferry service between Fajardo and the offshore islands of Culebra and Vieques was suspended, leaving about 400 passengers stranded for a day. A price freeze was placed on emergency supplies such as wood, nails, batteries, kerosene, and lanterns.

On August 15, a tropical storm warning was issued for the Dominican Republic, from Samaná to Cabo Engaño along the northern coast and westward to Isla Beata off the southwestern coast. Thousands of residents stocked up on bottled water, canned goods, and gas, although many stores in and around the capital remained closed for the day. The Santo Domingo International Airport suspended all flight operations on the morning of August 16. The tropical storm warning for the island was discontinued when Cindy made landfall as no more than a weak tropical depression. In Cuba, a storm alert was issued for eastern provinces as forecasters warned of possibly heavy rainfall.

== Impact ==
Wettest tropical cyclones and their remnants in Martinique Highest-known totals
Precipitation			Storm	Location	Ref.
Rank	mm	in	Storm	Location	Ref.
1	680.7	26.80	Dorothy 1970	Fourniols	
2	567.0	22.32	Klaus 1990	Le Morne-Rouge	
3	475.0	18.07	Beulah 1967	Les Anses-d'Arlets	
4	450.1	17.72	Iris 1995	Ducos	
5	349.0	13.74	David 1979	Saint-Joseph	
6	332.0	13.07	Dean 2007	Fort-de-France	
7	305.0	12.01	Cindy 1993	Le Prêcheur	
8	301.5	11.87	Edith 1963	Saint-Pierre	
9	280.0	11.02	Allen 1980	Grand-Rivière	
10	230.1	9.059	Marilyn 1995	Le Morne-Rouge	

=== Martinique ===
On August 14, Cindy passed over Martinique with brisk winds and particularly intense rainfall, amplified by the storm's interaction with the island’s rising terrain. Rainfall was heaviest to the northeast of a line between Sainte-Marie and Fort-de-France, where all weather stations recorded more than 4 in (100 mm) in a single day. The highest 1- and 24-hour rainfall rates were observed in Le Prêcheur, measuring 5.79 and 12.0 in (147 and 305 mm), respectively. These amounts far exceeded the September average of 9.29 in (236 mm), making Cindy one of the most extreme rain events in the island's history. Wind gusts reached 40 mph (64 km/h), though sustained onshore winds remained below tropical storm force.

Initially, Cindy's winds downed banana trees and power lines across northern Martinique. After hours of continuous rain, several rivers within the island’s extensive watershed—including the Rivière des Pères, Rivière Claire and Rivière Sèche—rapidly swelled and overflowed. Severe flooding and mudslides swept through northern villages, submerging homes and destroying roads and bridges. The extent of the flooding was revealed on national television, showing "cars [being] swept away to sea and buried in mud".

The Prêcheur River, which normally flows at 18 ft^{3}/s (0.5 m^{3}/s), burst its banks upon attaining an exceptional discharge rate of nearly 25,000 ft^{3}/s (700 m^{3}/s). As a result, volcanic material from the riverbed coalesced into a massive debris flow that struck the small commune of Le Prêcheur. The deposited sediment reached heights of up to 10 ft (3.0 m), engulfing the houses and roads and inflicting an estimated ₣15 million (1993 value; $2.7 million in 1993 USD) in structural damage. Flash floods also surged through the village of Grand'Rivière when its river overflowed, devastating property and drowning one person. Despite recent improvements to its flood defenses, the Rivière Roxelane rapidly topped its banks and inundated much of Saint-Pierre. Farther south, torrential rainfall combined with poorly maintained storm drains to flood private property and an aquafarm in Le Morne-Vert.

==== Aftermath ====
Overall, Cindy killed 2 people, injured 11, and destroyed more than 150 homes across Martinique. Monetary losses reached ₣107 million ($19 million), with road damage comprising ₣68 million ($12 million). In the storm's wake, thousands on the island sought refuge in emergency shelters, and approximately 3,000 residents became homeless. Relief supplies were delivered to Fort-de-France by La Capricieuse, a French Navy ship stationed in French Guiana; the goods included 250 packages of clothing distributed by the Lions Club Association of Saint Barthélemy. Unseasonable sea conditions following Cindy hindered local fishers from selling their catch to trading vessels in Petite Martinique. In response to the severe flooding, waterways and harbors were dredged across Martinique, and riverbanks and dykes were reinforced to prevent recurrence.

=== Other islands in the Lesser Antilles ===
Minimal effects were felt elsewhere in the Lesser Antilles. In Guadeloupe, the storm dropped rain across southern Basse-Terre Island through August 14–15; a peak total of 9.02 in (229 mm) was recorded at the summit of La Grande Soufrière. Wind gusts at Raizet Airport reached 38 mph (61 km/h), just below tropical storm force. A moderate breeze with 28 mph (45 km/h) gusts brushed Dominica, and 1.25 in (32 mm) of rain fell at Canefield Airport within 24 hours of Cindy's passage. Farther south, a weather station in Saint Lucia recorded 1.88 in (48 mm) of precipitation, as well as light winds. As Cindy passed south of the Virgin Islands, unsettled seas caused minor beach erosion along the islands' southern shores, with swells of 4 to 5 ft (1.2 to 1.5 m) reported at Saint Croix. Onshore, the island experienced wind gusts to 35 mph (56 km/h) and 1.48 in (38 mm) of rainfall.

=== Greater Antilles ===
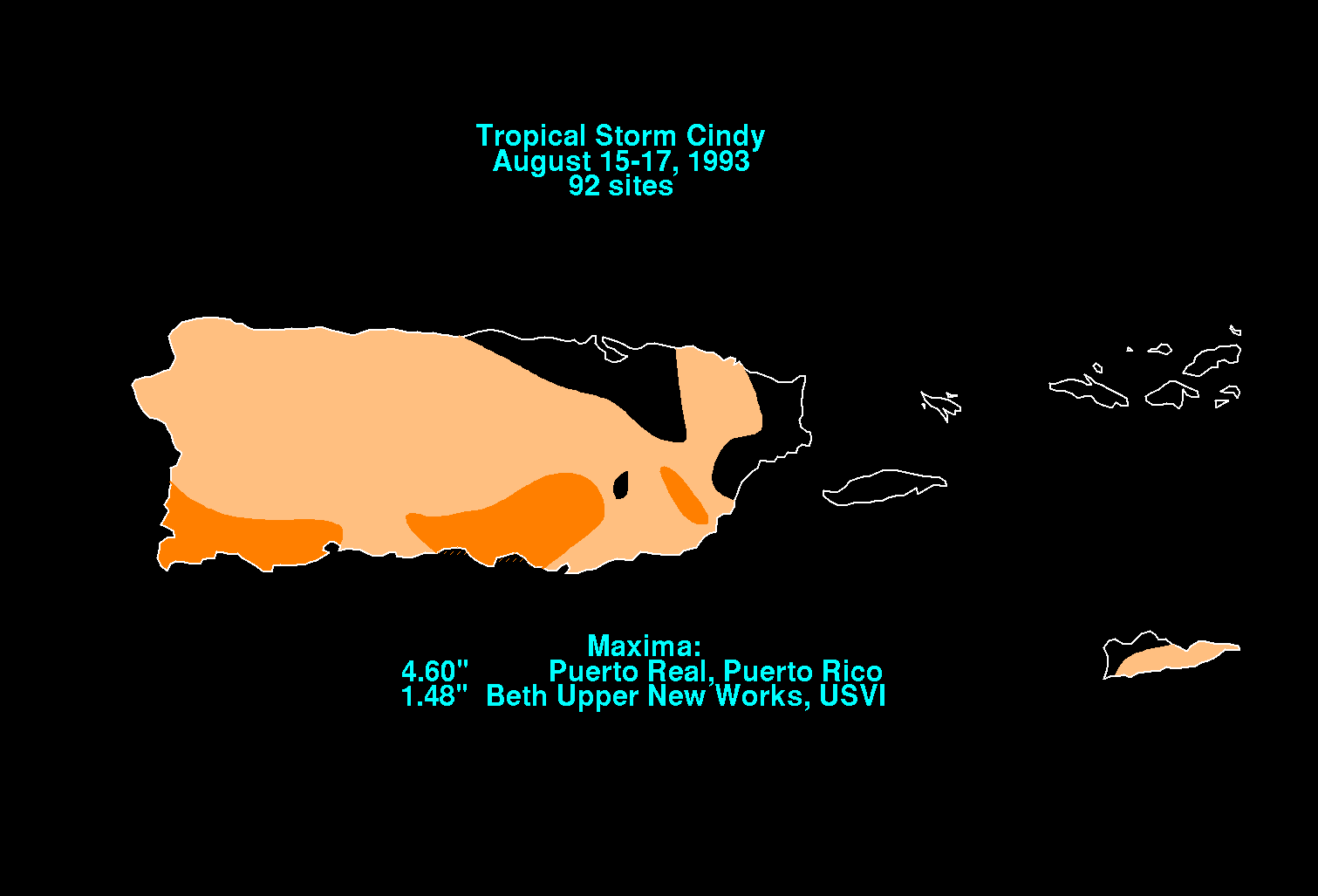
Puerto Rico rainfall map of Cindy from the WPC

On August 16, Cindy made its closest point of approach to Puerto Rico, although its center remained well south of the island. Impact from the storm was therefore limited to intermittent downpours and 8 ft (2.4 m) waves along the southern coast. The rough seas caused some minor erosion to beach facilities. According to a report from the United States Geological Survey (USGS), a maximum of 5.54 in (141 mm) of rain fell near Río Cerrillos in Ponce; the highest measurement from the Weather Prediction Center (WPC) was 4.60 in (117 mm) at Puerto Real in Cabo Rojo. Many other locations received rainfall amounts of 2.0–4.5 in (51–114 mm), which flooded some roads and low-lying areas.

Cindy brought considerable rainfall to southern and eastern parts of the Dominican Republic, with totals of 4–10 in (100–250 mm). Upon the storm's landfall in the country, winds reached 35 mph (56 km/h) in Barahona. The rain filled rivers and caused scattered street flooding, affecting hundreds of houses. In Villa Altagracia, one fatality occurred when a child drowned in flood waters; the final death toll for the country stood at two. There were no reports of damage elsewhere after Cindy's rapid demise over Hispaniola, though its remnants likely produced localized showers in Haiti.

== See also ==
- Other storms named Cindy
- List of wettest tropical cyclones by country
- Tropical Storm Erika
