= Pilote (disambiguation) =

Pilote was a French comics magazine.

Pilote can also refer to:

== People ==
- Pilote (musician) (born 1970), British musician
- Pilote (name), middle name and surname

== Other uses ==
- French for aircraft pilot or maritime pilot
- Rivière Pilote, river in Martinique

- Rivière-Pilote, commune surrounding the river

- Canton of Rivière-Pilote, former canton coterminous with the commune

- HMS Pilote, cutter for the French Navy and the Royal Navy

== See also ==
- Pilot (disambiguation)
