= Samuel Campbell Rowley =

Royal Navy officer and politician

Rear-Admiral Samuel Campbell Rowley
- Born: 19 January 1774; Drumsna, County Leitrim
- Died: 28 January 1846 (aged 72) Drumsna, County Leitrim
- Allegiance: Great Britain; United Kingdom
- Branch: Royal Navy
- Rank: Rear-Admiral
- Conflicts: French Revolutionary Wars; Battle of Martinique; Invasion of Guadeloupe; First Battle of Copenhagen

Rear-Admiral Samuel Campbell Rowley was a Royal Navy officer and politician. Rowley attended the Royal Naval Academy at Portsmouth in 1785 and joined his first ship in March 1789, serving in the West Indies. He passed the lieutenant's examination in 1792 but was not promoted until January 1794, when he joined HMS Vengeance. In her, Rowley took part in the West Indies campaign under Sir John Jervis and Sir Charles Grey, and was present at the capture of Martinique, St Lucia and Guadeloupe. Rowley returned to England at the beginning of 1795 and shortly after, was appointed to the 32-gun HMS Astraea, serving in the English Channel, where, on 10 April 1795, he assisted in the taking of the French 42-gun frigate, Gloire.

Rowley was promoted to Master and Commander of the bomb vessel HMS Terror in 1799 and fought in her at the Battle of Copenhagen in 1801. He made post-captain on 29 April 1802 and on 14 February 1811, commissioned HMS Laurel for service in the English Channel. While entering Quiberon Bay on 12 January 1812, Laurel hit the rocks and was wrecked. A subsequent court martial absolved Rowley of blame.

Rowley represented the constituency of Kinsale in the last Irish Parliament before the union with Great Britain and was after, elected to the Westminster Parliament, where he served until 1806. Rowley's first wife, whom he married on 16 September 1805, died in 1821. He remarried on 4 November 1830 but neither union resulted in children. Rowley was promoted to Rear Admiral on 10 January 1837 and died on 28 January 1846

== Early life and career ==
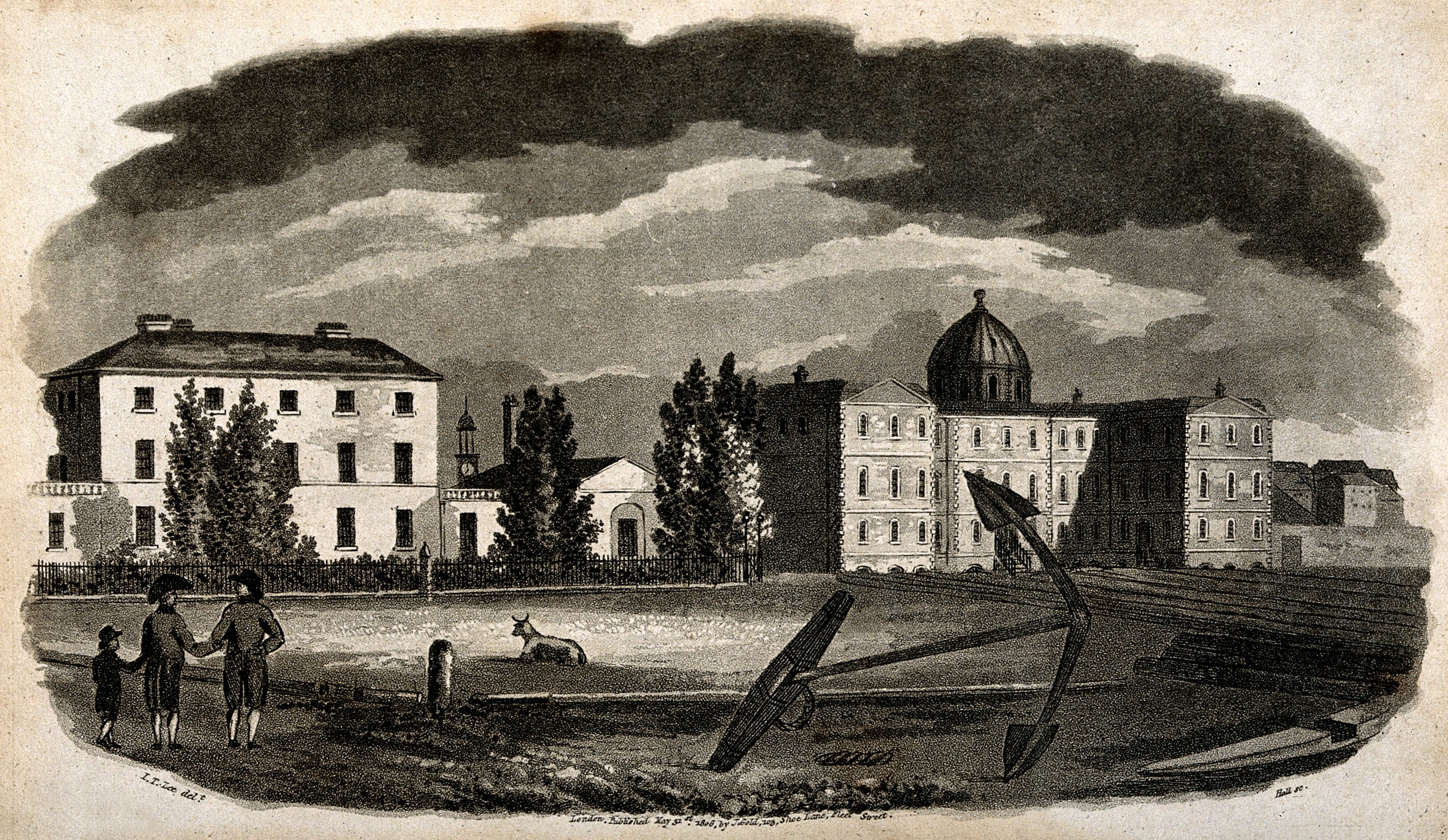
The naval academy at Portsmouth that Rowley attended between 1785 and 1789

Samuel Campbell Rowley was born on 19 January 1774 in Drumsna, County Leitrim, Ireland. He was the third son of Clotworthy Rowley, a barrister and Member of Parliament, and his wife, Letitia. The Rowley's were a naval family, Samuel's paternal grandfather was Admiral of the Fleet Sir William Rowley. His older brother, Josias Rowley, and his first cousin, Charles Rowley would also become Admirals in the Royal Navy.

In 1785, Rowley attended the Royal Naval Academy at Portsmouth. On 10 March 1789, he joined the 32-gun HMS Blonde on the West Indies Station and remained aboard her for the next three and a half years. Rowley passed his lieutenant's examination in 1792 but was not immediately promoted. From 1793, he served in succession, aboard HMS Alligator, HMS Sceptre and HMS Boyne, before his appointment as lieutenant aboard the 74-gun HMS Vengeance, on 30 January 1794.

=== West Indies campaign ===
Painting by William Anderson, depicting the landing of troops on Martinique, on 20 March 1794

Rowley took part in the West Indies campaign under Sir John Jervis and Sir Charles Grey, helping to secure the islands of Martinique, St Lucia and Guadeloupe. The expedition, comprising 19 vessels, including Vengeance, and 7,000 men, left Barbados on 2 February and arrived off Martinique four days later. Troops were put ashore at the Bay of Galion, Case de Navire and Sainte Luce, and by 16 March had all the island, save two forts, under control. Following a naval bombardment and an assault, the last French troops capitulated on 22 March.

On 31 March, Rowley was part of a force sent to capture St Lucia. Casualties of battle, sickness and the need to maintain a garrison on Martinique, meant only 4800 troops could be spared but St Lucia was poorly defended. Following his previous strategy, Grey had his troops disembarked at multiple places around the island. The landings were unopposed and with little to do, Jervis' ships anchored in Cul de Sac Bay. The island was secured with the capture of Morne Fortune fort on 4 April.

A small squadron was dispatched to capture the Saintes but Vengeance sailed with Jervis' main fleet to Guadeloupe, arriving in Gosier Bay on 10 April. Troops landed over the next two days, quickly gained control of the island of Grande-Terre. Leaving a regiment to garrison the fort at Pointe-a-Pitre, the British crossed the water on 14 April but it was not until 22 April that the French fully relinquished their hold on the island of Basse-Terre.

The British occupation of Guadeloupe did not go unchallenged. On 3 June, a French force arrived and began attacking British positions on Basse-Terre. Jervis was made aware of this on 5 June and immediately sent ships to Martinique for reinforcements while he and Grey set off in Boyne with Veteran in company. They reached Guadeloupe on 7 June, where they were joined by Vanguard and Vengeance. Grey landed on Basse-Terre, and Jervis, with the Boyne, Vanguard, Vengeance and Veteran, proceeded off Point-a-Pitre. Additional troops arrived at Grande-Terre on 19 June but the British counter-attack was not successful. Reinforcements from France reached the islands in September and by 10 December, had driven the British from Guadeloupe. After a period serving ashore in the newly acquired territories, Rowley returned to England in early 1795.

=== Gloire ===
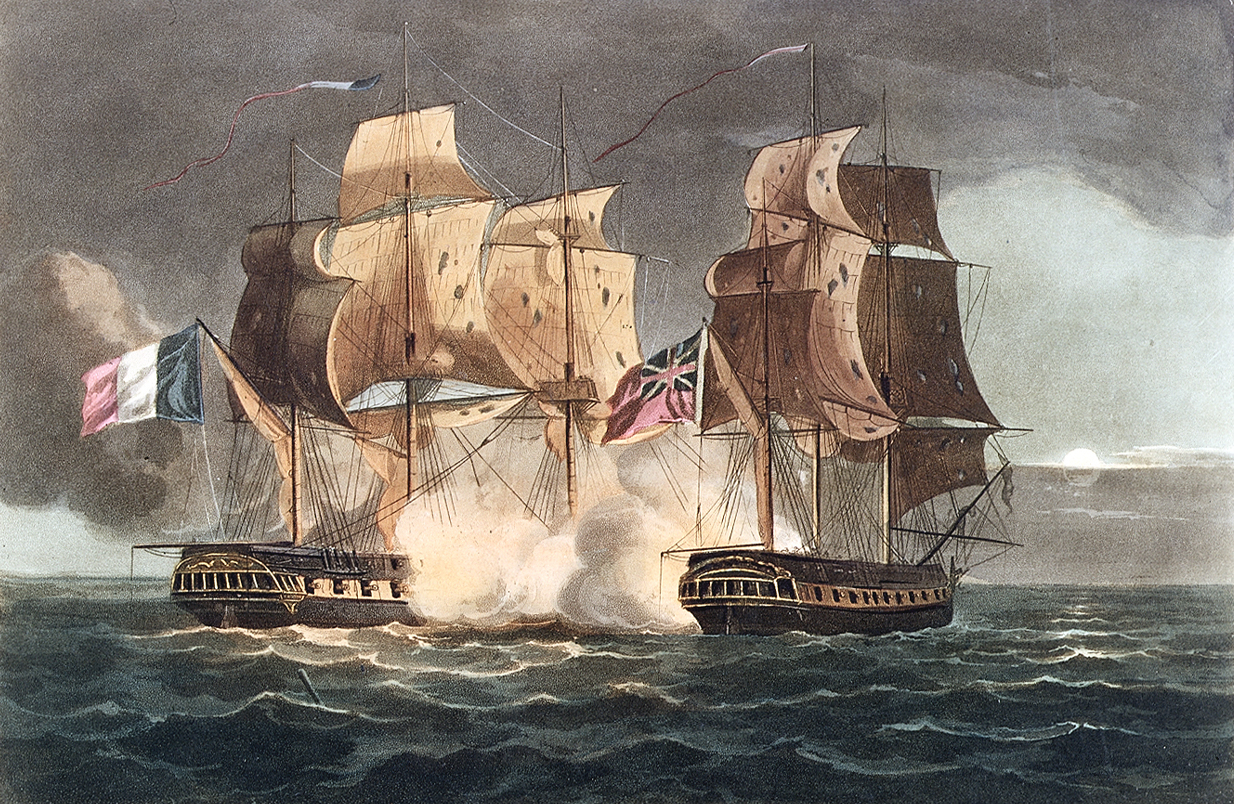
Rowley was aboard HMS Astraea when she engaged and captured the French frigate, Gloire

Shortly after his return home, Rowley was appointed to the 32-gun HMS Astraea, serving in the Channel, where, on 10 April 1795, he assisted in the capture of the French 42-gun frigate, Gloire.

Under the command of Captain Henry Paulet, the frigate Astraea was part of Rear-Admiral John Colpoys' squadron, comprising five ships-of-the-line and three frigates that was blockading the port of Brest. At 10:00 on 10 April, three ships were spotted in the west and Colpoys ordered his ships to investigate. At 12:00 the British were close enough to identify their quarry as French frigates. The French squadron scattered. HMS Hannibal and Robust gave chase to Gentille and Fraternité, while Astraea went after Gloire.

At 18:00, Astraea was close enough to her chase to open fire and a running battle ensued with the British frigate slowly gaining. At 22:30 a close action began which lasted about an hour before Gloire surrendered. French casualties amounted to 40 killed and wounded, compared to five aboard Astraea. The masts and rigging of both ships had been heavily damaged and two hours later, Astraea's main mast snapped.

== Command ==
On 6 April 1799, Rowley was appointed master and commander of HMS Terror. In 1801, Terror was sent to the Baltic with a large force, under Admiral Sir Hyde Parker, to disrupt the league of armed neutrality, and took part in the attack on Copenhagen on 2 April. Following an inspection of its defences and a council of war, Vice-admiral Horatio Nelson was awarded a squadron to attack the city. Terror was one of seven bomb vessels that Nelson had anchor outside the British line, off the large shoal known as the Middelgrund, from where they could throw their shells over the top, into the city. The fighting lasted for more than five hours, after which Denmark agreed to suspend its armed neutrality and open its ports to British shipping.

Following petitioning from his brother, an influential naval captain and politician, Rowley was promoted to post-captain on 29 April 1802. He was without a ship during the peace of Amiens, and for some time after, until 7 January 1811, when he boarded the 74-gun HMS Venerable, anchored at Spithead. This was a brief appointment, lasting only until 14 February, when Rowley commissioned HMS Laurel for service in the Channel. The 36-gun frigate was formerly Fidele, a French prize captured during the attack on Vlissingen in 1809. In her, Rowley made a return trip to St Helena, before she was wrecked in Quiberon Bay on 12 January 1812.

=== Loss of the Laurel ===
In low light and stormy seas, while taking the Teigneuse Passage, Laurel hit the Govivas Rocks. Rowley tried to prevent his ship from sliding off into deep water by deploying her anchors but the situation was worsened when the sudden halting of the Laurel broke off part of her keel. Rowley was left with no option but cut his cables and run for the shore. Laurel grounded with water up to the quarterdeck; the force of the collision snapping her masts and throwing the boats and guns overboard. Under fire from a nearby fort, Rowley evacuated his crew. Around 200 were picked up by British ships but 96 were taken prisoner.

=== Later career and death ===
Rowley was court martialled for the loss of Laurel on 19 February 1812 but was exonerated. From 24 March 1815, until the end of the year, he was the captain aboard his brother's flagship, the first-rate HMS Impregnable, in the Mediterranean. On 28 September 1818, Rowley was again appointed as his brother's flag captain, this time in HMS Spencer while she was a guardship at Cork. Rowley commanded HMS Wellesley from 15 September 1830, until she was paid off at the beginning of 1832.

Rowley was promoted to Rear Admiral on 10 January 1837. He died at the family home where he was born, on 28 January 1846, at the age of 72.

== Political career ==
In 1797 Rowley embarked upon a political career, following in the footsteps of his father and older brother, although his life at sea probably kept him from attending frequently. He represented the constituency of Kinsale in the last Irish Parliament before the union with Great Britain which, despite his allegiance, he initially voted against. He was subsequently elected to the Westminster Parliament, where he served until 1806.

In February 1801, his father was given the position of commissioner of compensation and Rowley replaced him as Member of Downpatrick. At the following general election, Rowley took over as Member for Kinsale, when his brother resigned.

On 4 March 1803, Rowley voted against an inquiry into the Prince of Wales's finances, following the government line. Although the evidence suggests that Rowley always voted with the government and, in December 1804, was listed as "pro government", in July, he was recorded as being in "opposition". Political historian Arthur Aspinall suggests there may have been some confusion due to Rowley's extended absences.

In 1819, Rowley was given the freedom of the city of Cork.

== Marriage ==
On 16 September 1805, Rowley married his first wife, Mary Thompson from County Fermanagh. She died in 1821. Rowley remarried on 4 November 1830, to Mary Frances Cronyn of County Kilkenny. Neither union produced children.
