= Rivière Falaise =

River in Martinique

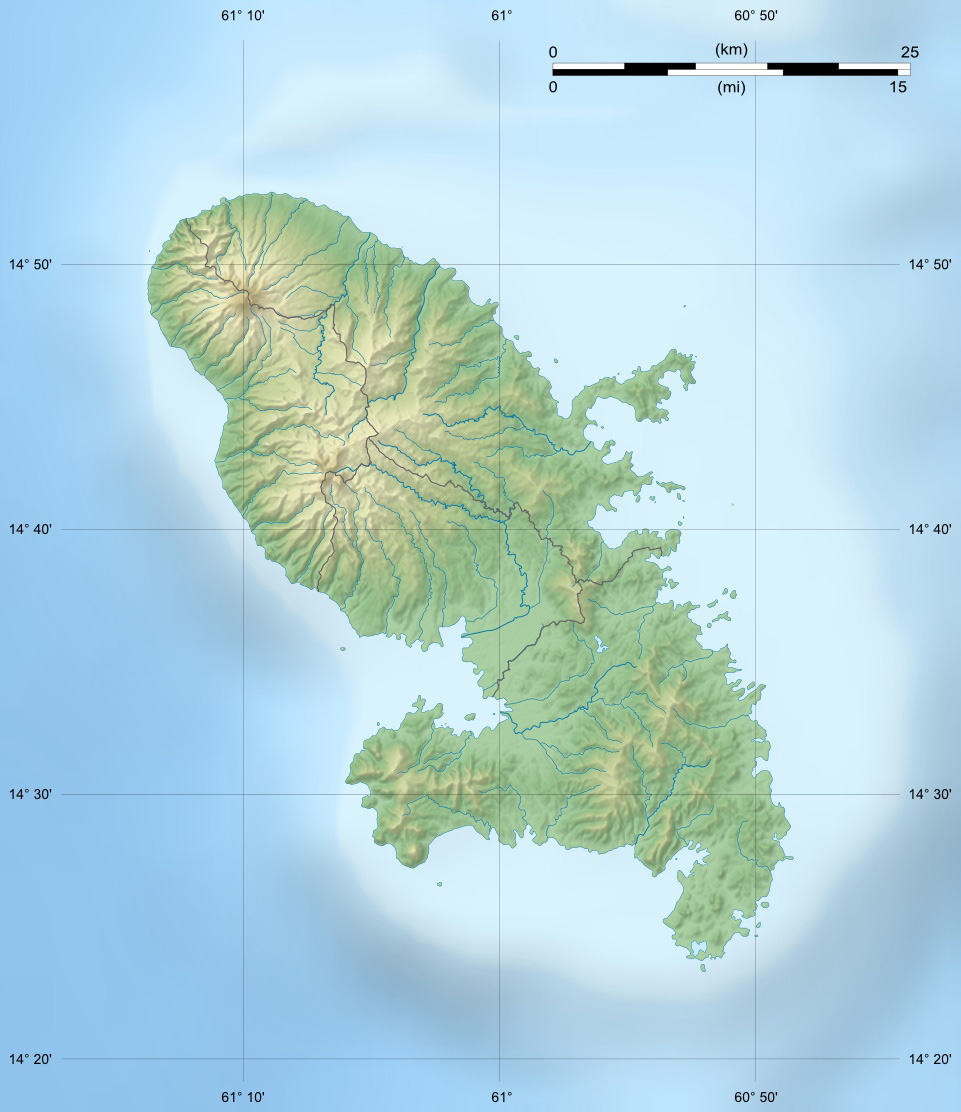
- Location of mouth

Location
- Country: France
- Region: Martinique

Physical characteristics
- Mouth: Rivière Capot
  - coordinates: 14.8315°N 61.0971°W
- Length: 9.4 km (5.8 mi)

Basin features
- Progression: Rivière Capot→ Caribbean Sea

The Rivière Falaise is a river of Martinique. It flows into the Rivière Capot near L'Ajoupa-Bouillon. It is 9.4 km (5.8 mi) long.

== See also ==
- List of rivers of Martinique
