= Rivière du Lorrain =

River in Martinique

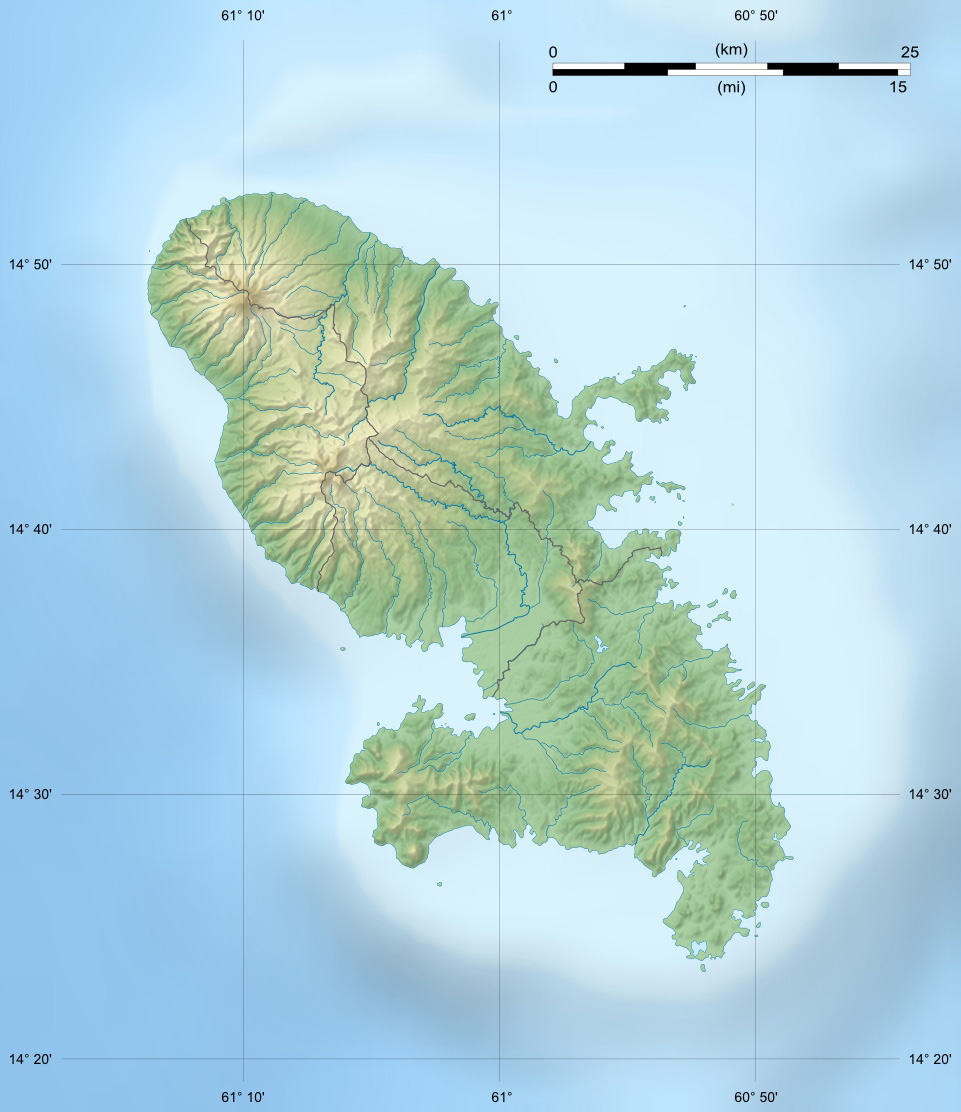
- Location of mouth

Location
- Country: France
- Region: Martinique

Physical characteristics
- Mouth: Caribbean Sea
  - coordinates: 14.8321°N 61.0396°W
- Length: 18.4 km (11.4 mi)

The Rivière du Lorrain is a river of Martinique. It flows into the Caribbean Sea near Le Lorrain. It is 18.4 km (11.4 mi) long. The river valley of Lorrain is a popular site for hiking and picnics.

== See also ==
- List of rivers of Martinique
