= Hurricane Cindy (2005) =

Category 1 Atlantic hurricane in 2005

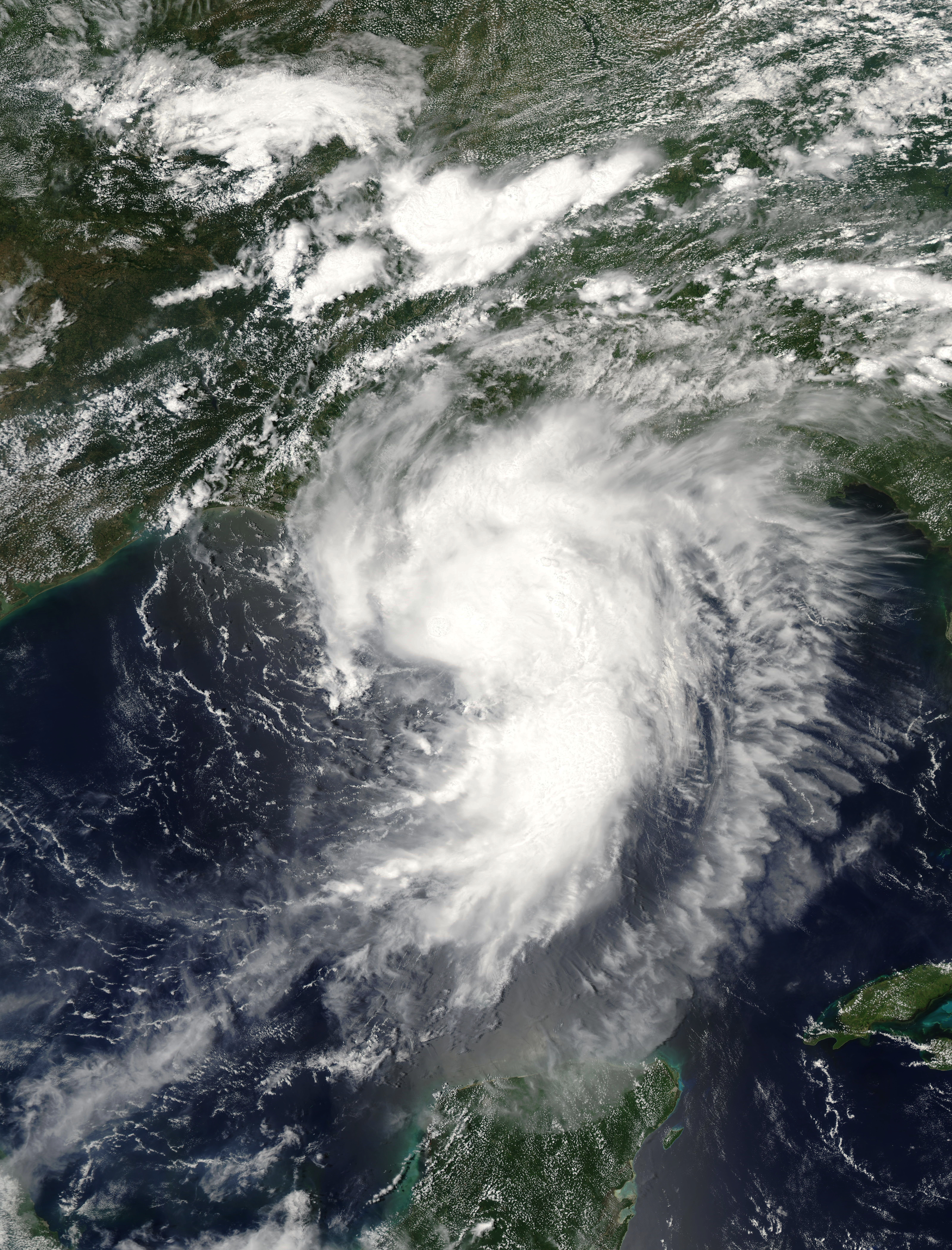
- Cindy shortly before reaching hurricane intensity south of New Orleans on July 5

Meteorological history
- Formed: July 3, 2005
- Extratropical: July 7, 2005
- Dissipated: July 12, 2005

Category 1 hurricane
- 1-minute sustained (SSHWS/NWS)
- Highest winds: 75 mph (120 km/h)
- Lowest pressure: 991 mbar (hPa); 29.26 inHg

Overall effects
- Fatalities: 6
- Damage: $320 million (2005 USD)
- Areas affected: Yucatán Peninsula, East Coast of the United States, Atlantic Canada
- IBTrACS
- Part of the 2005 Atlantic hurricane season

Hurricane Cindy was a tropical cyclone that struck the U.S. state of Louisiana in July 2005. The third named storm and first of a record-breaking fifteen hurricanes in the 2005 Atlantic hurricane season, Cindy developed from a tropical wave on July 3, off the east coast of Mexico's Yucatán Peninsula. Soon after, it moved over land before emerging into the Gulf of Mexico. Cindy tracked toward the northern Gulf Coast and strengthened to reach maximum sustained winds of 75 mph (120 km/h), making it a Category 1 on the Saffir–Simpson scale. The hurricane made landfall near Grand Isle, Louisiana, on July 5 at peak intensity, but weakened by the time it made a second landfall along southern Mississippi. Cindy weakened over the southeastern United States and transitioned into an extratropical cyclone as it merged with a cold front on July 7. The remnants of Cindy produced an outbreak of 42 tornadoes across six states. Eventually, the remnants of Cindy moved into Atlantic Canada, dissipating on July 13 over the Gulf of St. Lawrence.

Along its path, Cindy produced heavy rainfall, causing flooding and contributing to six traffic deaths – one in Alabama, two in Georgia, and three in Maryland. The hurricane's damage was estimated at US$320 million, (Note: All damage totals are in 2005 United States dollars) and was significant enough for five Louisiana parishes to be declared federal disaster areas. Along the Gulf Coast, Cindy produced high tides, causing beach erosion and flooding that closed some roads. The storm caused the most extensive power outage in the New Orleans area since Hurricane Betsy in 1965. The tornado outbreak associated with Cindy spawned several strong tornadoes, including an F2 tornado in Hampton, Georgia, that caused US$70 million in damage. The damage shut down the Atlanta Motor Speedway for two months. Another F2 tornado in North Carolina destroyed a dairy barn and damaged several buildings. Rainfall from the storm extended into the Mid-Atlantic, causing water rescues in Virginia and Pennsylvania. On July 9, the remnants of the storm set a rainfall record in Montpelier, Vermont, when its airport recorded 2.15 in (55 mm) of precipitation. Many of the areas affected by Cindy were struck by hurricanes Dennis and Katrina in the following weeks.

== Meteorological history ==
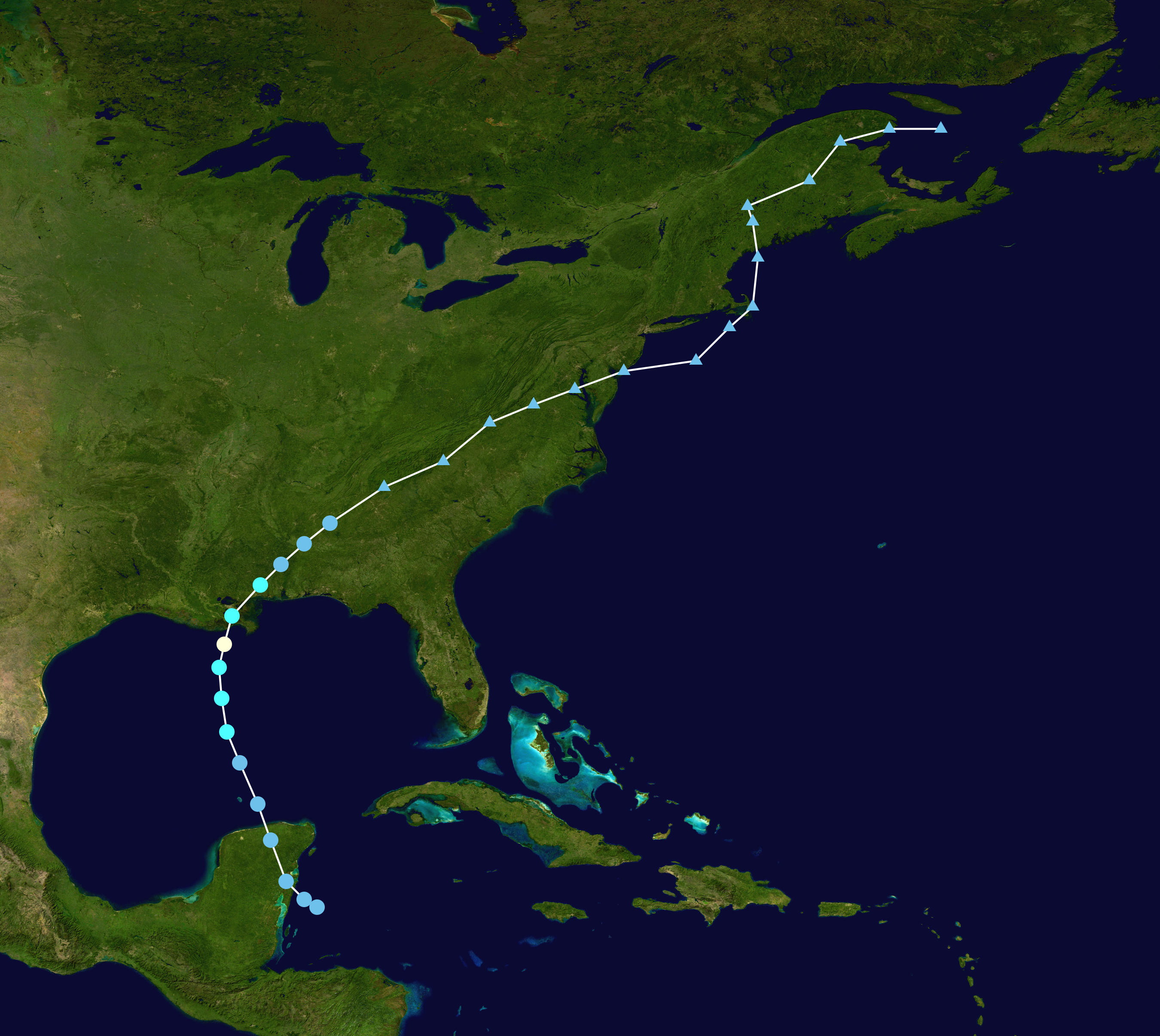
Map plotting the storm's track and intensity, according to the Saffir–Simpson scale Map key Saffir–Simpson scale Tropical depression (≤38 mph, ≤62 km/h) Tropical storm (39–73 mph, 63–118 km/h) Category 1 (74–95 mph, 119–153 km/h) Category 2 (96–110 mph, 154–177 km/h) Category 3 (111–129 mph, 178–208 km/h) Category 4 (130–156 mph, 209–251 km/h) Category 5 (≥157 mph, ≥252 km/h) Unknown Storm type Tropical cyclone Subtropical cyclone Extratropical cyclone, remnant low, tropical disturbance, or monsoon depression

The origins of Hurricane Cindy were from a tropical wave that exited the west coast of Africa on June 24. The wave moved quickly westward across the Atlantic without much development until June 28. On that day, an area of convection, or thunderstorms, formed near the Lesser Antilles. The wave continued westward across the Caribbean and was first included in the Tropical Weather Outlook (TWO) by the National Hurricane Center (NHC) on June 30. A day later, the convection became more concentrated and organized to the southeast of Jamaica. The flow of southeasterly winds from South America also contributed to tropical cyclone formation. Late on July 3, the system developed into Tropical Depression Three about 80 mi (130 km) east of Mexico's Yucatán Peninsula. Steered by a ridge to its north, the depression continued west-northwestward and moved ashore near Mahahual early on July 4.

Once over land, the circulation became elongated, with a secondary circulation forming along the northern coast of the Yucatán. At that time, tropical cyclone forecast models had conflicting predictions for the system. Some anticipated little to no development, resulting in a weaker system moving toward northeastern Mexico or southern Texas. Other computer models anticipated a strengthening storm that would turn to the north toward Louisiana. The depression emerged into the Gulf of Mexico late on July 4, where the thunderstorms organized into rainbands and an outflow pattern. On July 5, the depression intensified into Tropical Storm Cindy, as the circulation became better defined. By the time Cindy became a tropical storm, it was moving northward toward southern Louisiana, steered by a mid-level trough moving through the southeastern United States. Due to an anticipated reduction in wind shear, the NHC forecast that Cindy would intensify to an estimated peak intensity of 50 mph (85 km/h). Cindy intensified more than expected as it turned northeastward.

Although its structure was asymmetrical at first, the storm developed an eye feature as the winds increased. Early on July 6, Cindy attained hurricane status just offshore Louisiana. Around 03:00 UTC that day it made landfall in southeastern Louisiana near Grand Isle. Operationally, the NHC assessed it as a strong tropical storm when Cindy moved ashore, although the agency upgraded it after the season due to a reanalysis of radar-derived winds. The hurricane weakened to tropical storm status over land, and at 09:00 UTC that day, Cindy made its final landfall near Waveland, Mississippi, with 50 mph (85 km/h) winds. It quickly weakened into a tropical depression and merged with a stationary front on July 7, becoming an extratropical cyclone. The remnants continued northeastward across the southeastern United States, emerging into the western Atlantic on July 8 off the mid-Atlantic coast. The extratropical cyclone restrengthened slightly, passing near Nantucket before moving ashore in Maine on July 9. After moving over Atlantic Canada, the remnants of Cindy dissipated over the Gulf of St. Lawrence on July 11.

== Preparations ==
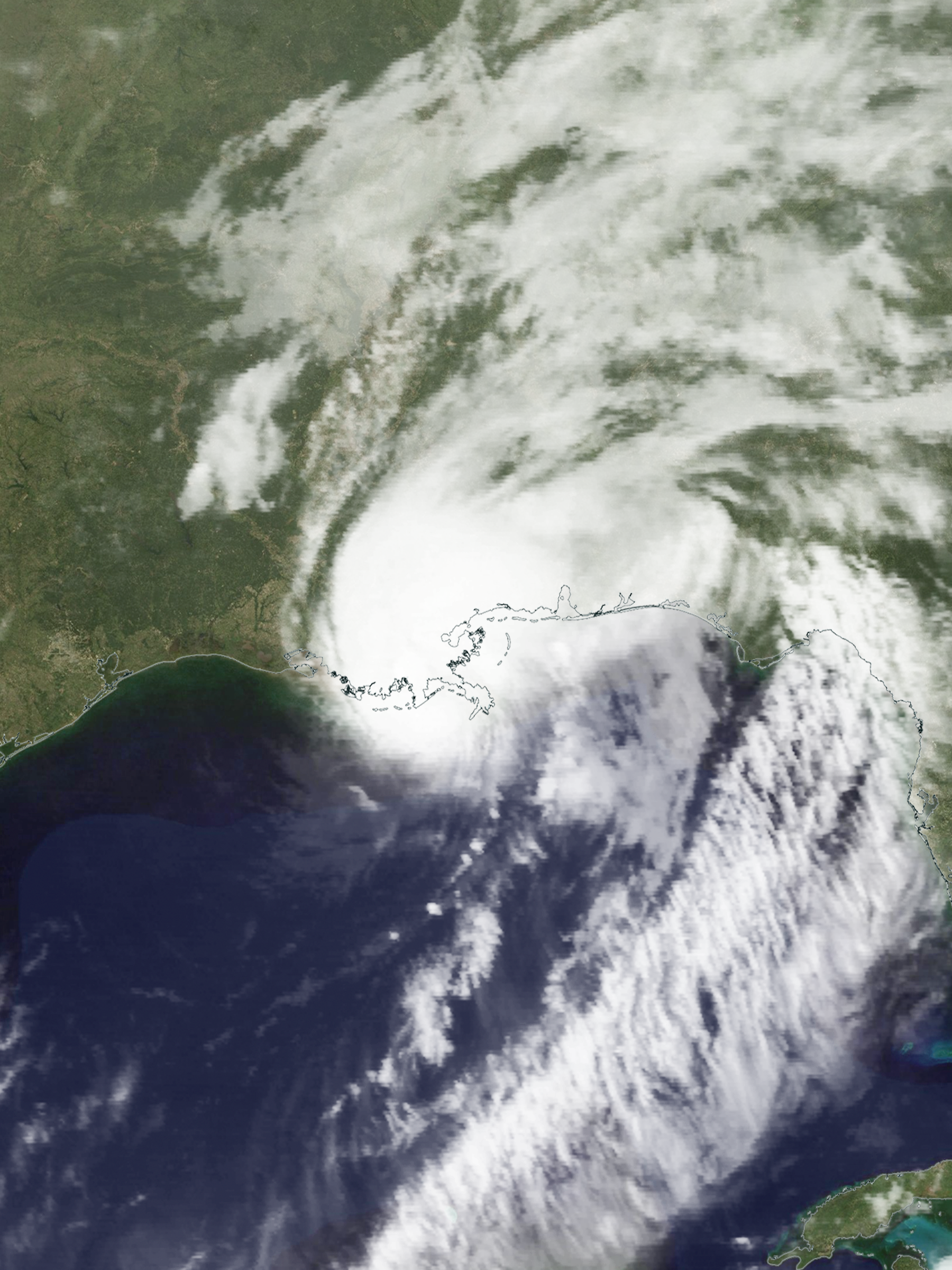
Hurricane Cindy making landfall in Louisiana on July 6

Upon Cindy's formation as a tropical depression, the government of Mexico issued a tropical storm warning from Punta Allen to Chetumal. The NHC later issued tropical storm warnings for the northern Gulf Coast between Intracoastal City, Louisiana, and Destin, Florida. Because it was not forecast to intensify into a hurricane, the NHC did not issue hurricane warnings. Oil companies evacuated employees from six oil rigs and 23 petroleum production platforms offshore in the open Gulf of Mexico. The price of oil rose to $60.10 a barrel due to the disruptions from the storm. In New Orleans, both the Louis Armstrong International Airport and Amtrak temporarily suspended regular air and train service, respectively. Recreational vehicles were told to leave Grand Isle in case a full-scale evacuation was needed. Officials in Lafourche and Plaquemines parishes advised residents to evacuate if they were not protected by levees. In Mississippi, jail inmates filled sandbags, which would be distributed to flood-prone areas throughout the state. In Mobile County, Alabama, summer schools were closed during the storm.

== Impact ==
In its formative stages, Cindy produced heavy rainfall across the Yucatán Peninsula, with a peak 24-hour rainfall total of 2.8 in (71 mm) recorded in Cancún. The effects were greatest in the United States, where Cindy's damage was estimated at US$320 million. As it moved ashore, the hurricane affected the coastal areas of the northern Gulf of Mexico with a storm surge, or rise in water, with a maximum reading of 6.20 ft (1.89 m) recorded at Ocean Springs, Mississippi, and a maximum tidal reading of 7.1 ft (2.2 m) recorded at Fort Morgan, Alabama. New Orleans's Lakefront Airport recorded gale-force winds for five and a half hours, with a maximum gust of 70 mph (113 km/h). An offshore oil rig, the South Timbalier, recorded wind gusts of 100 mph (161 km/h). Cindy produced rainfall from Louisiana to as far northeast as Maine. Across the southeastern United States, Cindy's strong winds knocked down trees and power lines, affecting about 278,000 people across New Orleans, as well as 35,000 residences in Alabama and 7,000 in both Florida and Mississippi. Six deaths were attributed to Cindy, all related to vehicle accidents. A driver in Tibbie, Alabama, crashed after losing control on rain-slick roads. A driver in Peachtree City, Georgia, drowned in a ditch, and a driver on Interstate 20 hydroplaned and crashed. Two people died in Frederick County, Maryland, when their vehicle struck a guardrail during heavy rainfall. A driver died in Crownsville, Maryland, after crashing into a fallen tree.

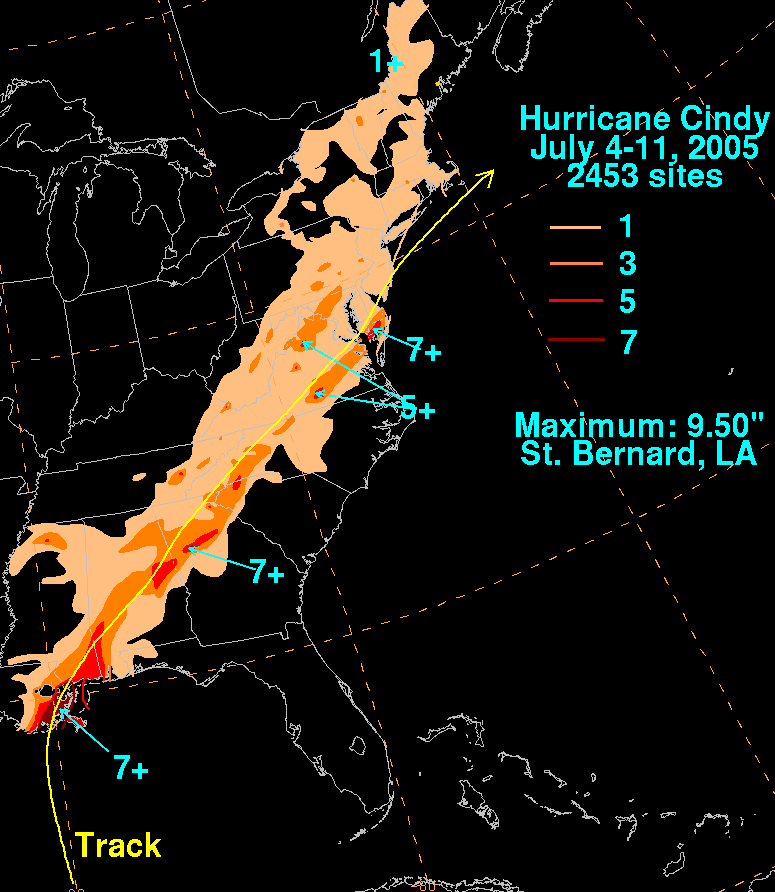
Map showing rainfall totals across the eastern United States

The heaviest rainfall occurred in St. Bernard Parish, Louisiana, which recorded a total of 9.50 in (241 mm). Across southeastern Louisiana, Cindy left at least $50 million in damage, mostly related to its winds knocking down trees and power lines. Much of New Orleans was without power; streets were flooded and covered with debris. Across the city, 650 properties requested assistance removing trees; City Park lost at least 50 trees. Downed wires sparked a fire at an abandoned building in eastern New Orleans. In Grand Isle where Cindy moved ashore, high tides caused some beach erosion and strong winds caused roofing damage. Also in the city, the high winds ruptured two gas lines. Six fishing trawlers struck the Louisiana Highway 1 bridge at Leeville, causing it to close temporarily.

Elsewhere along the Gulf Coast, Cindy produced flash flooding and coastal flooding across southern Mississippi and Alabama, and tidal flooding in western Dauphin Island. High tides closed the Battleship Parkway in Mobile Bay for a few hours. In Montgomery, floodwaters damaged a business. The storm produced beach erosion as far east as Walton County, Florida. A strong band of thunderstorms moved into western Georgia, producing flash floods across six counties that swelled creeks and washed out a few roads. Hartsfield-Jackson Atlanta International Airport recorded 5.14 in (131 mm), which was its sixth-highest one-day rainfall ever recorded. In northern Atlanta, the Peachtree Creek crested at 19 ft (5.8 m), which is 2 ft (0.61 m) above flood stage; the floodwaters affected a golf course and a few nearby homes. A driver in Upson County was injured after driving into a washed-out road. Motorists in Peachtree City and Fayetteville became stranded by flooded roads. Near Fayetteville, the rains collapsed the roof of a house and a gas station canopy. Due to the rain, the Atlanta Braves game against the Chicago Cubs was postponed. In Villa Rica, the rains caused a sinkhole, which trapped a delivery vehicle for several hours. In Lawrenceville, a sinkhole developed due to the storm, destroying a driveway.

As the remnants of the storm continued northeastward, it produced heavy rainfall. Statewide precipitation peaks included 5.52 in (140 mm) near Cleveland, South Carolina, 5.27 in (134 mm) at Tryon, North Carolina, and 5.18 in (132 mm) in Lenoir City, Tennessee. In western North Carolina, the rains led to mudslides, one of which damaged a volunteer fire department building. Flooding occurred across eastern Tennessee. In northern Virginia, floodwaters closed roads and businesses in Arlington, and a driver in Loudoun County required rescuing. In Sykesville, Maryland, two people were injured after skidding and striking a tree. Heavy rains developed a sinkhole along the Baltimore–Washington Parkway near Laurel, which backed up the local roads used as detours for about 2 mi (3.2 km). About 18,000 people across the Washington metropolitan area lost power. The heaviest rainfall in Maryland was 5.63 in (143 mm), recorded at Salisbury. There was an unconfirmed tornado in Cockeysville, Maryland, which damaged a few trees. In northern Delaware, heavy rainfall and 30 mph (48 km/h) wind gusts knocked down trees, leaving about 100 homes without power. In Pennsylvania, rains from the storm generated flash floods in Lebanon and Lancaster counties, leading to water rescues after drivers were stranded in floodwaters. In Lebanon County, the floods forced 22 homes to evacuate. Across the Lehigh Valley, about 4,600 homes lost power after trees were knocked into power lines, and a portion of PA 309 was closed for five hours. In Logan Township, New Jersey, flooding created a 30 ft (9.1 m) break along a levee, requiring emergency repairs. The combination of rains and gusty winds knocked down trees as far north as Franklin County, New York, some of which caused roofing damage. Near Montpelier, Vermont, the Edward F. Knapp State Airport set a daily rainfall record on July 9 when it received 2.15 in (55 mm) of precipitation.

=== Tornado outbreak ===
Confirmed tornadoes by Fujita rating
FU	F0	F1	F2	F3	F4	F5	Total
0	24	15	3	0	0	0	42

Over three days, Cindy produced a tornado outbreak across the southeastern United States. Most of the tornadoes occurred early on July 6, when the storm was weakening inland and starting to experience wind shear from an approaching trough. On that day alone, the National Weather Service issued 67 tornado warnings, setting a single-day record in July for the most warnings; the record was broken by Hurricane Beryl in 2024.

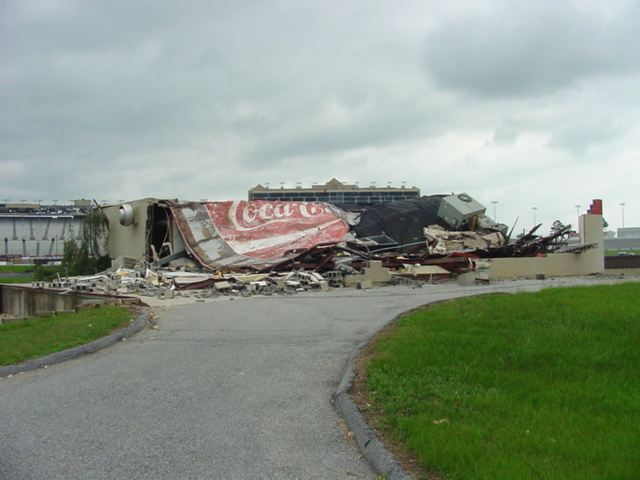
Collapsed building at the Atlanta Motor Speedway as a result of a tornado spawned by Cindy

The most damaging event occurred in Georgia. At 01:45 UTC on July 7, (Note: 7:45 pm EDT July 6) a large tornado touched down at the Atlanta Motor Speedway in Hampton in Henry County. Measuring 0.5 mi (0.80 km) in diameter, the tornado caused heavy damage at the speedway, such as knocking down a 50 ft (15 m) scoreboard and damaging facilities at the venue. The racetrack was covered with debris, although was not directly damaged. Nearby, the tornado destroyed a gas station and shattered many windows of a nine-story condominium, as well as damaging the structure's roof. The winds were estimated at 120 to 150 mph (190 to 240 km/h), making it an F2 on the Fujita scale. The tornado was on the ground for 19 minutes, which immediately brought its path over Tara Field, where it heavily damaged eleven planes and five vintage helicopters, as well as two hangars. The tornado knocked down trees and power lines, causing damage to nearby homes and leaving much of Henry County without power. Later the tornado moved through the Edgar Blalock Raw Water Reservation, narrowing its width as it moved into Clayton County. After a 9 mi (14 km) path, the tornado lifted at 02:04 UTC. (Note: 8:04 pm EDT) The tornado caused about $70 million in damage, of which about $40 million was at the Atlanta Motor Speedway, airport, and nearby facilities. Due to the extent of the damage, the speedway was closed until mid-September when it reopened for a motorsports event.

The tornado outbreak began in Alabama on July 6 at 09:00 UTC. (Note: 5:00 am EDT) The first event was an F0 tornado in Mobile County, which was on the ground for about three minutes, during which a few homes and outbuildings sustained roof damage. Several trees were also knocked down by the tornado. It was the first of 15 tornadoes in the state, all of which but two were rated an F0. An F1 tornado touched down north of Autaugaville, which damaged an outbuilding and knocked down several trees, with damage estimated at $14,000. Another F1 tornado hit northwest of Tuskegee, which destroyed an automobile repair shop, injuring a man who was flung out of the building. The tornado also damaged three vehicles due to fallen trees, with damage estimated at $48,000. The remaining F0 tornadoes were mostly weak and short-lived, their main impacts being downed trees or power lines. There was an F0 tornado in Montgomery County that remained on the ground for eight minutes, and for a path of 7.6 mi (12.2 km). It severely damaged a baseball complex and blew down trees; the tornado's cost was estimated at $22,000. There was also an F0 tornado that took a 5.6 mi (9.0 km) path between Macon and Elmore counties, during which it damaged a few roofs.

There were three tornadoes in the Florida panhandle, all short-lived and rated as an F0. One of the tornadoes touched down just south of the state line in Okaloosa County, which crossed the border into Covington County, Alabama. The tornado inflicted $30,000 worth of damage from downed trees and power lines. There were six tornadoes in Georgia, including the damaging event at the Atlanta Motor Speedway. One was rated an F1, which was on the ground for 14 minutes through mostly rural areas. It caused $25,000 in damage, mostly downed power lines. An F0 tornado hit southeast of Fayetteville, which knocked down hundreds of trees despite being on the ground for only two minutes. The tornado caused $1.95 million in damage to buildings and businesses. A tornado touched down near I-75 West McDonough, damaging a church and several homes, with damage estimated at $150,000. There was also an F0 tornado in Meriwether County, which damaged two buildings and a vehicle.

The outbreak continued into the Carolinas. In South Carolina, a waterspout developed over Lake Hartwell, which damaged docks and about a dozen sailboats, one of which was thrown 100 yd (91 m). It moved ashore and became an F1 tornado, which knocked down trees. Although only on the ground briefly, the tornado caused $150,000 in damage. There was another F1 tornado in the state which touched down touched down just south of the North Carolina/South Carolina border in Spartanburg. After knocking down a few trees, the tornado crossed into North Carolina, where it lifted a mobile home 50 ft (15 m), severely damaging it, and also damaged a barn. Damage was estimated at $50,000. Eight tornadoes touched down in North Carolina, including two rated an F2. The first of these touched down near North Carolina Highway 16 south of Taylorsville. It was on the ground for seven minutes, during which it destroyed a mobile home and severely damaged the roofs of three buildings, with damage estimated at $150,000. Another F2 tornado took an 8.6 mi (13.8 km) path through Iredell and Yadkin counties, lasting 17 minutes. It caused $2.4 million in damage, including a destroyed dairy farm, damaged buildings, and wrecked crops. Also in the state, there were two F1 tornadoes near Yadkinville in short succession, resulting in tree and roofing damage. There were also four F0 tornadoes in the state, which were short-lived and caused light damage to trees and roofs.

There were eight tornadoes in Virginia, all of which were rated an F1. The first of these blew a motor home off its foundation near Ararat. A tornado touched down east of South Hill, which knocked down trees and caused damage to several buildings, including warehouses and barns. A brief tornado near Varina blew the roof off an industrial barn, and another brief tornado near Winterpock damaged a home. Three F1 tornadoes in the state had their impacts limited to downed trees. The final tornado of the outbreak was near Saluda, which blew the roof off a home. It lifted at 07:20 UTC on July 8. (Note: 1:20 am EDT)

== Aftermath ==
Cindy was the first of six hurricanes in 2005 to produce hurricane-force winds in the country, including Dennis a few weeks later, and Katrina in August. The NHC only classified Cindy as a tropical storm while it was active, upgrading it in a post-season analysis in February 2006. Louisiana had its largest power outage since Hurricane Betsy. The energy company Entergy experienced the second-largest power outage to date during Hurricane Cindy, surpassing Hurricane Georges in 1998, only to be greatly surpassed by Katrina a month later. To restore power outages, Entergy brought workers from Texas, Mississippi, and other parts of Louisiana. In five parishes, storm damage was significant enough for President George W. Bush to declare a federal state of emergency on August 23, which allocated money for public assistance and debris removal. During this time, the NHC designated another tropical depression that would later become Hurricane Katrina, which struck southeastern Louisiana on August 29 and severely damaged the same areas affected by Cindy.

== See also ==
- List of Florida hurricanes (2000–present)
- List of North Carolina hurricanes (2000–present)
- List of Category 1 Atlantic hurricanes
- List of storms named Cindy – other storms of the same name
- Hurricane Danny (1997) – the last July hurricane in Louisiana before Cindy
- Hurricane Barry (2019) – the next July hurricane in Louisiana after Cindy
