= Rivière Roche =

River in Martinique

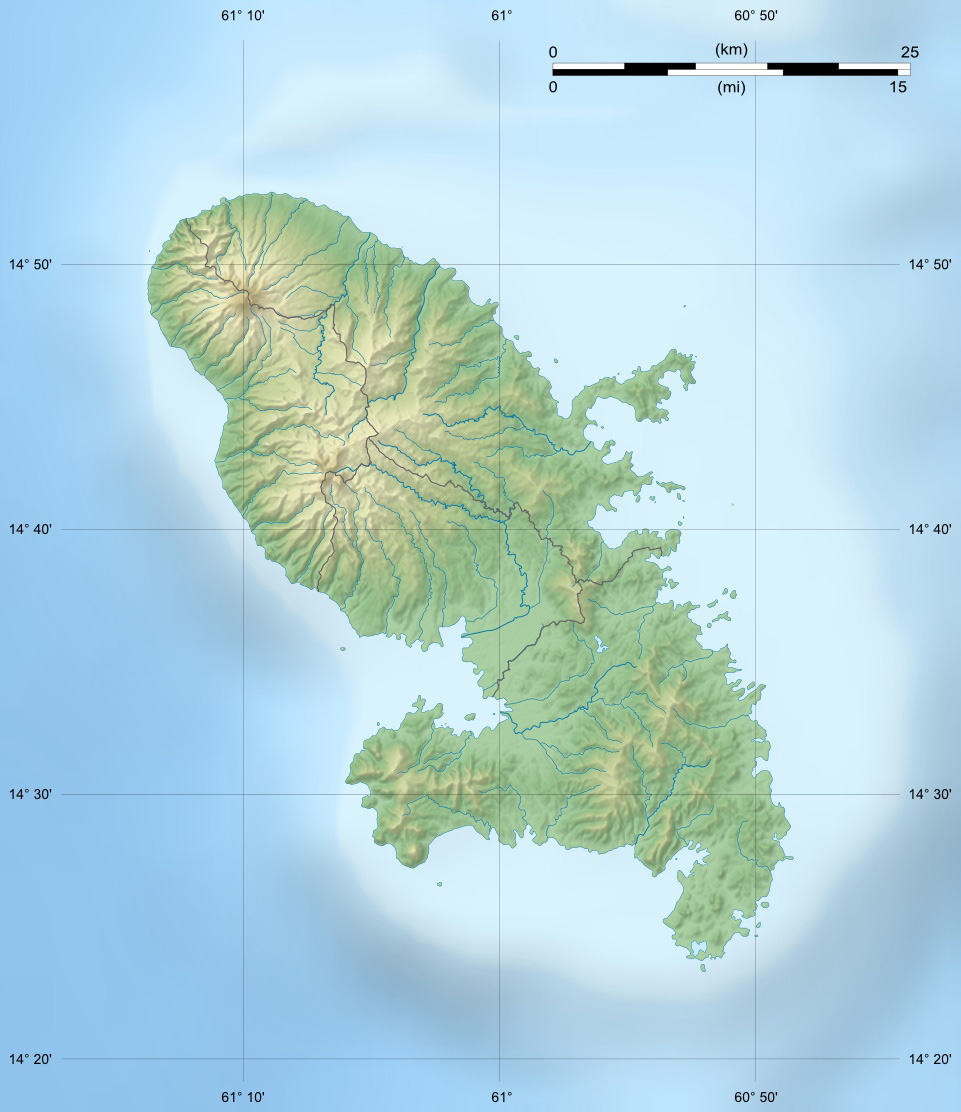
- Location of mouth

Location
- Country: France
- Region: Martinique

Physical characteristics
- Mouth: Caribbean Sea
  - coordinates: 14.8738°N 61.1257°W
- Length: 7.6 km (4.7 mi)

The Rivière Roche is a river of Martinique. It flows into the Caribbean Sea near Basse-Pointe. It is 7.6 km (4.7 mi) long.

== See also ==
- List of rivers of Martinique
