= Rivière Salée =

River in Martinique

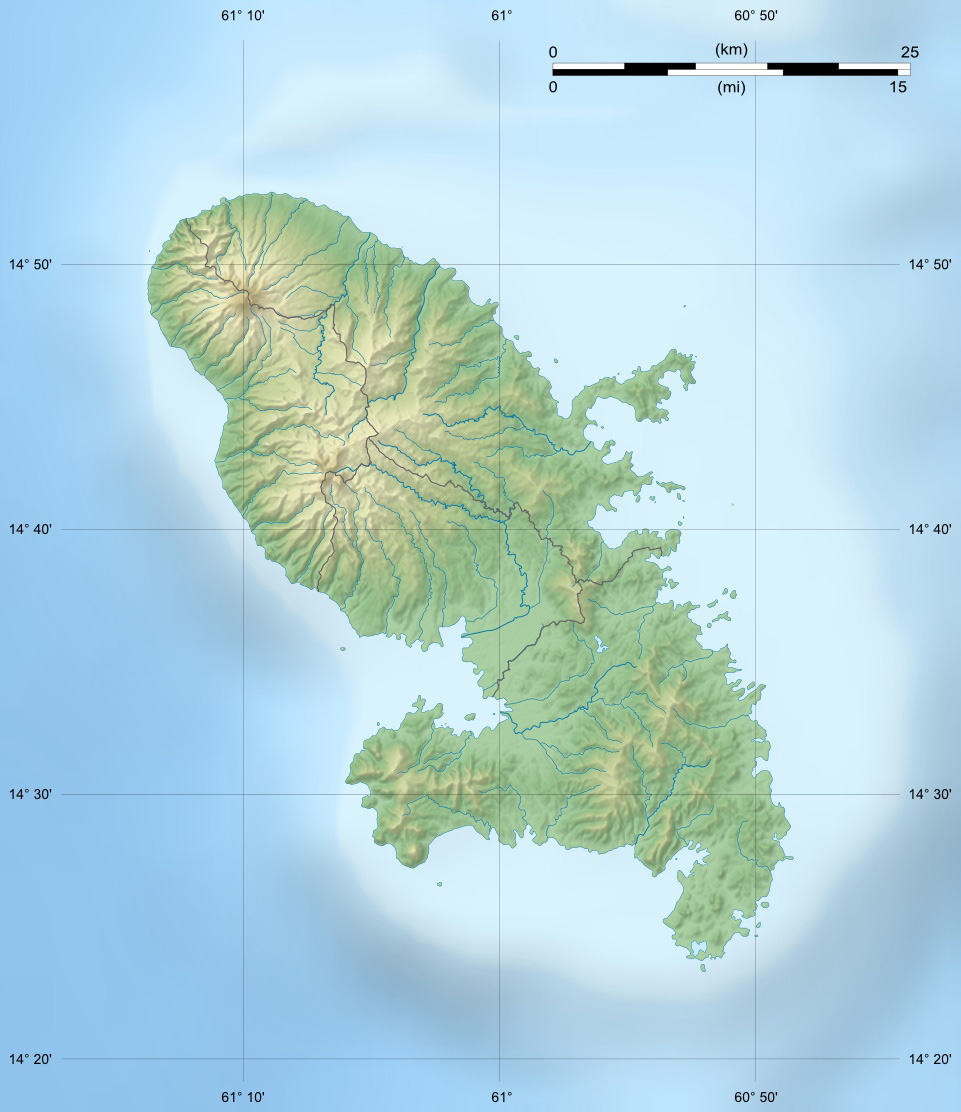
- Location of mouth

Location
- Country: France
- Region: Martinique

Physical characteristics
- Mouth: Caribbean Sea
  - coordinates: 14.5513°N 60.9986°W
- Length: 16.1 km (10.0 mi)

The Rivière Salée (in its upper course: Rivière les Coulisses) is a river of Martinique. It flows into the Caribbean Sea near the town Rivière-Salée. It is 16.1 km (10.0 mi) long.

== See also ==
- List of rivers of Martinique
