= Rivière du Carbet =

River in Martinique

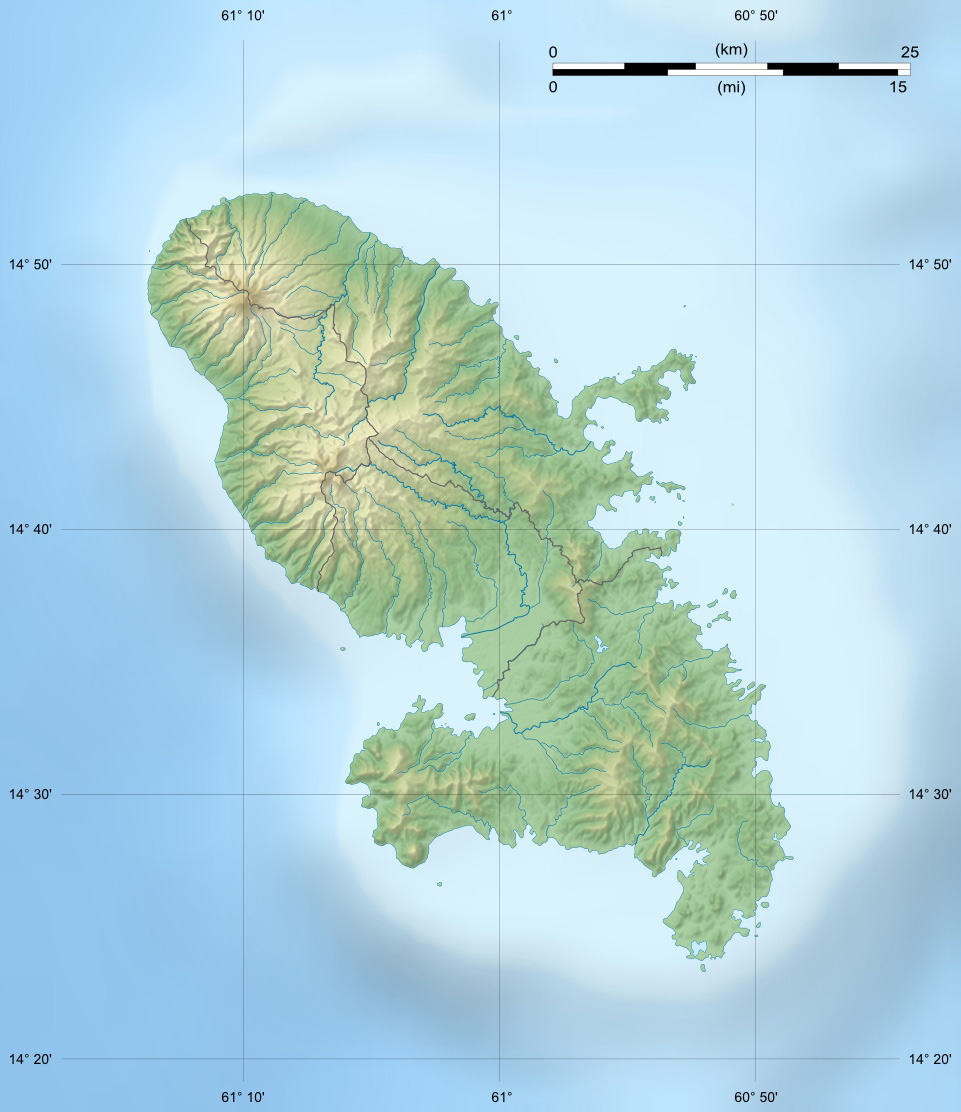
- Location of mouth

Location
- Country: France
- Region: Martinique

Physical characteristics
- Mouth: Caribbean Sea
  - coordinates: 14.7087°N 61.1846°W
- Length: 13.8 km (8.6 mi)

The Rivière du Carbet is a river of Martinique. It flows into the Caribbean Sea in Le Carbet. It is 13.8 km (8.6 mi) long.

== See also ==
- List of rivers of Martinique
