= Rivière Madame =

River in Martinique

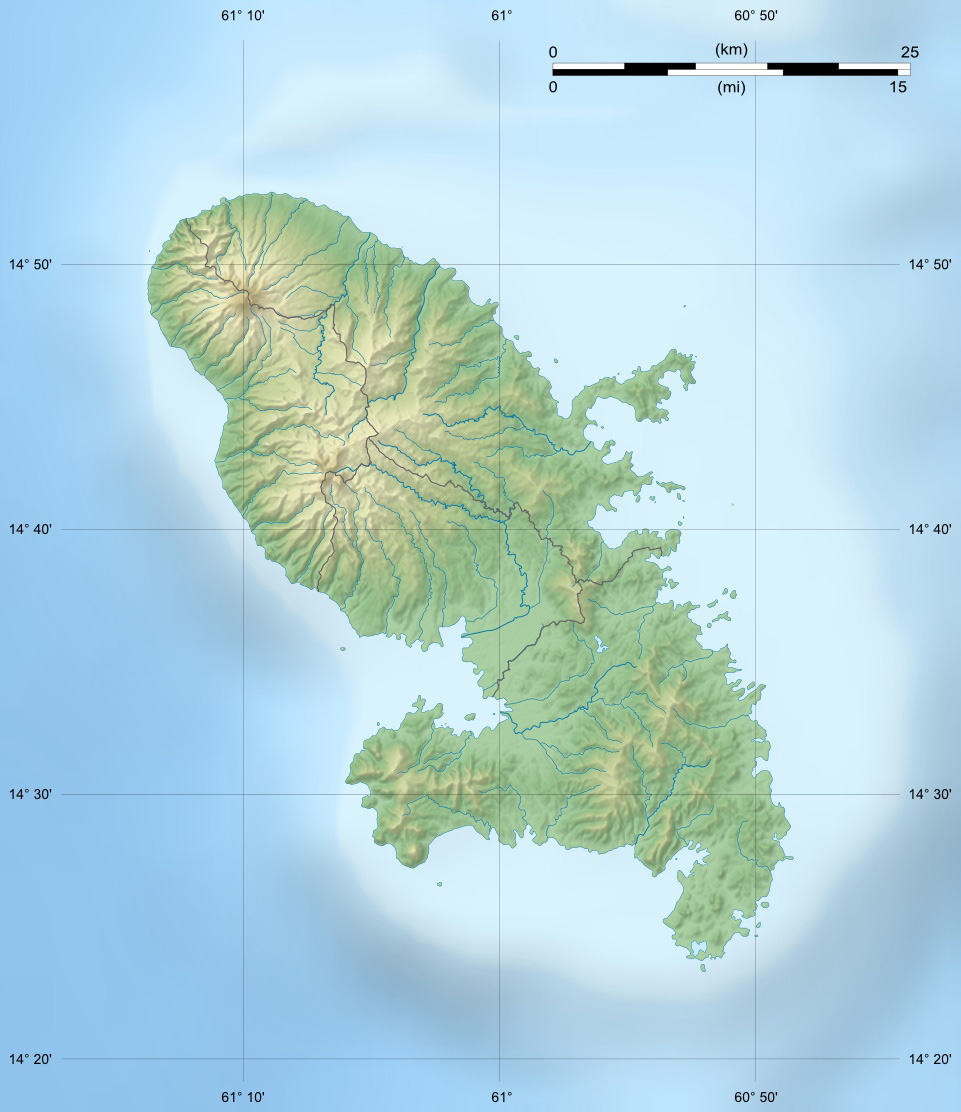
- Location of mouth

Location
- Country: France
- Region: Martinique

Physical characteristics
- Mouth: Caribbean Sea
  - coordinates: 14.6021°N 61.0741°W
- Length: 11.6 km (7.2 mi)

The Rivière Madame is a river of Martinique. It flows into the Caribbean Sea in Fort-de-France. It is 11.6 km (7.2 mi) long.

== See also ==
- List of rivers of Martinique
