= List of rivers of Martinique =

This is a list of rivers of Martinique. Rivers are listed in clockwise order, starting at the north end of the island.

- Grande Rivière
- Rivière Roche
- Rivière Capot
  - Rivière Falaise
- Rivière du Lorrain
- Rivière du Galion
- Rivière Desroses
- Rivière Pilote
- Rivière Salée
- Lézarde
  - Rivière Blanche
- Rivière Monsieur
- Rivière Madame
- Rivière de Fond Bourlet
- Rivière du Carbet
- Roxelane
- Rivière des Pères
- Rivière Sèche
- Rivière Claire
- Rivière de l'Anse Céron
