= Rivière Monsieur =

River in Martinique

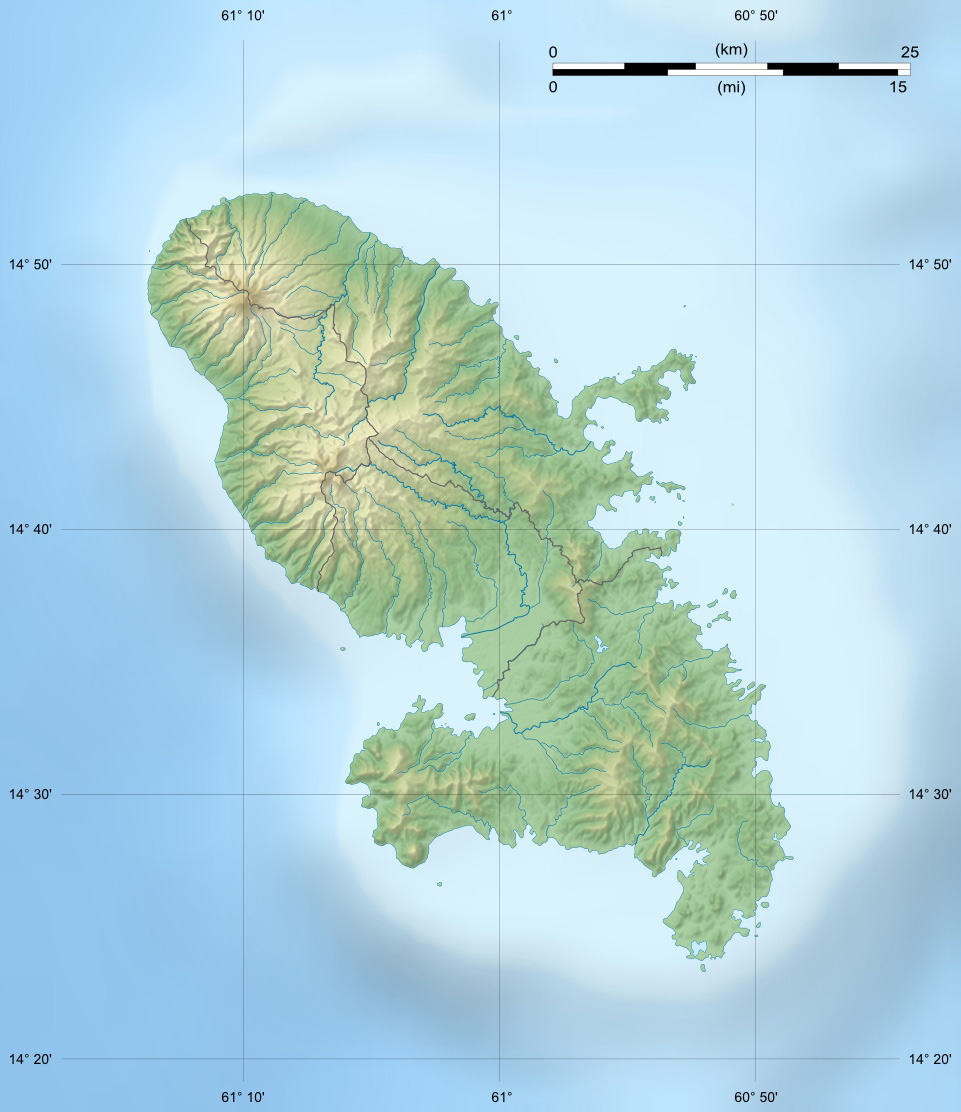
- Location of mouth

Location
- Country: France
- Region: Martinique

Physical characteristics
- Mouth: Caribbean Sea
  - coordinates: 14.5983°N 61.0525°W
- Length: 16.9 km (10.5 mi)

The Rivière Monsieur is a river of Martinique. It flows into the Caribbean Sea in Fort-de-France. It is 16.9 km (10.5 mi) long.

== See also ==
- List of rivers of Martinique
