= Rivière Desroses =

River in Martinique

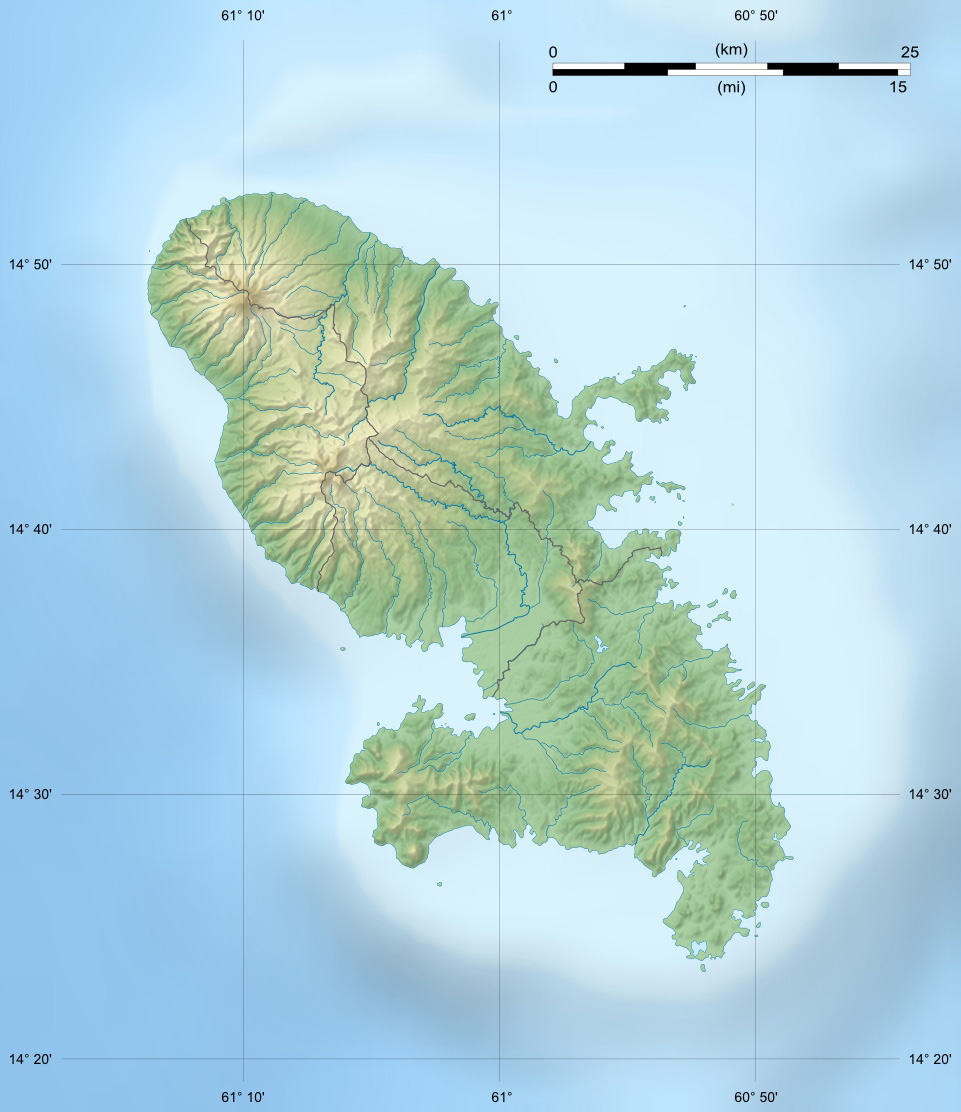
- Location of mouth

Location
- Country: France
- Region: Martinique

Physical characteristics
- Mouth: Caribbean Sea
  - coordinates: 14.6205°N 60.8977°W
- Length: 5.9 km (3.7 mi)

The Rivière Desroses is a river of Martinique. Its lower, canalized part is also called Canal du François. It flows into the Caribbean Sea in Le François. It is 5.9 km (3.7 mi) long.

== See also ==
- List of rivers of Martinique
