= List of storms named Cindy =

The name Cindy has been used for twelve tropical cyclones worldwide: ten times in the Atlantic Ocean, once in the Southwest Indian Ocean, and once in the Australian region.

In the Atlantic:

- Hurricane Cindy (1959), caused minor damage to South Carolina
- Tropical Storm Cindy (1963), caused $12 million damage and three deaths in Texas and Louisiana
- Tropical Storm Cindy (1981), formed between Bermuda and Nova Scotia, remained in the open sea
- Tropical Storm Cindy (1987), stayed in the open sea
- Tropical Storm Cindy (1993), the tropical depression that became Cindy crossed Martinique, killing two; as a tropical storm, it made landfall on the Dominican Republic, killing two more
- Hurricane Cindy (1999), reached Category 4 but never threatened land
- Hurricane Cindy (2005), made landfall near Grand Isle, Louisiana, as a weak hurricane; moderate flooding and some tornado damage reported
- Tropical Storm Cindy (2011), formed northeast of Bermuda and moved out to sea
- Tropical Storm Cindy (2017), a large tropical storm that formed in the Gulf of Mexico and made landfall in southwest Louisiana; produced heavy rainfall and flooding
- Tropical Storm Cindy (2023), formed east of the Lesser Antilles but dissipated into an open wave without ever affecting land

In the Southwest Indian:

- Tropical Storm Cindy (1998), originally named Victor in the Australian region; renamed Cindy as it moved into the Southwest Indian Ocean

In the Australian region:

- Cyclone Cindy (1970), short-lived storm in the Gulf of Carpentaria
