= Rivière de Fond Bourlet =

River in Martinique

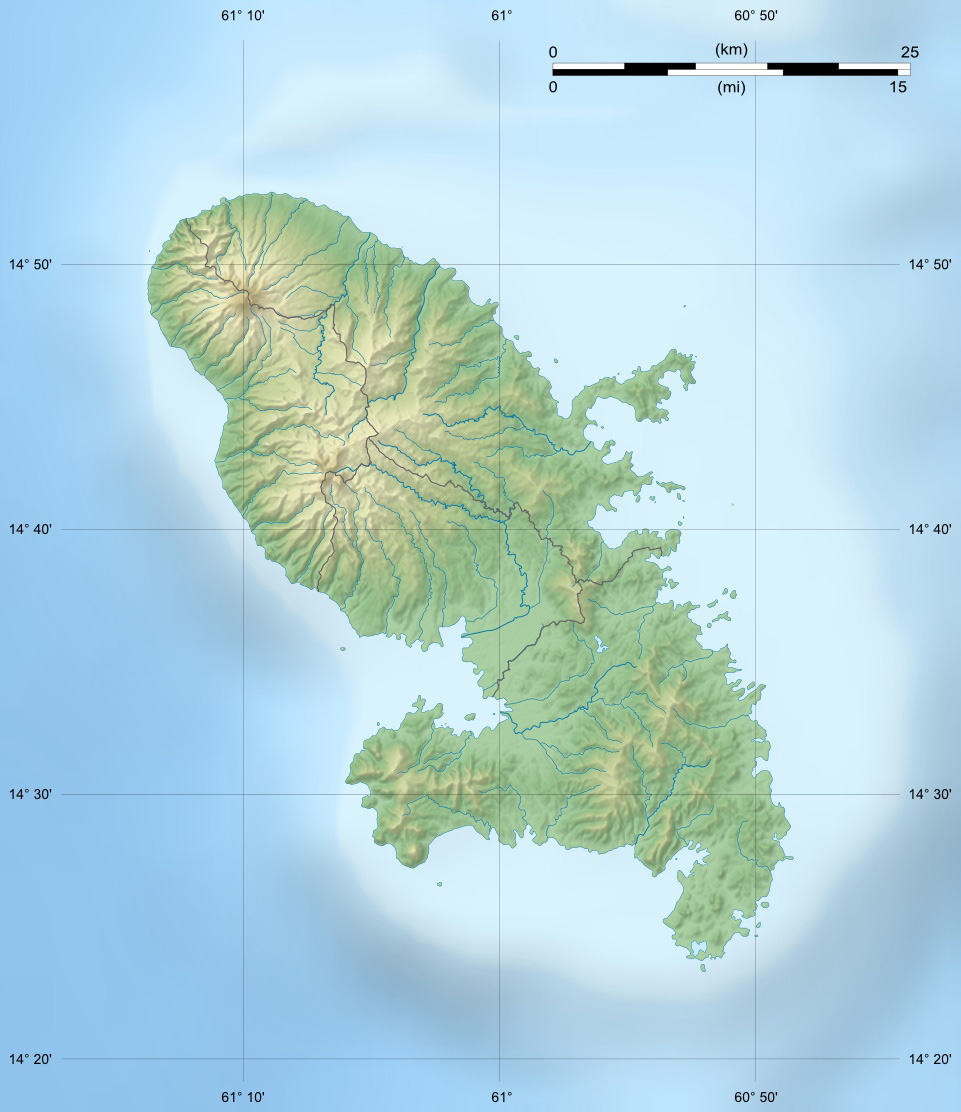
- Location of mouth

Location
- Country: France
- Region: Martinique

Physical characteristics
- Mouth: Caribbean Sea
  - coordinates: 14.6336°N 61.1323°W
- Length: 6.7 km (4.2 mi)

The Rivière de Fond Bourlet is a river of Martinique. It flows into the Caribbean Sea near Case-Pilote. It is 6.7 km (4.2 mi) long.

== See also ==
- List of rivers of Martinique
