= Rivière Pilote =

River in Martinique

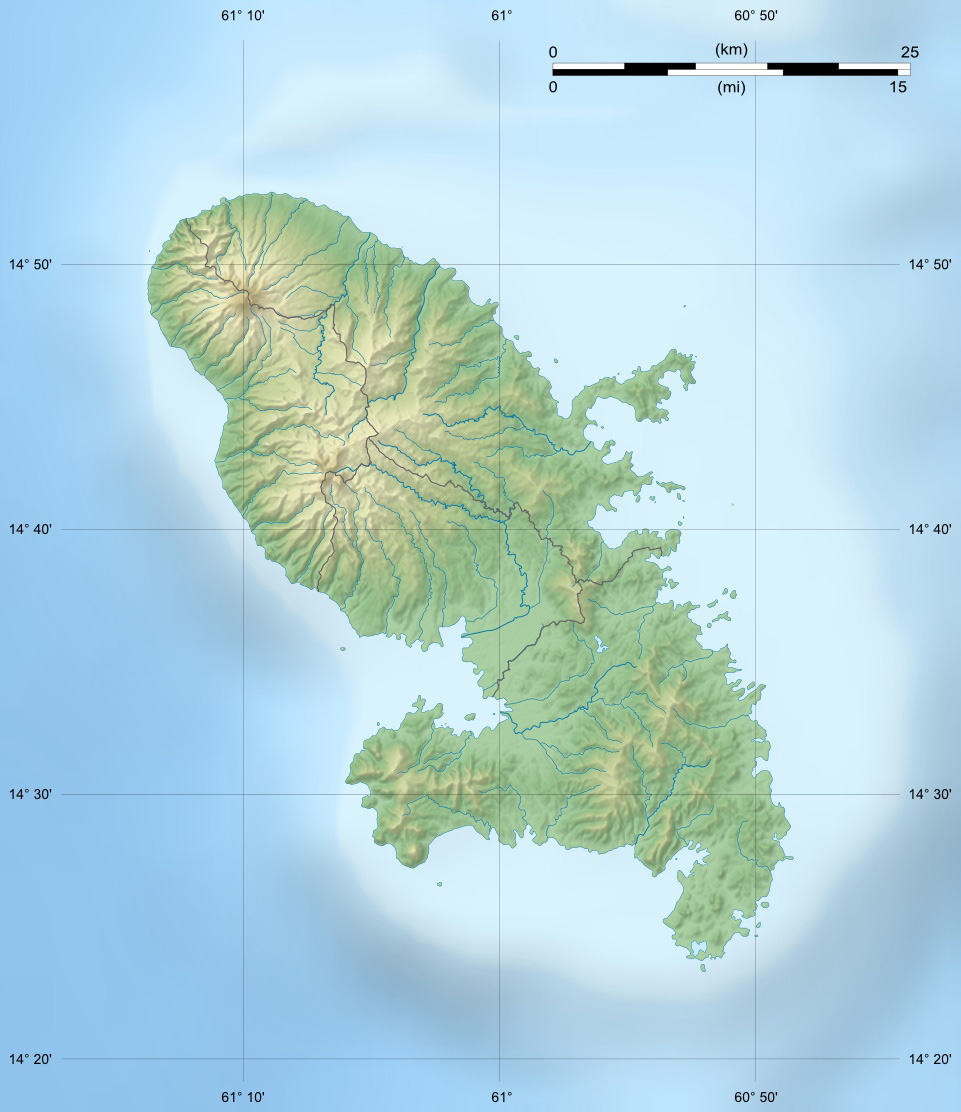
- Location of mouth

Location
- Country: France
- Region: Martinique

Physical characteristics
- Mouth: Caribbean Sea
  - coordinates: 14.4651°N 60.9116°W
- Length: 11.8 km (7.3 mi)

The Rivière Pilote or Grande Rivière Pilote is a river of Martinique. It passes through the town Rivière-Pilote and flows into the Caribbean Sea near Sainte-Luce. It is 11.8 km (7.3 mi) long.

== See also ==
- List of rivers of Martinique
