= Roxelane (river) =

River in Martinique

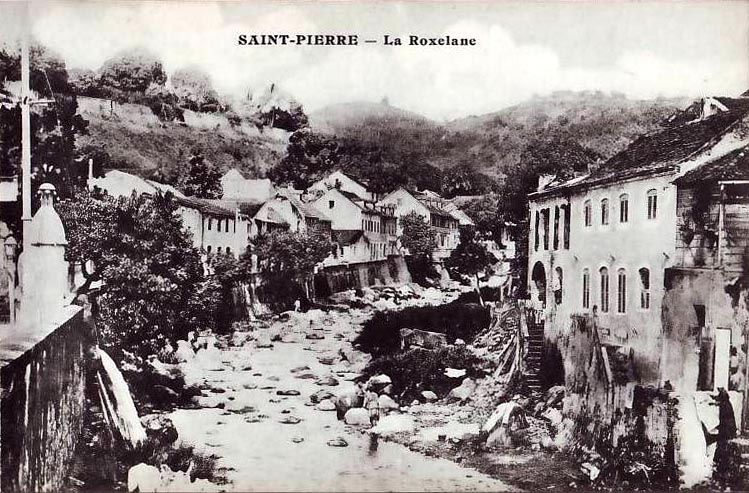

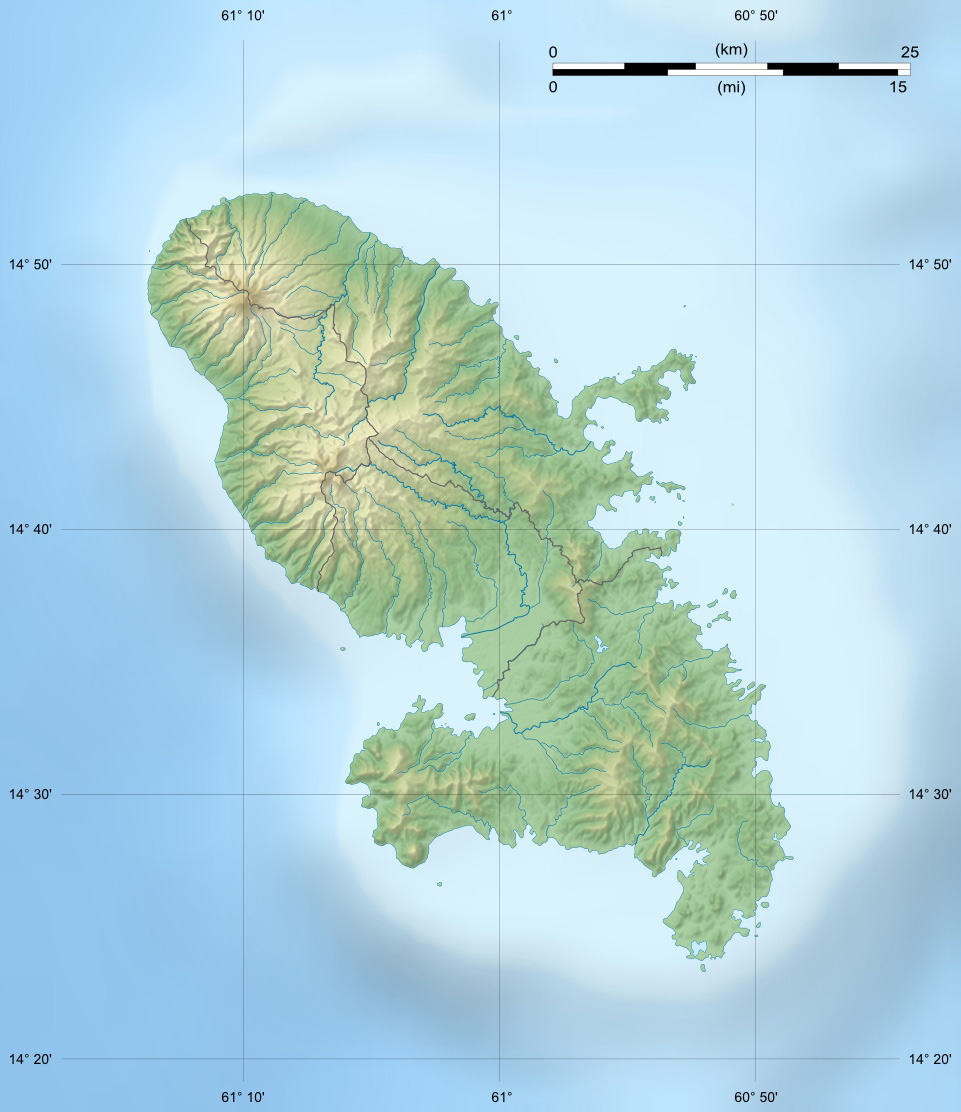
- Location of mouth

Location
- Country: France
- Region: Martinique

Physical characteristics
- Mouth: Caribbean Sea
  - coordinates: 14.7479°N 61.1791°W
- Length: 8.9 km (5.5 mi)

The Roxelane is a river of Martinique. It flows into the Caribbean Sea in Saint-Pierre. It is 8.9 km (5.5 mi) long.

== See also ==
- List of rivers of Martinique
