= Rivière Sèche =

River in Martinique

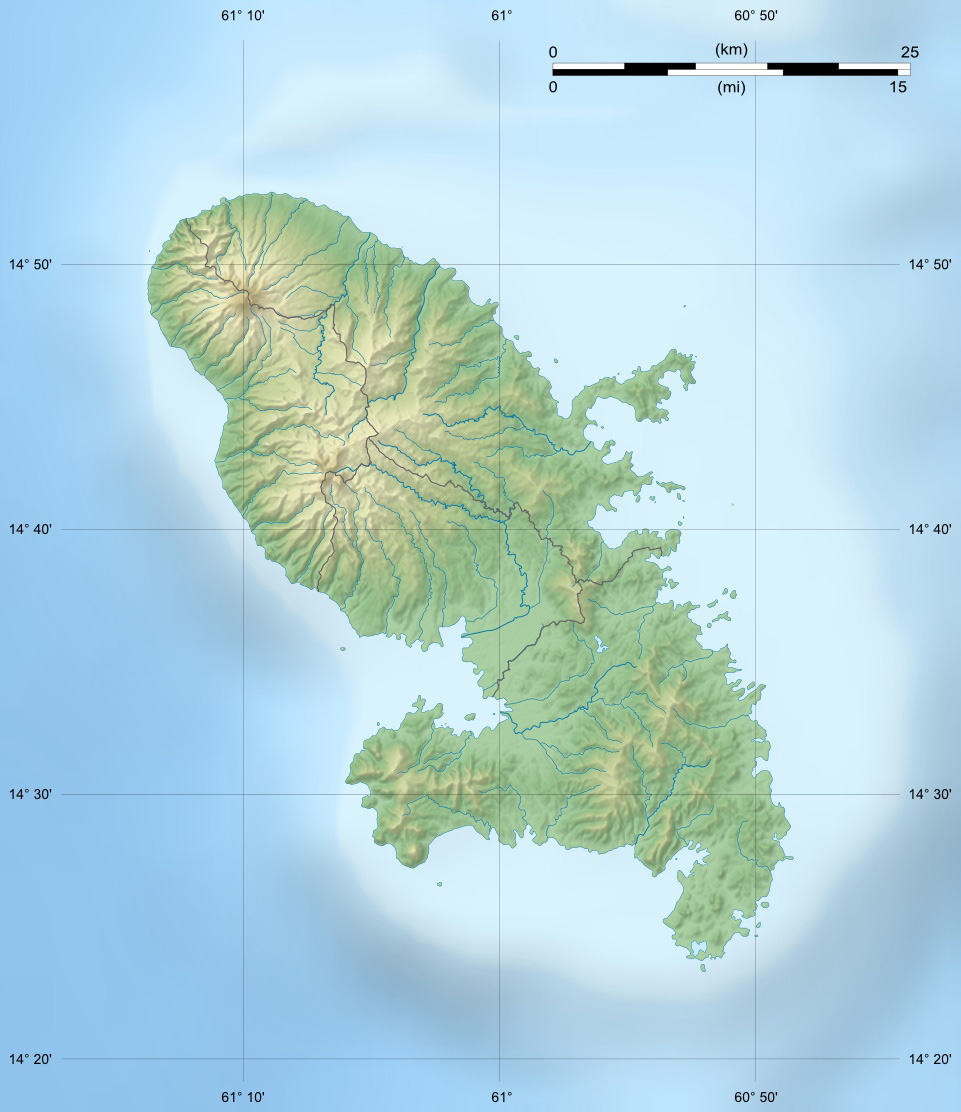
- Location of mouth

Location
- Country: France
- Region: Martinique

Physical characteristics
- Mouth: Caribbean Sea
  - coordinates: 14.7633°N 61.1920°W
- Length: 6.9 km (4.3 mi)

The Rivière Sèche is a river of Martinique. It flows into the Caribbean Sea near Saint-Pierre. It is 6.9 km (4.3 mi) long.

== See also ==
- List of rivers of Martinique
