= Rivière Claire =

River in Martinique

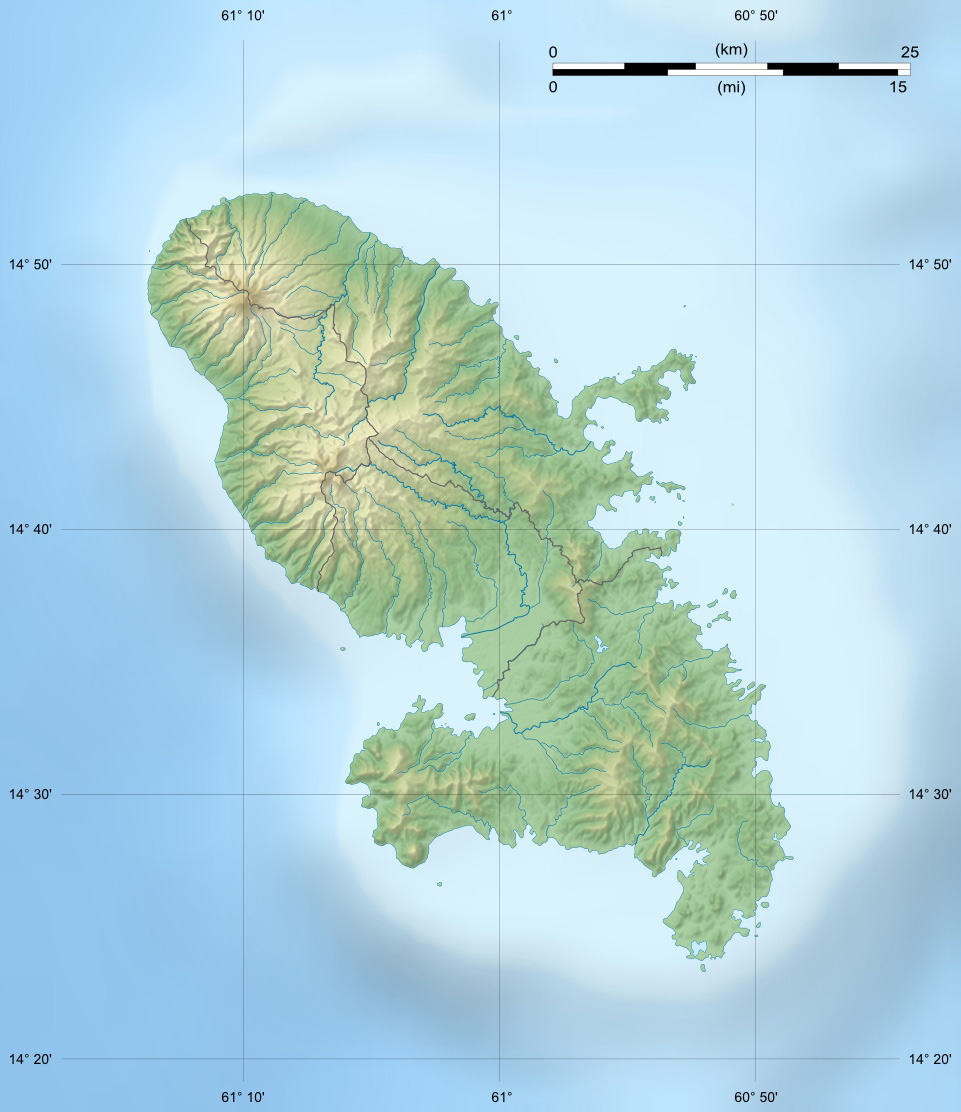
- Location of mouth

Location
- Country: France
- Region: Martinique

Physical characteristics
- Mouth: Caribbean Sea
  - coordinates: 14.7730°N 61.2012°W
- Length: 6.3 km (3.9 mi)

The Rivière Claire is a river of Martinique. It flows into the Caribbean Sea near Saint-Pierre. It is 6.3 km (3.9 mi) long.

== See also ==
- List of rivers of Martinique
