= Grande Rivière (Martinique) =

River in Martinique

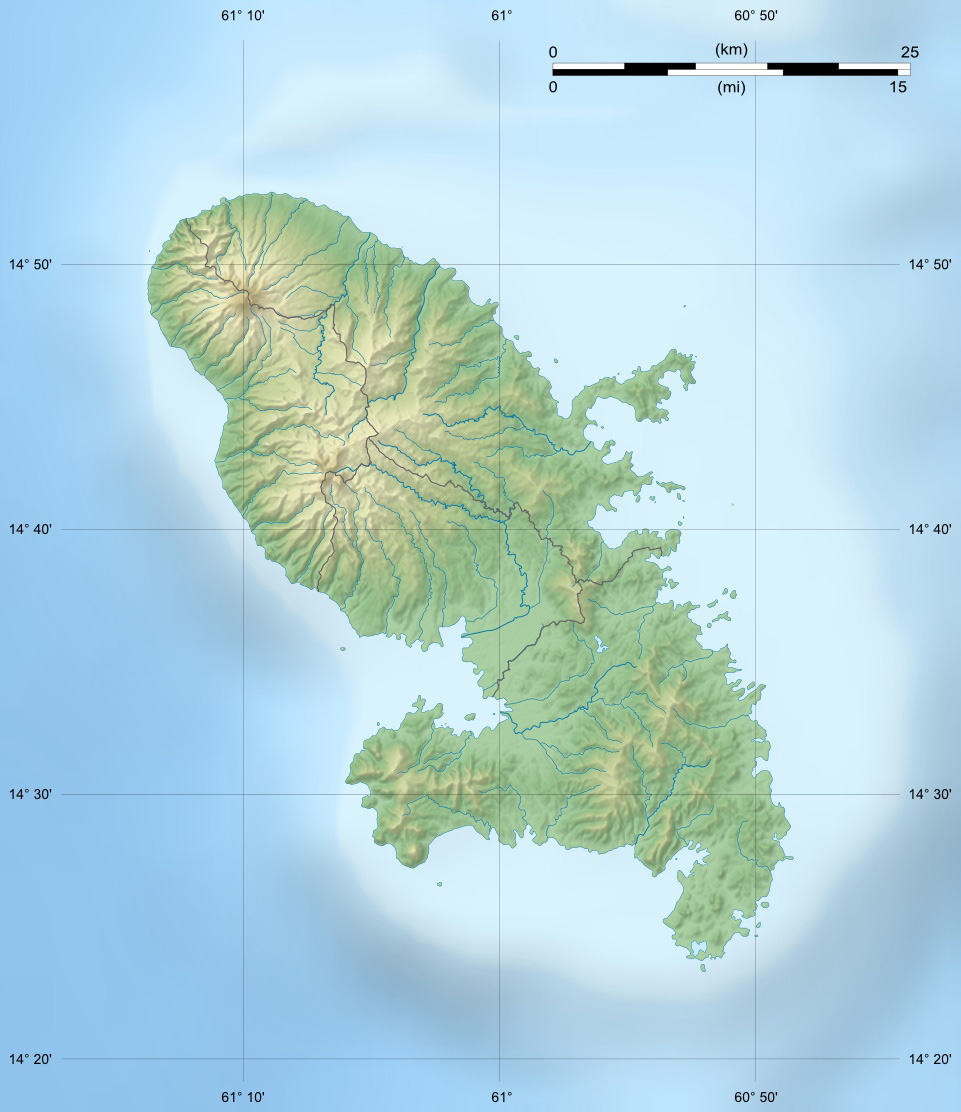
- Location of mouth

Location
- Country: France
- Region: Martinique

Physical characteristics
- Mouth: Caribbean Sea
  - coordinates: 14.8745°N 61.1783°W
- Length: 8.1 km (5.0 mi)

The Grande Rivière is a river of Martinique. It flows into the Caribbean Sea in Grand'Rivière. It is 8.1 km (5.0 mi) long.

== See also ==
- List of rivers of Martinique
