= Pilote (name) =

Pilote can be a middle name or a surname. Notable people with the surname include:

== Middle name ==
- Gabrielle Pilote Fortin (born 1993), Canadian former racing cyclist

== Surname ==
- Binta Pilote (1948–2020), Guinean pilot
- Pierre Pilote (1931–2017), Canadian ice hockey defenceman
- Roger Pilote (1934–2023), Canadian politician
- Sébastien Pilote, Canadian film director and screenwriter
