= Rivière du Galion =

River in Martinique

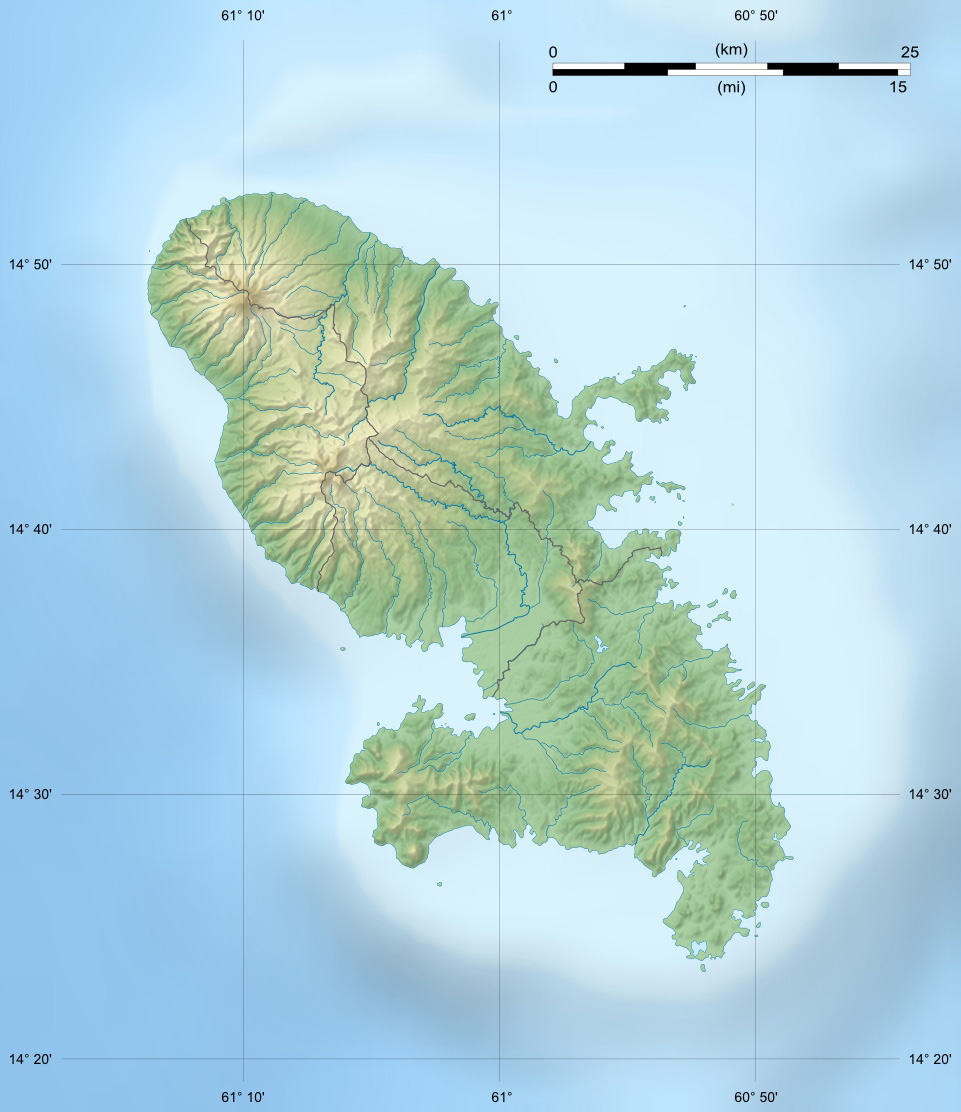
- Location of mouth

Location
- Country: France
- Region: Martinique

Physical characteristics
- Mouth: Caribbean Sea
  - coordinates: 14.7212°N 60.9413°W
- Length: 23.1 km (14.4 mi)

The Rivière du Galion is a river of Martinique. It flows into the Caribbean Sea near La Trinité. It is 23.1 km (14.4 mi) long.

== See also ==
- List of rivers of Martinique
