= Rivière Capot =

River in Martinique

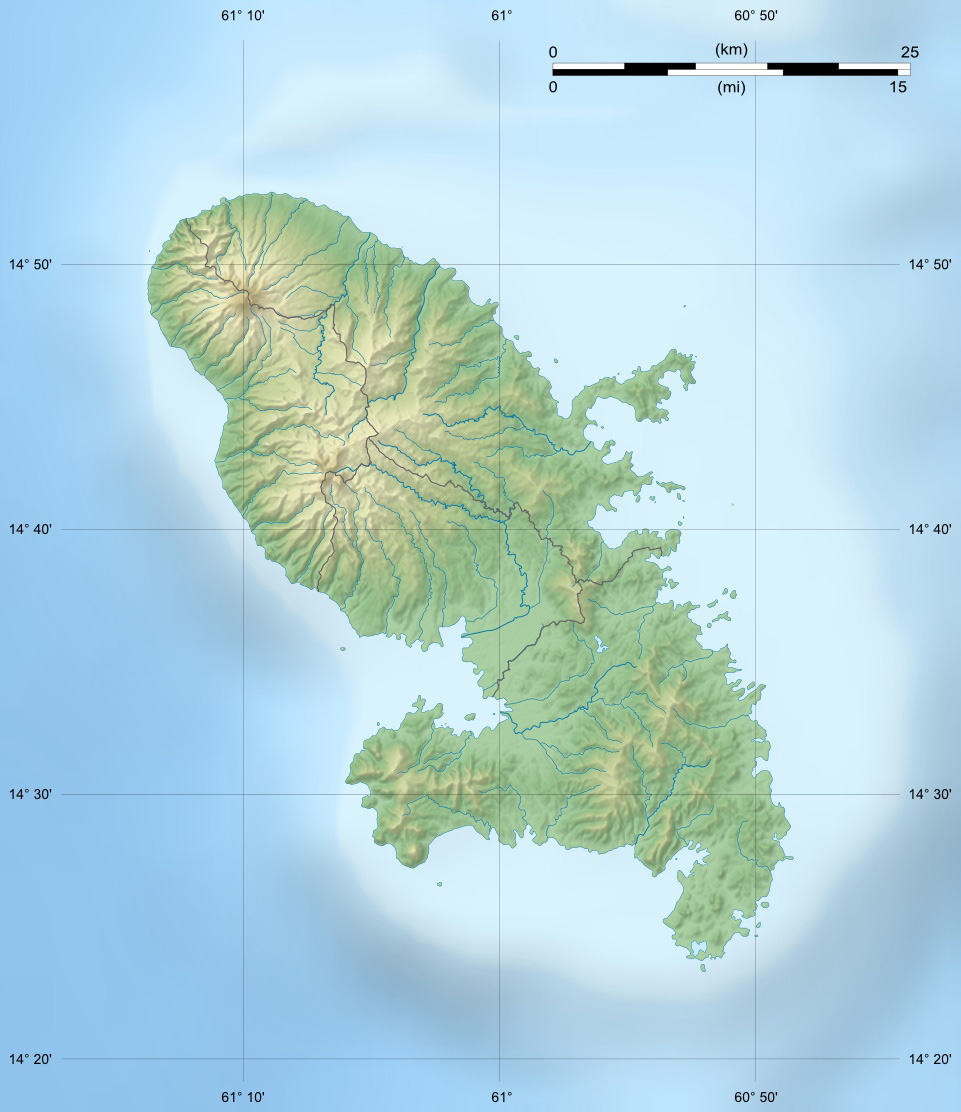
- Location of mouth

Location
- Country: France
- Region: Martinique

Physical characteristics
- Mouth: Caribbean Sea
  - coordinates: 14.8530°N 61.0846°W
- Length: 21.8 km (13.5 mi)

The Rivière Capot is a river of Martinique. It flows into the Caribbean Sea near Basse-Pointe. It is 21.8 km (13.5 mi) long.

== See also ==
- List of rivers of Martinique
