= Rivière des Pères =

River in Martinique

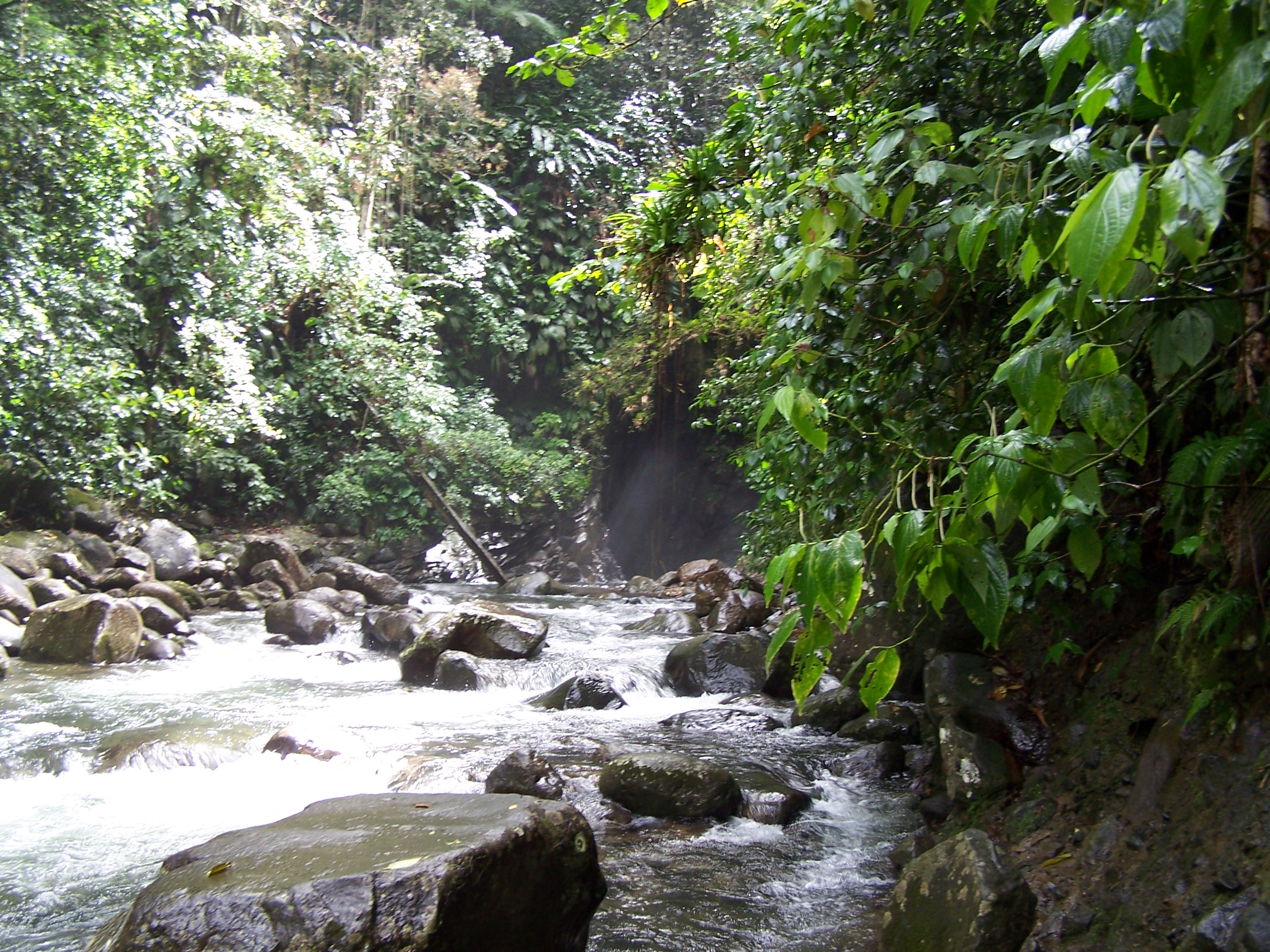

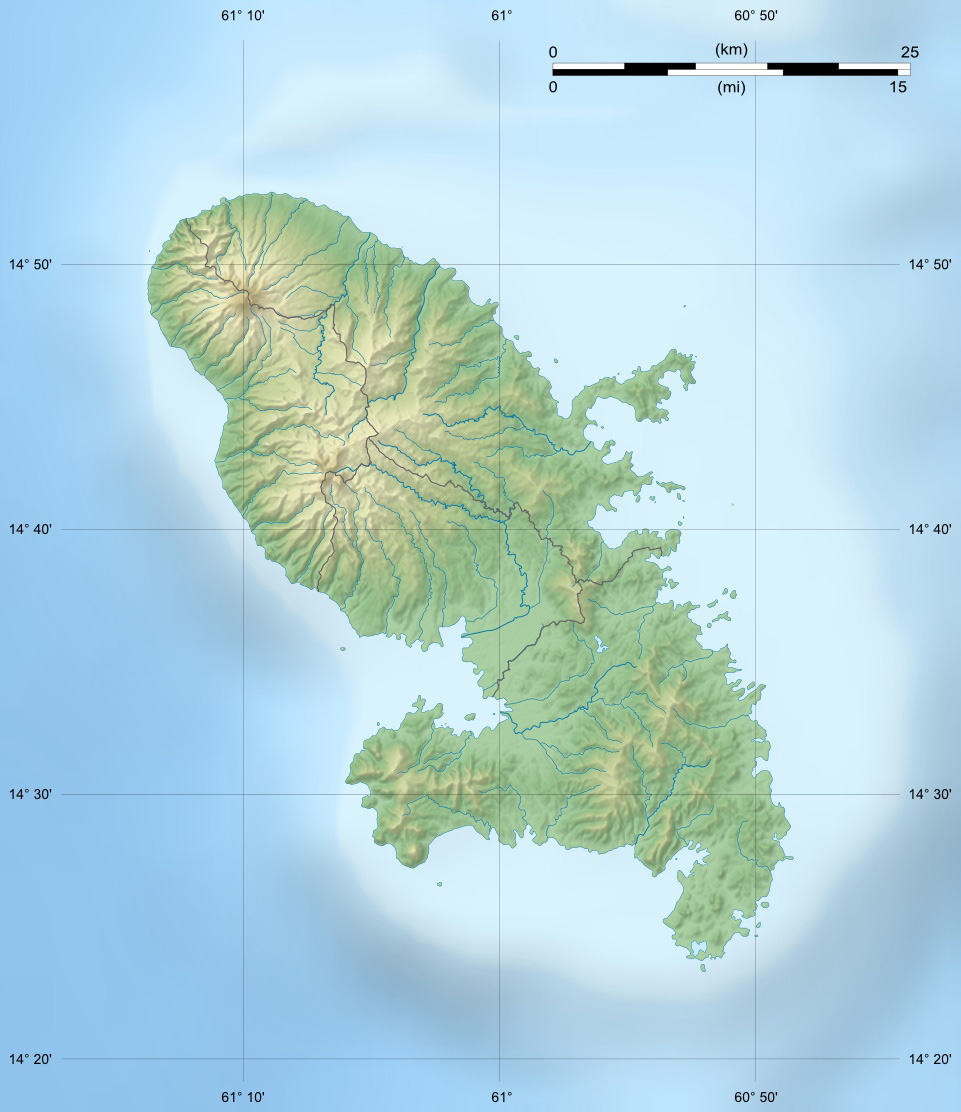
- Location of mouth

Location
- Country: France
- Region: Martinique

Physical characteristics
- Mouth: Caribbean Sea
  - coordinates: 14.7538°N 61.1834°W
- Length: 8.6 km (5.3 mi)

The Rivière des Pères is a river of Martinique. It flows into the Caribbean Sea near Saint-Pierre. It is 8.6 km (5.3 mi) long.

== See also ==
- List of rivers of Martinique
