= Tropical cyclones in 1993 =

Year boundaries
- First system: Colina
- Formed: January 13, 1993
- Last system: Rewa
- Dissipated: January 23, 1994

Strongest system
- Name: Koryn
- Lowest pressure: 905 mbar (hPa); 26.72 inHg

Longest lasting system
- Name: Rewa
- Duration: 28 days

Year statistics
- Total systems: 110
- Named systems: 78
- Total fatalities: 1997
- Total damage: $4.3 billion (1993 USD)
Related articles
- 1993 Atlantic hurricane season
- 1993 Pacific hurricane season
- 1993 Pacific typhoon season
- 1993 North Indian Ocean cyclone season
- 1992–93 South-West Indian Ocean cyclone season
- 1993–94 South-West Indian Ocean cyclone season
- 1992–93 Australian region cyclone season
- 1993–94 Australian region cyclone season
- 1992–93 South Pacific cyclone season
- 1993–94 South Pacific cyclone season

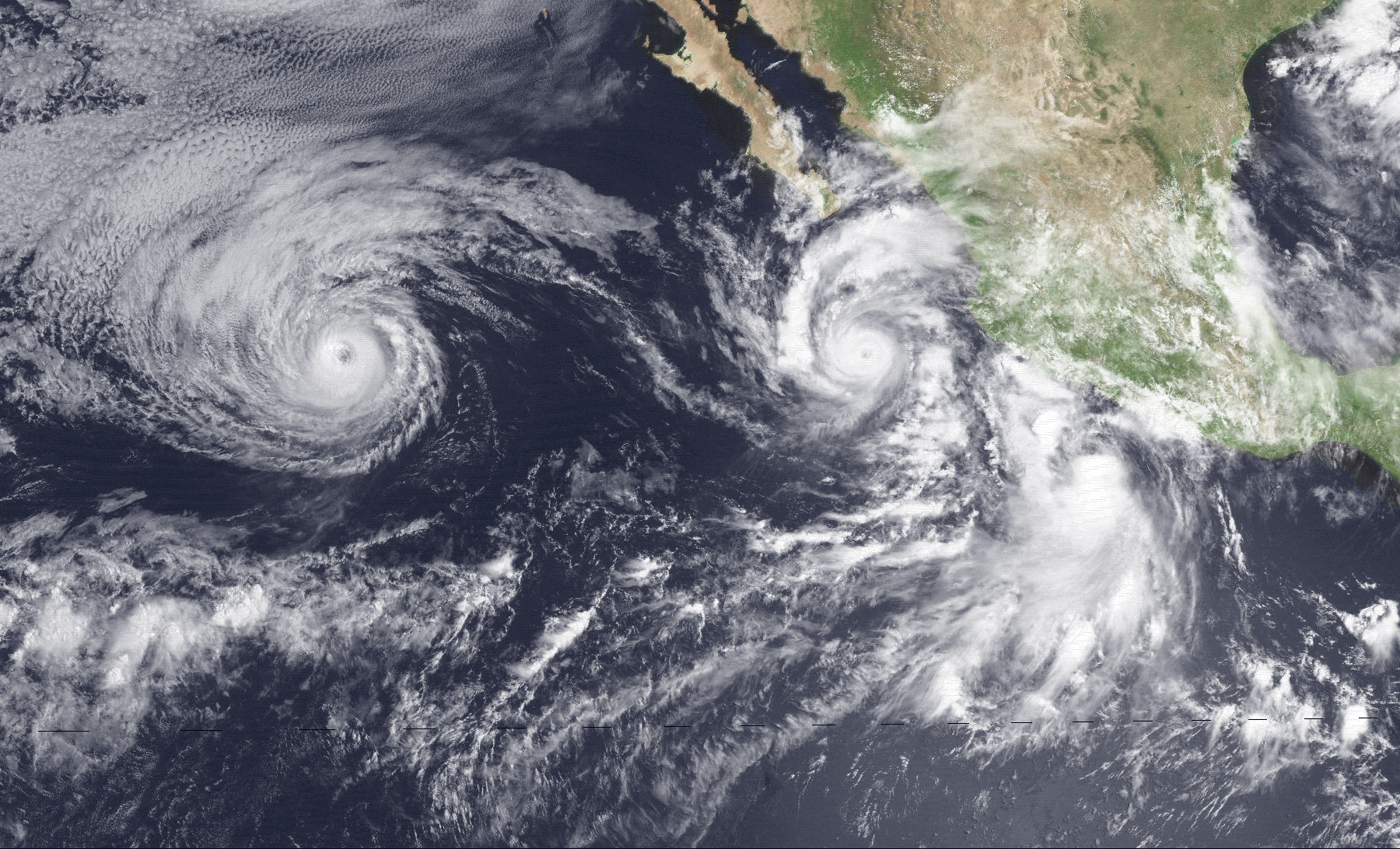
From left to right: Greg, Hilary and Irwin on August 21

During 1993, tropical cyclones formed within seven different bodies of water called basins. To date, 110 tropical cyclones formed, of which 78 were given names by various weather agencies. Only one Category 5 tropical cyclone, Typhoon Ed, formed in 1993. The accumulated cyclone energy (ACE) index for the 1993 (seven basins combined), as calculated by Colorado State University was 710.4 units.

== Global atmospheric and hydrological conditions ==
A weak El Niño prevailed until the end of the year, leading to inactivity in the North Atlantic and the North Indian Ocean and an average activity in the West Pacific and the Southern Hemisphere (excluding the Australian region basin).

== Summary ==
=== North Atlantic Ocean ===
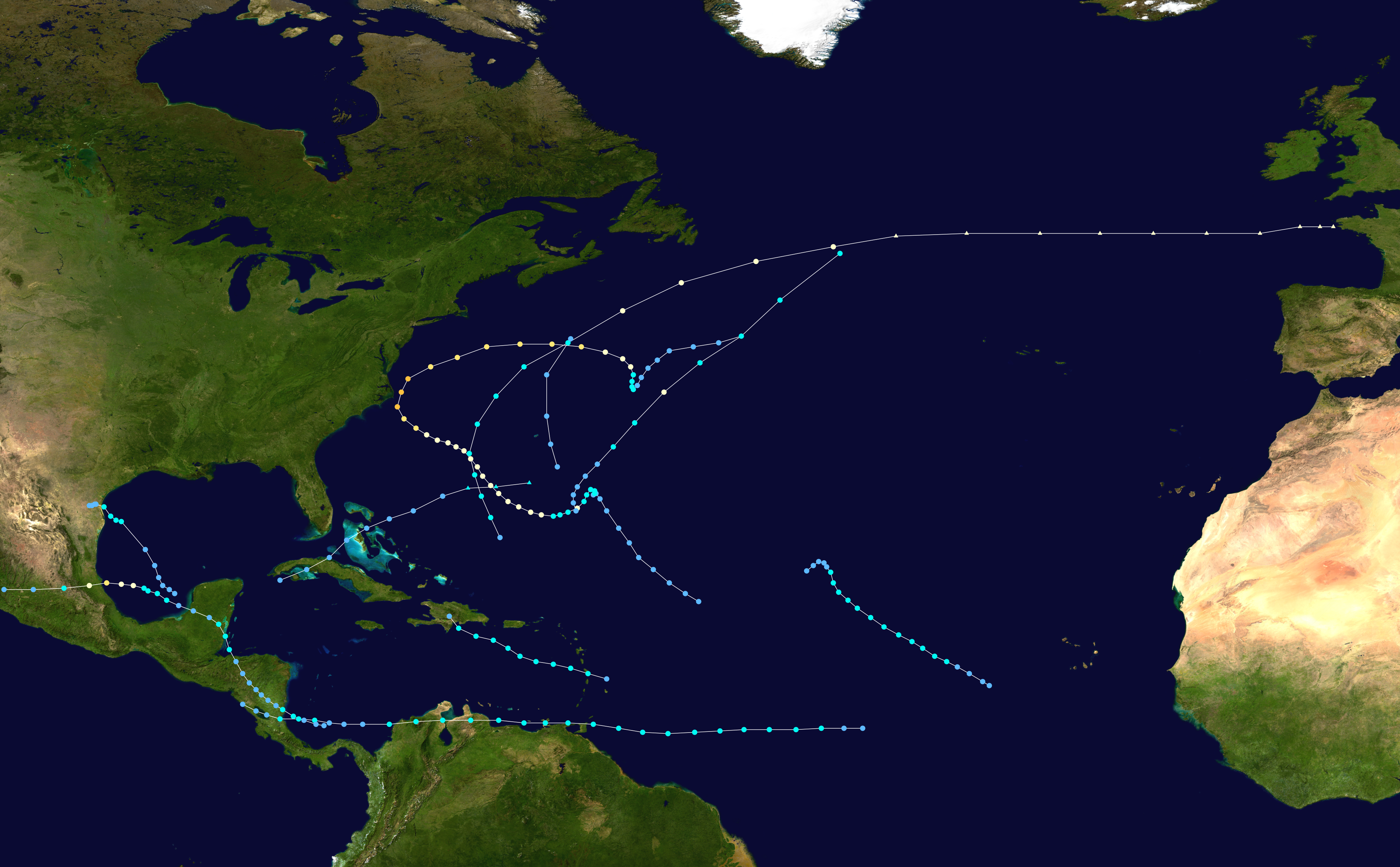
1993 Atlantic hurricane season summary map

An average Atlantic hurricane season features 12 tropical storms, 6 hurricanes, and 3 major hurricanes, and features an Accumulated Cyclone Energy (ACE) count of 106. In the year, the statistics fell below, featuring only 8 tropical storms, 4 hurricanes and a major hurricane- making it a below-average season. It had an ACE total of 39.

The first tropical cyclone, Tropical Depression One, developed on May 31, while the final storm, Tropical Depression Ten, dissipated on September 30, well before the average dissipation date of a season's last tropical cyclone; this represented the earliest end to the hurricane season in ten years. The most intense hurricane, Emily, was a Category 3 on the Saffir–Simpson hurricane scale that paralleled close to the North Carolina coastline causing minor damage and a few deaths before moving out to sea.

The most significant named storm of the season was Hurricane Gert, a tropical cyclone that devastated several countries in Central America and Mexico. Throughout the impact areas, damage totaled to $170 million (1993 USD) (Note: All damage figures are in 1993 USD, unless otherwise noted) and 102 fatalities were reported. The remnants of Gert reached the Pacific Ocean and was classified as Tropical Depression Fourteen-E. Another significant system was Tropical Storm Bret, which resulted in 184 deaths and $25 million in losses as it tracked generally westward across Trinidad, Venezuela, Colombia, and Nicaragua. In the Pacific Ocean, the remnants of Bret were attributed to the development of Hurricane Greg. Three other tropical cyclones brought minor to moderate effects on land; they were Tropical Depression One and Tropical Storms Arlene and Cindy. The storms of the 1993 Atlantic hurricane season collectively caused 339 fatalities and $319 million in losses.

=== Eastern and Central Pacific Ocean ===
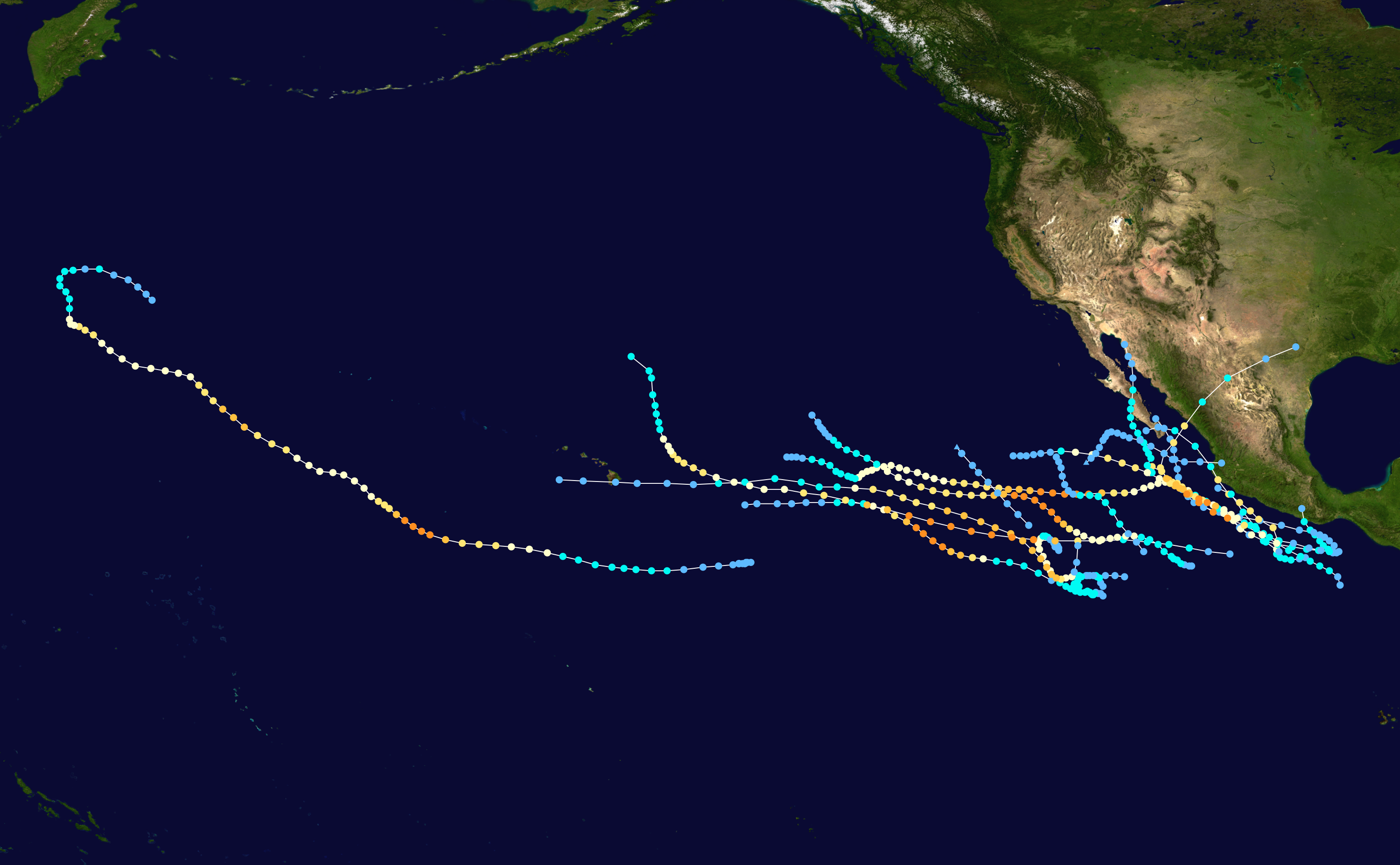
1993 Pacific hurricane season summary map

An average Pacific hurricane season features 15 tropical storms, 9 hurricanes, and 4 major hurricanes, and features an Accumulated Cyclone Energy (ACE) count of 132. In the year, the statistics fell above, featuring 15 tropical storms, 11 hurricanes, and 9 major hurricanes- making it a slightly above-average season. It had an ACE total of 201.8 units.

The first tropical cyclone developed on June 11, over a month after the traditional start of the season. The final named storm of the season, Tropical Storm Norma, dissipated on October 14. The Central Pacific Ocean saw very little tropical activity, with only one cyclone, Hurricane Keoni, developing in that particular region. However, many storms out of the season crossed the threshold into the Central Pacific, many as hurricanes, and even major hurricanes.

The season produced fifteen named storms, which was slightly below the average of sixteen named storms per season. However, the total of eleven hurricanes during the season was slightly above average, and the total of nine major hurricanes was significantly higher than the average of three. The most intense cyclone of the season was Hurricane Lidia, a powerful Category 4 hurricane that made landfall in Sinaloa as a Category 2. Killing seven people, Lidia also caused extensive property damage in Mexico and the United States, as the remnants of the system combined with a cold front to produce Severe weather in Texas. However, the most notable storm of the season, in terms of fatalities, was Hurricane Calvin. Originating from an area of disturbed weather on July 4, it reached a peak intensity of 110 mph (180 km/h) before making an initial landfall near Manzanillo, Colima, Mexico. Rapidly weakening due to land interaction with the Mexican coastline, the hurricane re-emerged into Pacific waters, though the storm did not strengthen, and continued to weaken as it moved northwestward. On July 8, Calvin made a second, and final, landfall on the southern tip of Baja California Peninsula before weakening to a tropical depression and dissipating on July 9. At least 34 deaths can be attributed to the system, as well as $32 million (1993 USD) or more in damage.

=== Western Pacific Ocean ===
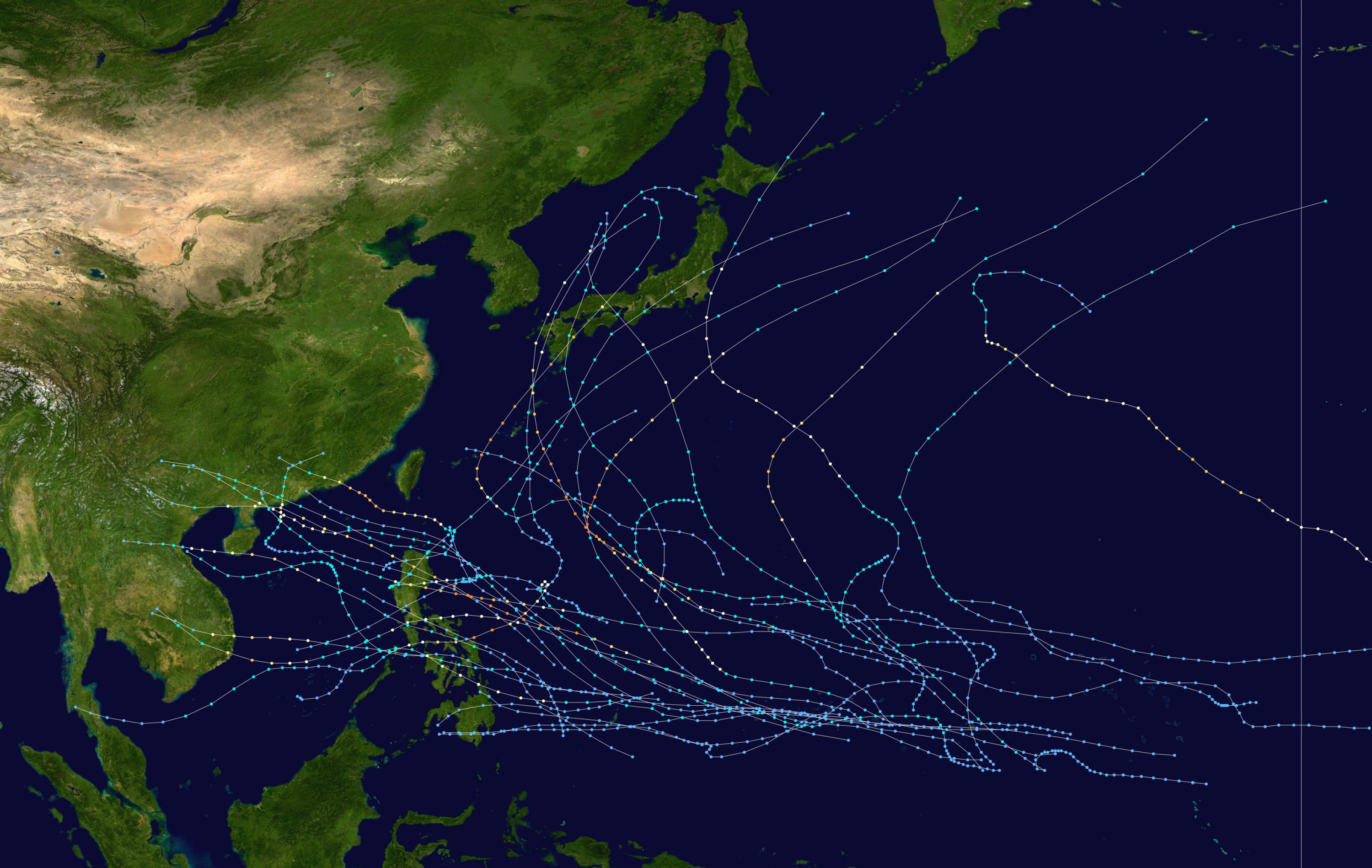
1993 Pacific typhoon season summary map

The average typhoon season lasts year-round, with the majority of the storms forming between May and October. An average Pacific typhoon season features 26 tropical storms, 16 typhoons, and 9 super typhoons (unofficial category). It also features an average Accumulated Cyclone Energy (ACE) count of approximately 294; the basin is typically the most active basin for tropical cyclone formation. The season was average when it comes to the number of tropical storms (28); however, the number of typhoons and the super typhoons were below-average, spawning 15 and 3, respectively.

Typhoon Koryn was the strongest tropical cyclone of the season, becoming a super typhoon and peaking with a pressure of 905 hPa. It caused 37 direct deaths and damages amounting to $224 million as it devastated the Philippines and the South China. Irma caused 10 fatalities as it affected the Marshall and the Caroline Islands. Robyn caused $68 million worth of damages as it affected Japan and the nearby South Korea. Yancy also affected the country, causing over 48 deaths and damages over $1 billion. Lola and Manny of December, altogether caused 538 deaths as it affected the Philippines. Nell closed the season, dissipating on January 1, 1994.

=== North Indian Ocean ===
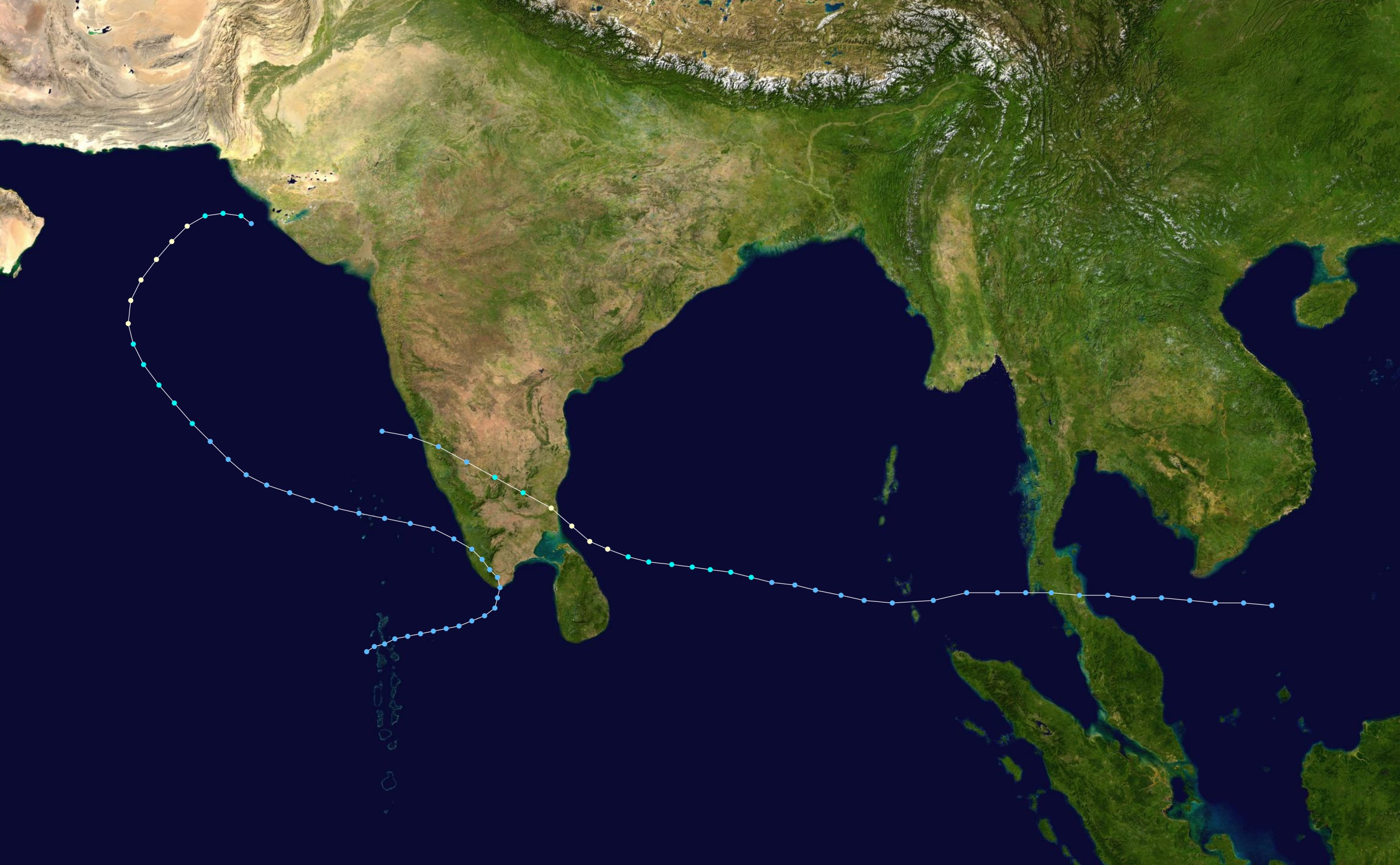
1993 North Indian Ocean cyclone season summary map

The season was the quietest on record in the basin, with only four tropical disturbances forming.

There were no storms before June, and during that month, a deep depression formed off the east coast of India. It brought flooding rains as it moved through Bangladesh and dissipated over northeastern India. The depression struck in the midst of ongoing floods, which were responsible for 200 deaths in the country in June 1993. The next depression – the only to originate over the Arabian Sea in the season – formed on November 8 and moved toward southern India. The system killed 35 people before weakening and turning to the northwest. It re-intensified into a Very Severe Cyclonic Storm, but weakened just off the coast of Pakistan due to wind shear. The storm killed 609 people in the country due to flooding. The final two depressions had their origins from the western Pacific basin. In late November, a convective system crossed the Malay Peninsula and developed into an intense tropical cyclone, reaching estimated peak winds of 165 km/h (105 mph) on December 4. While at peak intensity, the cyclone moved ashore southern India near Karaikal, causing widespread damage estimated at US$216 million (1993 USD). The storm killed 70 people and displaced at least 68,000 people. The final depression was the reformation of Typhoon Manny. It dissipated near southern India on December 20, bringing heavy rainfall to the country.

=== South-West Indian Ocean ===
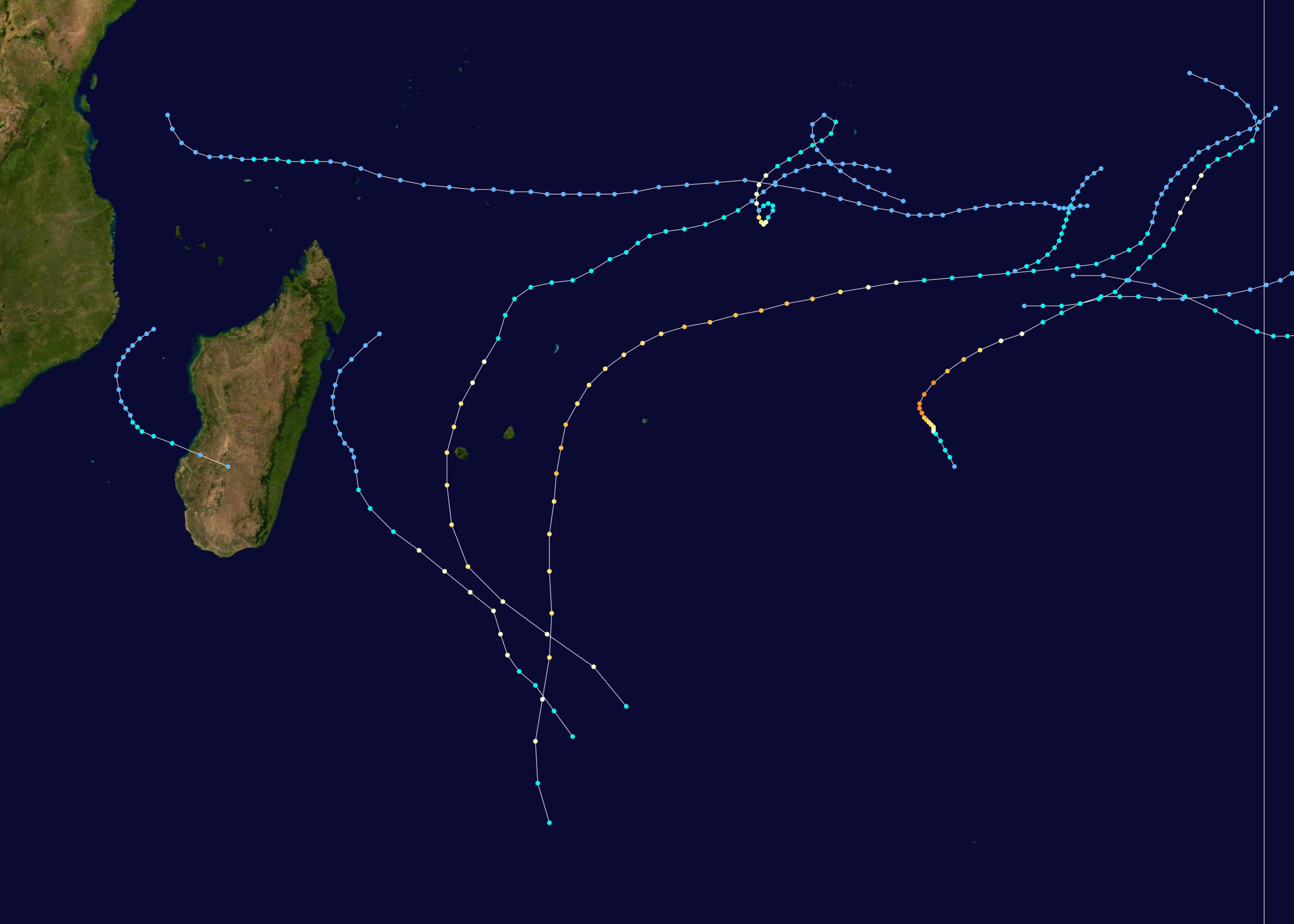
1992–93 South-West Indian Ocean cyclone season summary map

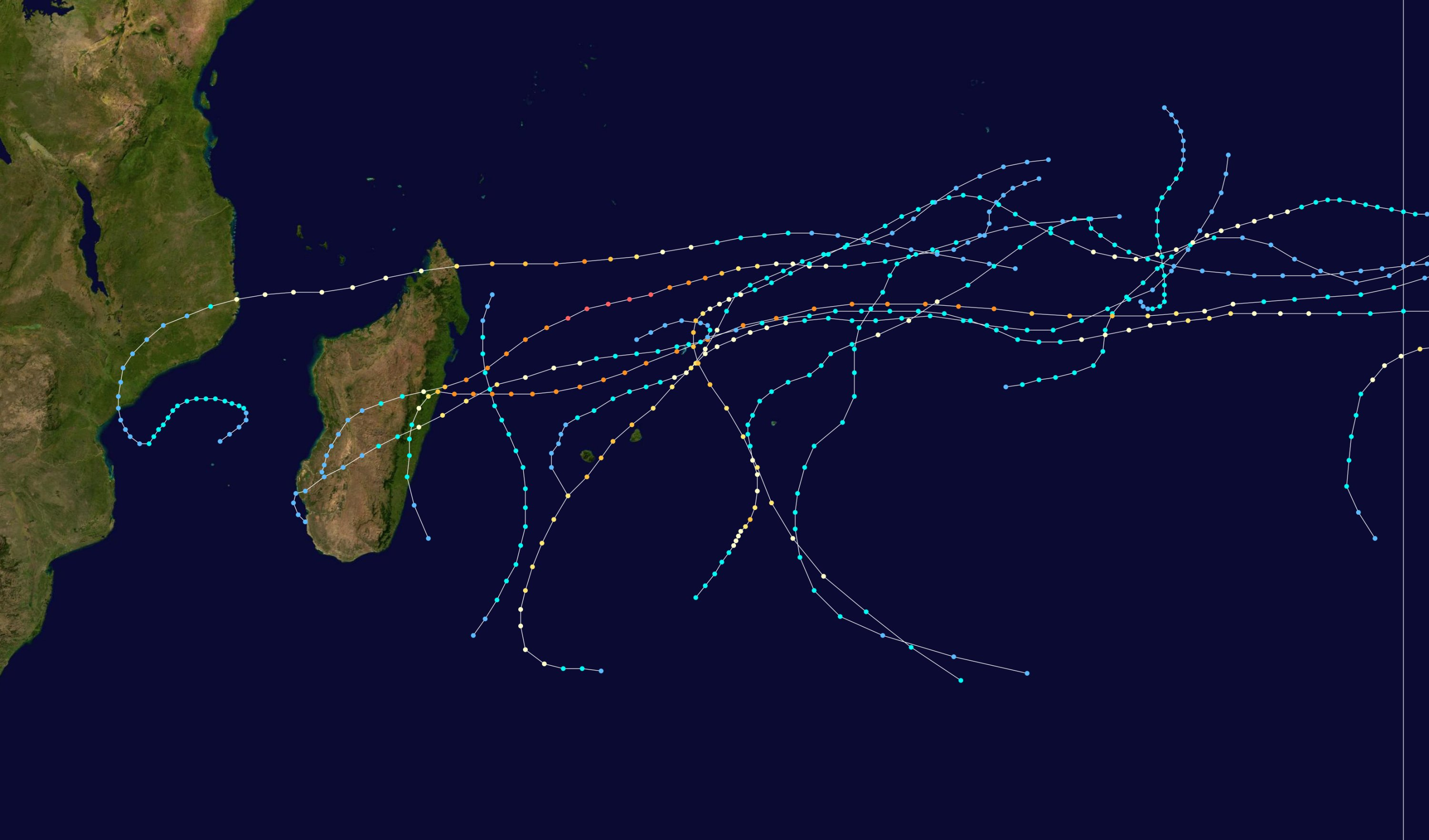
1993–94 South-West Indian Ocean cyclone season summary map

==== January–June ====
The 1992–93 South-West Indian Ocean cyclone season lasted longer than normal, with the first storm, Aviona forming on September 27, 1992 and the final storm Konita not dissipating until May 7, 1993. It was an above-average season, with four tropical cyclones – the equivalent of a minimal hurricane – along with six tropical storms, one subtropical depression, and several depressions including one that was named.

At the time, the season officially went from November 15, 1991, to April 30, 1992, although this season began in September with the formation of Tropical Storm Aviona in the northeastern portion of the basin. A month later, Tropical Storm Babie also formed in the northeastern portion of the basin before the season's official start. After several depressions formed in December and early January, Cyclone Colina formed and struck Réunion, which damaged houses and killed 2 people and left 12 missing there. Three storms were active at the same time in the middle of January, including Colina – Tropical Storm Dessilia moved across Madagascar with gusty winds, and Cyclone Edwina was the longest-lasting and strongest storm of the season. Edwina brushed the Mascarene Islands with gusty winds and light rainfall. In mid-February, Tropical Storm Finella brought locally heavy rainfall to Réunion, reaching 1,074 mm (42.3 in) along the island's east coast and causing minimal rainfall along the southern coast. The Intertropical Convergence Zone (ITCZ) became active toward the end of February, spawning tropical storms Gracia and Ionia as well as Tropical Depression Hutelle. Ionia, the last of five system to cross Madagascar during the season, killed eight people in the country. The season ended with Cyclone Jourdanne, which was the second-strongest storm of the season in April, and Cyclone Konita in May.

==== July–December ====
Alexina formed as a tropical disturbance on November 9, starting the season. It then dissipated on November 14 without affecting any landmasses. Bettina also formed in the same month, without affecting land as it dissipated. A tropical disturbance and Cecilia formed on the month of December, with the latter ending the 1993 season.

=== Australian region ===
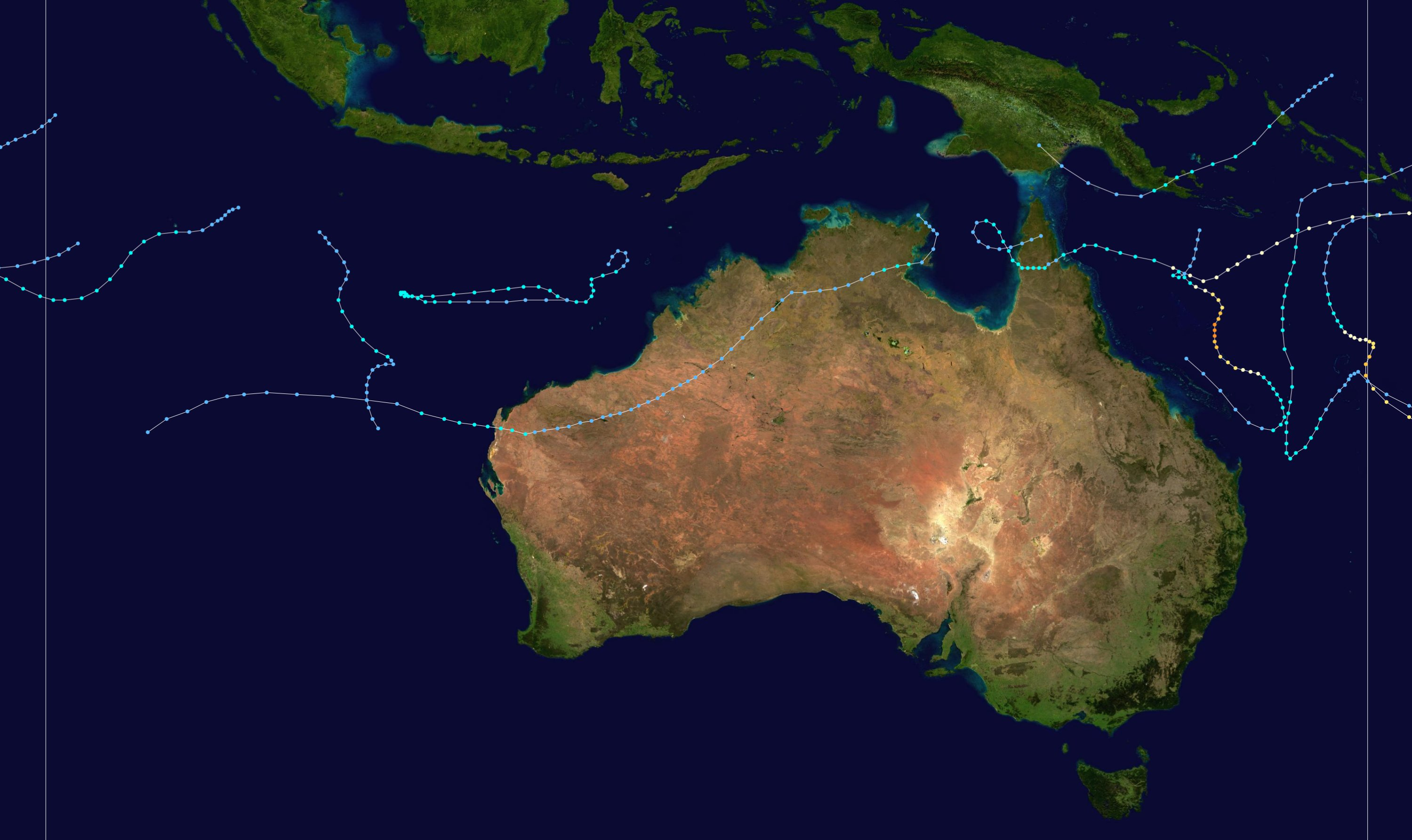
1992–93 Australian region cyclone season summary Map

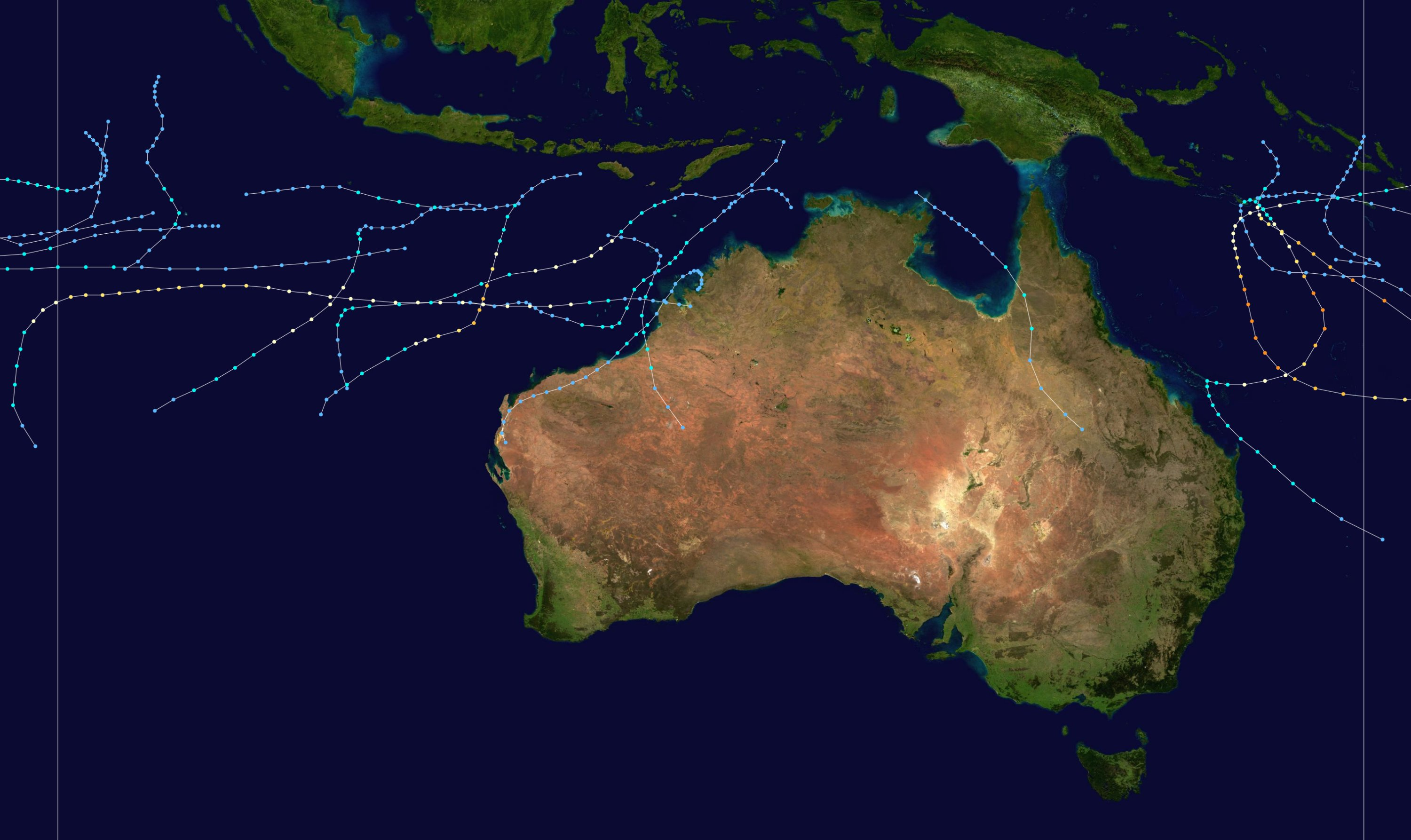
1993–94 Australian region cyclone season summary Map

==== January–June ====
A below-average tropical cyclone season, the basin produced 6 storms. Nina persisted until January 1, shortly before exiting the region. The entire cyclones of the month didn't cause any deaths or damages, however, Adel left two fatalities and fifteen missing as it passed on the north coast of Papua New Guinea, a rare occurrence.

==== July–December ====
Naomi started the season when it formed on December 14. It affected Western Australia and the damages or deaths are unknown. Cyclone Rewa took an unusual and erratic track near the coast of Queensland, forming on December 26 in the South Pacific basin and dissipating on January 21 in the next year, on the Australian region. Oscar ended the 1993 season, dissipating on January 9 near the coast of the Western Australia.

=== South Pacific Ocean ===
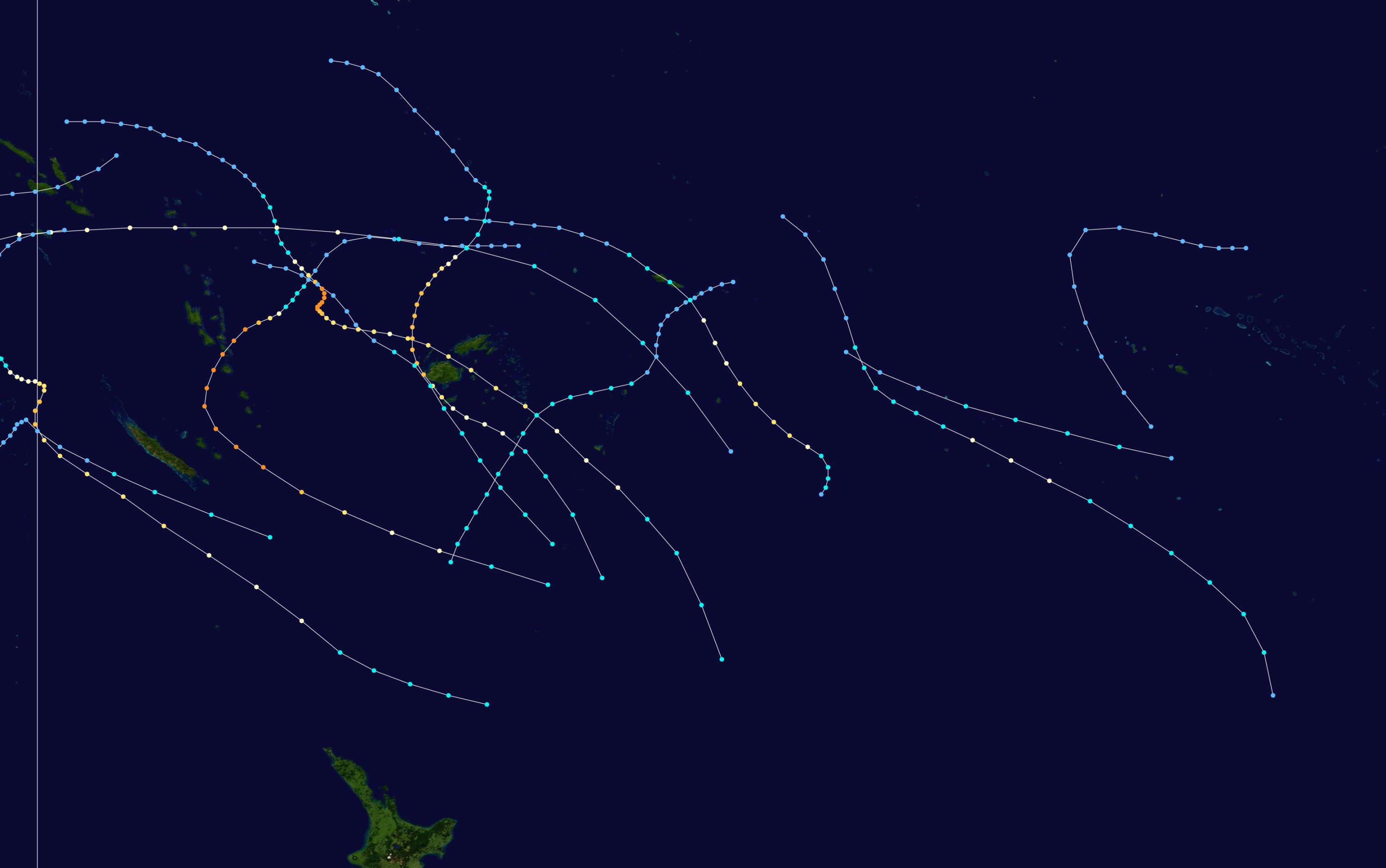
1992–93 South Pacific cyclone season summary Map

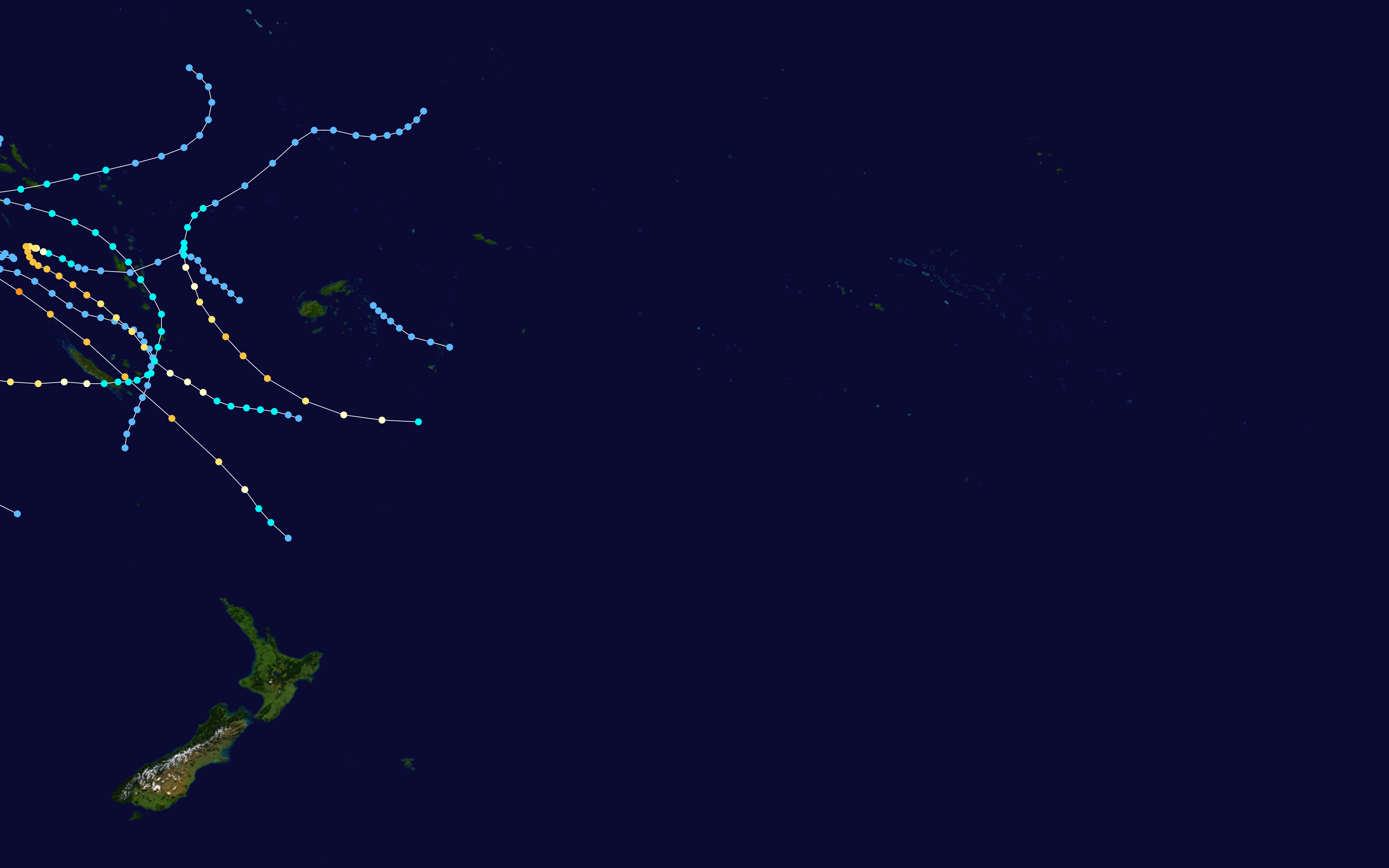
1993–94 South Pacific cyclone season summary Map

== Systems ==
=== January ===
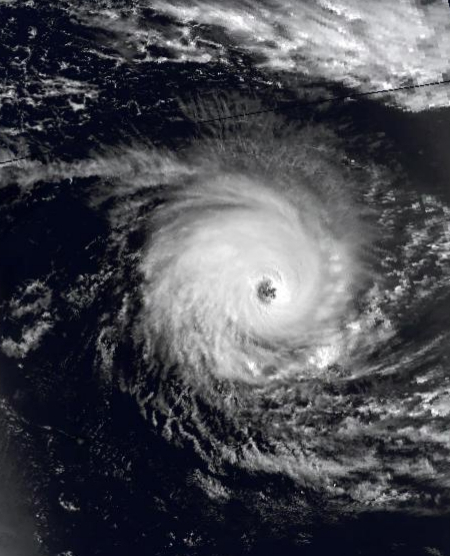
Cyclone Edwina

In January 1993, seven cyclones formed within their respective basins. The strongest cyclone of the season was Cyclone Edwina, which affected the islands of Rodrigues, Mauritius, and Réunion; however, it caused no impacts throughout its life. Cyclone Colina and Tropical Storm Dessilia also existed during this time, with the former affecting the Mascarene Islands and Seychelles as a tropical cyclone, killing two.

In the Australian region, only Cyclone Lena formed during this month, affecting Western Australia. Towards the South Pacific basin, three cyclones existed during the month including two tropical depressions and Lin. Lin was a tropical cyclone that affected the Samoan Islands, Niue, Fiji, and Tonga, causing an unknown number of damages and deaths.

Tropical cyclones formed in January 1993
| Storm name | Dates active | Max wind km/h (mph) | Pressure (hPa) | Areas affected | Damage (USD) | Deaths | Refs |
|---|---|---|---|---|---|---|---|
| 08P | January 1–3 | 85 (50) | Not specified | Cook Islands | None | None | |
| 09P | January 11–14 | Not specified | Not specified | French Polynesia | None | None | |
| Colina | January 13–20 | 135 (85) | 970 | Mascarene Islands, Seychelles | Unknown | 2 | |
| Dessilia | January 16–24 | 95 (60) | 975 | Juan de Nova Island, Madagascar, Réunion | Unknown | Unknown | |
| Edwina | January 19–29 | 170 (105) | 925 | Île Amsterdam | None | None | |
| Lena | January 22 – February 2 | 100 (65) | 972 | Western Australia | Unknown | None | |
| Lin | January 30 – February 5 | 120 (75) | 970 | Samoan Islands, Fiji, Niue, Tonga | Unknown | Unknown | |

=== February ===
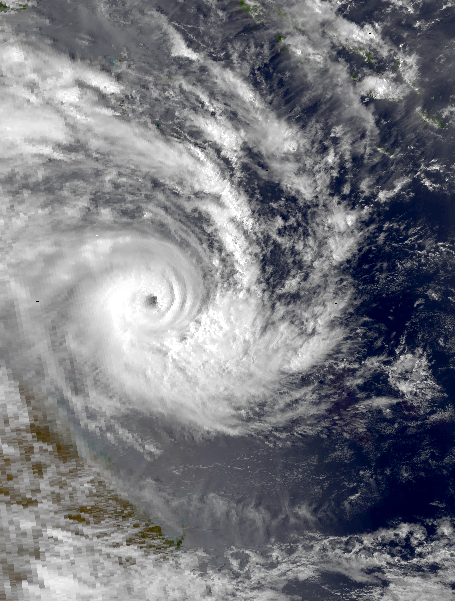
Cyclone Oliver

Tropical cyclones formed in February 1993
| Storm name | Dates active | Max wind km/h (mph) | Pressure (hPa) | Areas affected | Damage (USD) | Deaths | Refs |
|---|---|---|---|---|---|---|---|
| Oliver | February 3 – 14 | 185 (115) | 950 | Papua New Guinea, Far North Queensland | Unknown | Unknown | |
| Mick | February 3 – 9 | 85 (50) | 987 | Fiji, Samoan Islands, New Zealand, Tonga | Minimal | Unknown | |
| Nisha | February 9 – 16 | 110 (70) | 975 | Cook Islands | None | None | |
| Finella | February 12 – 15 | 80 (50) | 984 | Mascarene Islands | None | None | |
| Oli | February 14 – 20 | 75 (45) | 990 | Vanuatu, Fiji | Unknown | Unknown | |
| Gracia | February 20 – 23 | 70 (45) | 990 | Mayotte, Madagascar | Unknown | None | |
| H1 | February 24 – 26 | Not specified | Not specified | None | None | | |
| Hutelle | February 27 – March 2 | Not specified | Not specified | Réunion, Madagascar | None | None | |
| Polly | February 27 – March 9 | 155 (100) | 945 | Solomon Islands, New Caledonia, New Zealand | Unknown | Unknown | |
| 01W (Atring) | February 28 – March 1 | 55 (35) | 1010 | Philippines | None | None | |

=== March ===
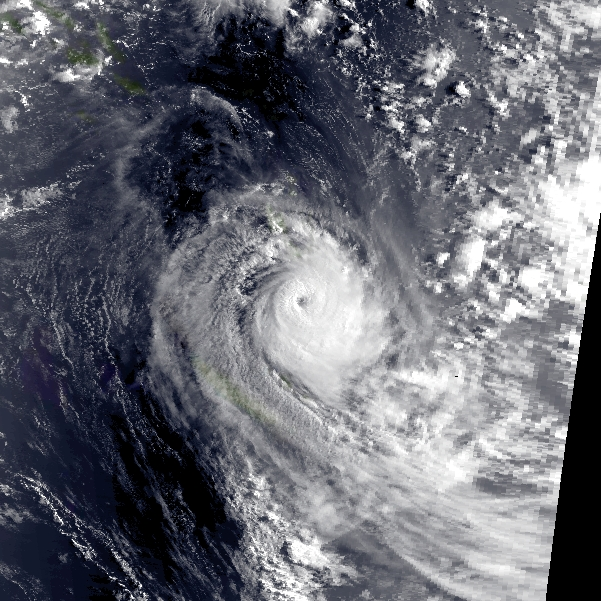
Cyclone Prema

Tropical cyclones formed in March 1993
| Storm name | Dates active | Max wind km/h (mph) | Pressure (hPa) | Areas affected | Damage (USD) | Deaths | Refs |
|---|---|---|---|---|---|---|---|
| Ionia | March 2–7 | 65 (40) | 993 | Madagascar | Minimal | 8 | |
| Irma | March 7–17 | 95 (60) | 985 | None | None | None | |
| Roger | March 12–20 | 110 (70) | 980 | None | None | None | |
| Prema | March 24 – April 6 | 185 (115) | 940 | Vanuatu, New Caledonia | $5 million | 3 | |

=== April ===
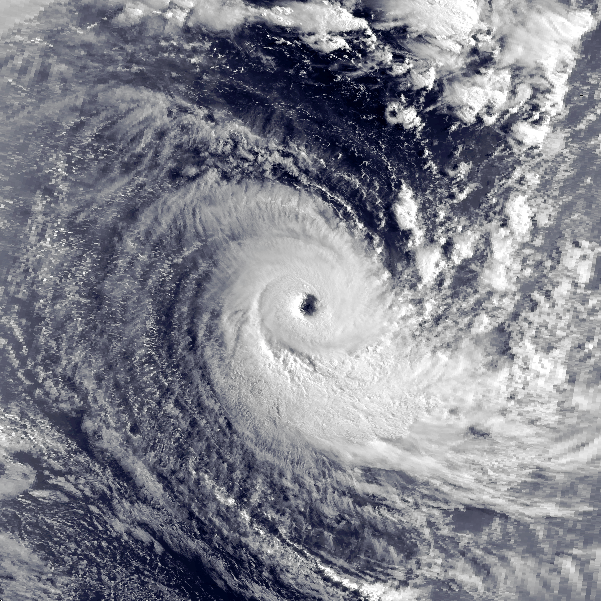
Cyclone Jourdanne

Tropical cyclones formed in April 1993
| Storm name | Dates active | Max wind km/h (mph) | Pressure (hPa) | Areas affected | Damage (USD) | Deaths | Refs |
|---|---|---|---|---|---|---|---|
| Jourdanne | April 2–10 | 165 (105) | 930 | None | None | None | |
| Monty | April 6–13 | 110 (70) | 992 | None | None | None | |
| Bining | April 9–13 | 55 (35) | 1002 | Caroline Islands, Philippines | None | None | |
| Kuring | April 19–26 | 55 (35) | 1008 | Caroline Islands, Philippines | None | None | |

=== May ===
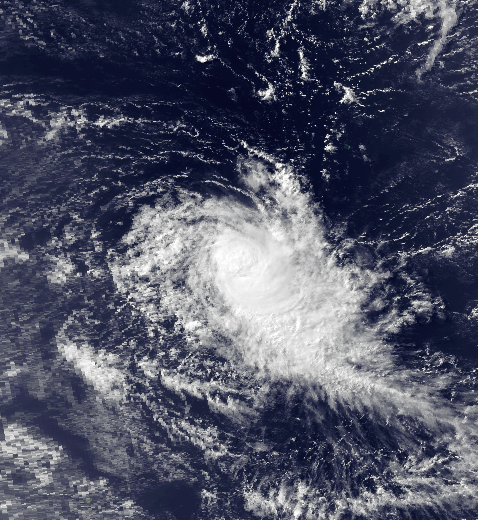
Cyclone Konita

Tropical cyclones formed in May 1993
| Storm name | Dates active | Max wind km/h (mph) | Pressure (hPa) | Areas affected | Damage (USD) | Deaths | Refs |
|---|---|---|---|---|---|---|---|
| Konita | May 2–7 | 130 (80) | 955 | None | None | None | |
| Daling | May 2–4 | 45 (30) | 1006 | Philippines | None | None | |
| Adel | May 11–16 | 120 (70) | 970 | Papua New Guinea | Minimal | 3 | |
| Jack | May 16–22 | 65 (40) | 1008 | Caroline Islands, Mariana Islands | None | None | |
| One | May 31 – June 2 | 55 (35) | 999 | Cuba, Jamaica, Haiti, Florida, The Bahamas | Unknown | 20 | |

=== June ===
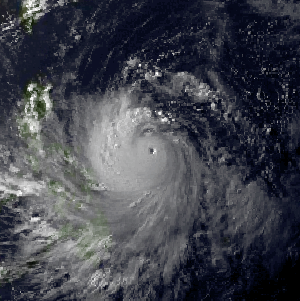
Typhoon Koryn

Tropical cyclones formed in June 1993
| Storm name | Dates active | Max wind km/h (mph) | Pressure (hPa) | Areas affected | Damage (USD) | Deaths | Refs |
|---|---|---|---|---|---|---|---|
| Adrian | June 11–19 | 130 (80) | 979 | None | None | None | |
| Koryn (Goring) | June 16–29 | 195 (120) | 905 | Caroline Islands, Philippines, China | $224 million | 37 | |
| Elang | June 17–20 | 55 (35) | 1008 | Philippines | None | None | |
| BOB 01 | June 17–19 | 55 (35) | 988 | India, Bangladesh | Heavy | 200 | |
| Arlene | June 18–21 | 65 (40) | 1000 | Central America, Mexico, Gulf Coast of the United States | $60.8 million | 26 | |
| Beatriz | June 18–20 | 100 (65) | 995 | Southwestern Mexico | Unknown | 6 | |
| Three-E | June 27 – July 2 | 55 (35) | 1006 | Southwestern Mexico, Baja California Sur | Minimal | None | |

=== July ===
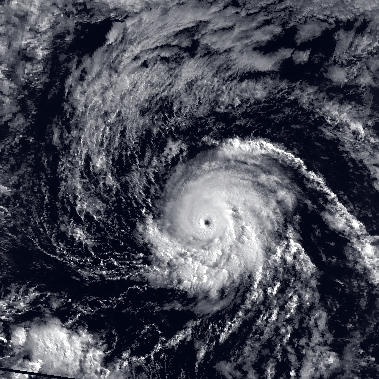
Hurricane Dora

Tropical cyclones formed in July 1993
| Storm name | Dates active | Max wind km/h (mph) | Pressure (hPa) | Areas affected | Damage (USD) | Deaths | Refs |
|---|---|---|---|---|---|---|---|
| Calvin | July 4–9 | 175 (110) | 966 | Western Mexico, Baja California Sur | $32 million | 37 | |
| Lewis (Huling) | July 7–13 | 95 (60) | 985 | Philippines, South China, Vietnam | Unknown | Unknown | |
| TD | July 13 | Unknown | 1002 | South China | None | None | |
| Marian (Ibiang) | July 14–16 | 75 (45) | 1000 | None | None | None | |
| Dora | July 14–21 | 215 (130) | 945 | None | None | None | |
| Eugene | July 15–25 | 205 (125) | 948 | None | None | None | |
| TD | July 17–22 | Unknown | 1008 | None | None | None | |
| Nathan | July 19–25 | 100 (65) | 980 | Mariana Islands, Japan | Unknown | Unknown | |
| TD | July 21 | Unknown | 1008 | None | None | None | |
| Ofelia (Luming) | July 24–27 | 85 (50) | 990 | Japan | Unknown | Unknown | |
| Percy (Miling) | July 27–30 | 100 (65) | 980 | Mariana Islands, Japan | Unknown | Unknown | |
| Narsing | July 30–31 | 55 (35) | 1000 | None | None | None | |
| TD | July 31 | Unknown | 1002 | Philippines, Taiwan | None | None | |

=== August ===
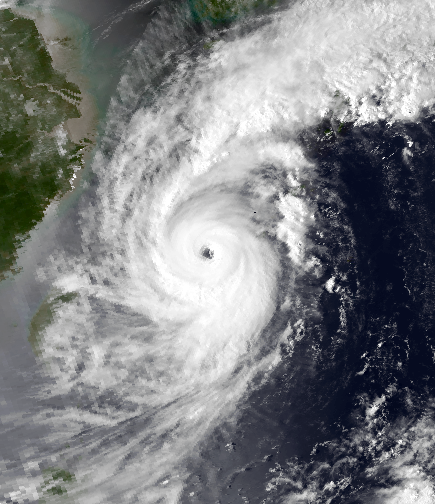
Typhoon Yancy

Tropical cyclones formed in August 1993
| Storm name | Dates active | Max wind km/h (mph) | Pressure (hPa) | Areas affected | Damage (USD) | Deaths | Refs |
|---|---|---|---|---|---|---|---|
| Robyn (Openg) | August 1–11 | 155 (100) | 940 | Caroline Islands, Mariana Islands, Japan, South Korea | $68 million | 45 | |
| Keoni | August 9 – September 1 | 165 (105) | 940 | None | None | None | |
| Fernanda | August 9–19 | 230 (145) | 934 | Hawaii | $5 million | None | |
| Bret | August 4–11 | 65 (40) | 1000 | Trinidad and Tobago, Grenada, ABC islands, Venezuela, Colombia, Central America | $37.5 million | 213 | |
| Steve (Pining) | August 6–14 | 100 (65) | 980 | Mariana Islands, Ryukyu Islands | None | None | |
| 15W | August 13–14 | 45 (30) | 1002 | Marshall Islands | None | None | |
| Tasha (Rubing) | August 15–22 | 120 (75) | 970 | Philippines, China | None | None | |
| Cindy | August 14–17 | 75 (45) | 1007 | Lesser Antilles, Puerto Rico, Dominican Republic | $19 million | 4 | |
| Greg | August 15–28 | 215 (130) | 948 | None | None | None | |
| Hillary | August 17–27 | 195 (120) | 957 | Baja California Sur, California, Iowa | None | None | |
| Vernon | August 21–28 | 140 (85) | 960 | Japan | Minimal | 2 | |
| Winona (Saling) | August 22–29 | 75 (45) | 990 | Philippines, Vietnam | Unknown | Unknown | |
| Irwin | August 21–22 | 110 (70) | 999 | Southwestern Mexico | None | None | |
| Emily | August 22 – September 6 | 185 (115) | 960 | East Coast of the United States, Bermuda | $35 million | 3 | |
| TD | August 23–25 | | 1002 | Mariana Islands | None | None | |
| Dennis | August 23–28 | 85 (50) | 1000 | None | None | None | |
| Yancy (Tasing) | August 29 – September 4 | 175 (110) | 925 | Japan | $1.67 billion | 48 | |
| Jova | August 29 – September 5 | 215 (130) | 948 | Southwestern Mexico | None | None | |

=== September ===
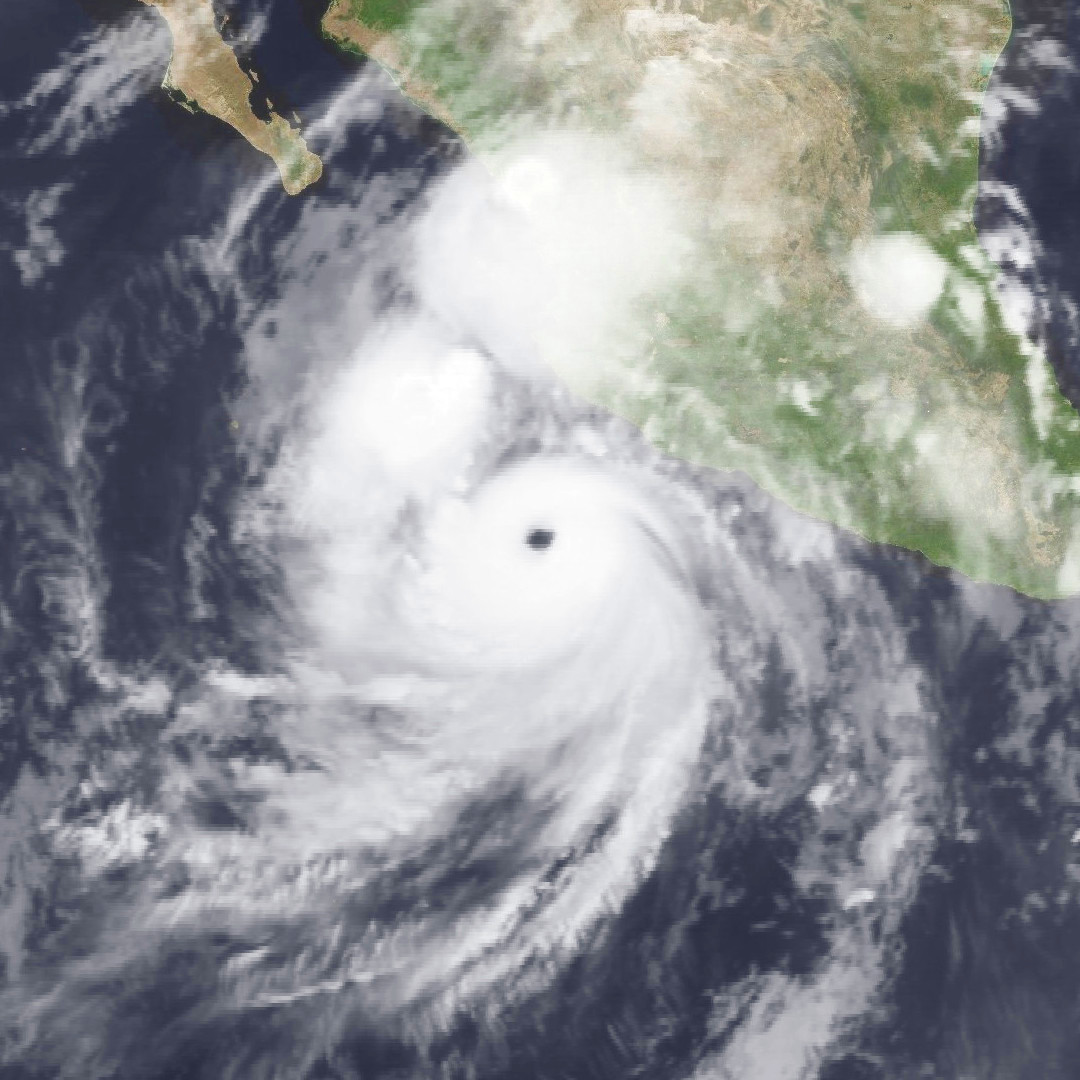
Hurricane Lidia

Tropical cyclones formed in February 1993
| Storm name | Dates active | Max wind km/h (mph) | Pressure (hPa) | Areas affected | Damage (USD) | Deaths | Refs |
|---|---|---|---|---|---|---|---|
| Zola (Unsing) | September 5–9 | 95 (60) | 985 | Japan | None | None | |
| Kenneth | September 5–17 | 240 (150) | 932 | None | None | None | |
| Floyd | September 7–10 | 120 (75) | 990 | Newfoundland and Labrador | Minimal | None | |
| TD | September 7–8 | | 1006 | Philippines | None | None | |
| Lidia | September 8–14 | 240 (150) | 930 | Southwestern Mexico, California | $8 million | 7 | |
| Abe (Walding) | September 9–15 | 155 (100) | 940 | Philippines, Taiwan, China | Unknown | None | |
| Becky (Yeyeng) | September 13–18 | 120 (75) | 980 | Philippines, South China | None | 1 | |
| Gert | September 14–21 | 155 (100) | 970 | Central America, Mexico | $170 million | 116 | |
| Harvey | September 18–21 | 120 (75) | 990 | None | None | None | |
| Dot (Anding) | September 20–27 | 140 (85) | 965 | Philippines, China | Unknown | None | |
| Fourteen-E | September 21–25 | 55 (35) | 1002 | Southwestern Mexico | None | None | |
| Cecil | September 23–27 | 155 (100) | 940 | Mariana Islands | None | None | |
| Binang | September 25 | | 1004 | None | None | None | |
| Ten | September 29–30 | 55 (35) | 1008 | None | None | None | |
| Max | September 30 – October 4 | 75 (45) | 1000 | None | None | None | |

=== October ===
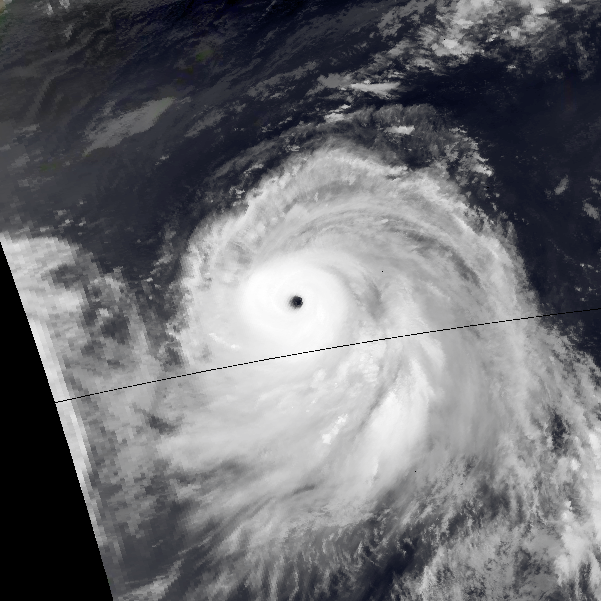
Typhoon Ed

Tropical cyclones formed in October 1993
| Storm name | Dates active | Max wind km/h (mph) | Pressure (hPa) | Areas affected | Damage (USD) | Deaths | Refs |
|---|---|---|---|---|---|---|---|
| Ed (Dinang) | October 1–8 | 185 (115) | 915 | Caroline Islands, Mariana Islands | None | None | |
| Flo (Kadiang) | October 1–8 | 120 (75) | 970 | Philippines, Ryukyu Islands | $188 million | 576 | |
| Norma | October 2–6 | 75 (45) | 1000 | None | None | None | |
| Epang | October 6–13 | 45 (30) | 1002 | Philippines, South China | None | None | |
| Gene (Gundang) | October 7–10 | 65 (40) | 998 | Caroline Islands | None | None | |
| Seventeen-E | October 11–14 | 55 (35) | 1009 | None | None | None | |
| Hattie | October 19–25 | 95 (60) | 980 | Marshall Islands | None | None | |
| TD | October 22 | | 992 | None | None | None | |
| Ira (Husing) | October 27 – November 5 | 150 (90) | 950 | Caroline Islands, Mariana Islands, Philippines, China | Unknown | Unknown | |

=== November ===
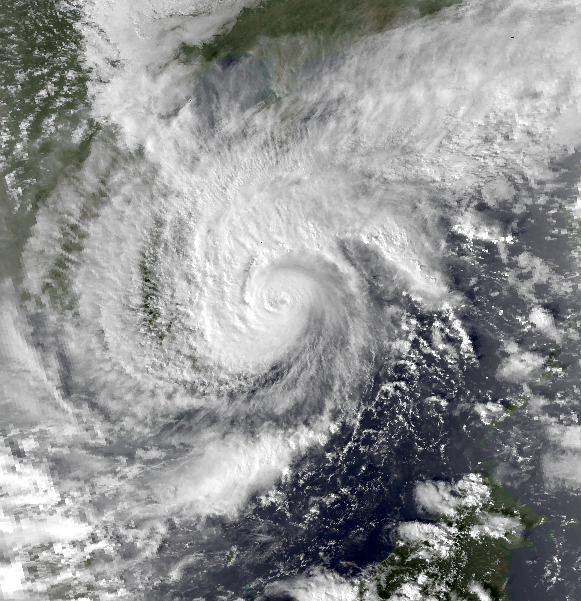
Typhoon Kyle

Tropical cyclones formed in November 1993
| Storm name | Dates active | Max wind km/h (mph) | Pressure (hPa) | Areas affected | Damage (USD) | Deaths | Refs |
|---|---|---|---|---|---|---|---|
| Jeana | November 5–10 | 85 (50) | 992 | Caroline Islands | None | None | |
| ARB 01/02 | November 8–16 | 120 (75) | 986 | India, Pakistan | Unknown | 644 | |
| Alexina | November 9–14 | 85 (50) | 982 | None | None | None | |
| Indang | November 12–13 | 45 (30) | 1008 | Philippines | None | None | |
| 32W | November 13–16 | 45 (30) | 1002 | Caroline Islands | None | None | |
| 33W | November 17–19 | 45 (30) | 1002 | Marshall Islands | None | None | |
| Bettina | November 25 – December 2 | 110 (70) | 970 | None | None | None | |
| Kyle (Luring) | November 17–24 | 130 (80) | 960 | Philippines, Vietnam, Cambodia | $1.5 million | 110 | |

=== December ===
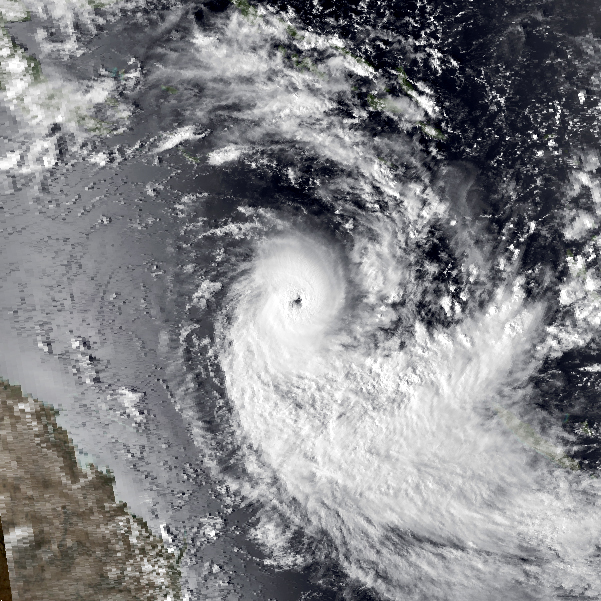
Cyclone Rewa

Tropical cyclones formed in December 1993
| Storm name | Dates active | Max wind km/h (mph) | Pressure (hPa) | Areas affected | Damage (USD) | Deaths | Refs |
|---|---|---|---|---|---|---|---|
| BOB 02 | December 1–4 | 165 (105) | 968 | India | $216 million | 70 | |
| Lola (Monang) | December 1–9 | 150 (90) | 955 | Caroline Islands, Philippines, Vietnam, Cambodia | $261 million | 370 | |
| Manny (Naning) | December 3–16 | 140 (85) | 955 | Philippines, Vietnam, Thailand | $50 million | 245 | |
| Cecilia | December 12–21 | 100 (65) | 972 | Mauritius | None | None | |
| Oning | December 14–16 | 55 (35) | 1004 | Philippines | None | None | |
| Naomi | December 14–18 | 140 (85) | 960 | Western Australia | Minimal | None | |
| BOB 03 | December 19–20 | 55 (35) | 1006 | Southern India | None | None | |
| Nell (Puring) | December 21–31 | 110 (70) | 975 | Philippines | None | None | |
| Rewa | December 26, 1993 – January 23, 1994 | 205 (125) | 920 | Melanesia, Eastern Australia, New Zealand | Unknown | 20 | |
| Oscar | December 28, 1993 – January 9, 1994 | 65 (40) | 995 | Northern Territory, Western Australia | None | None | |

== Global effects ==
There are a total of seven tropical cyclone basins that tropical cyclones typically form in this table, data from all these basins are added.

| Season name | | Areas affected | Systems formed | Named storms | Hurricane-force tropical cyclones | Damage (1995 USD) | Deaths | Ref. |
|---|---|---|---|---|---|---|---|---|
| North Atlantic Ocean (Note: The wind speeds for this tropical cyclone/basin are based on the Saffir Simpson Scale which uses 1-minute sustained winds.) | | Greater Antilles, Southeastern United States, East Coast of the United States, Atlantic Canada, Gulf Coast of the United States, Central America, Yucatan Peninsula | 10 | 8 | 4 | $322.3 million | 382 | |
| Eastern and Central Pacific Ocean | | Baja California Peninsula, Southwestern Mexico, Hawaii | 17 | 15 | 11 | $45 million | 51 | |
| Western Pacific Ocean (Note: Only systems that formed either before or on December 31, 1993 are counted in the seasonal totals.) | | Marshall Islands, Caroline Islands, Ryukyu Islands, South China, Philippines, Taiwan, Vietnam, Korean Peninsula, Laos, Thailand, Mariana Islands, Japan, Cambodia | 49 | 27 | 20 | $3.79 billion | 1,743 | |
| North Indian Ocean (Note: The wind speeds for this tropical cyclone/basin are based on the IMD Scale which uses 3-minute sustained winds.) | | South Asia | 4 | 2 | 2 | $216 million | 914 | |
| South-West Indian Ocean | January – June (Note: Only systems that formed either on or after January 1, 1993 are counted in the seasonal totals.) (Note: The wind speeds for this tropical cyclone are based on Météo-France, which uses wind gusts.) | Madagascar, Mauritius, Réunion, Agaléga | 10 | 8 | 5 | Unknown | Unknown | |
| South-West Indian Ocean | July – December | —N/a | 4 | 3 | 2 | Unknown | —N/a | |
| Australian region | January – June | Western Australia, Christmas Island, Cocos (Keeling) Islands | 6 | 6 | 2 | Unknown | —N/a | |
| Australian region | July – December | Christmas Island, Western Australia | 2 | 2 | 1 | Unknown | —N/a | |
| South Pacific Ocean | January – June | 7 | 5 | 3 | —N/a | Unknown | —N/a | |
| South Pacific Ocean | July – December | Australia | 1 | 1 | 1 | Unknown | —N/a | |
| Worldwide | | (See above) | 108 (Note: The sum of the number of systems in each basin will not equal the number shown as the total. This is because when systems move between basins, it creates a discrepancy in the actual number of systems.) | 75 | 48 | $4.37 billion | 3,090 | |

== See also ==
- Tropical cyclones by year
- List of earthquakes in 1996
- Tornadoes of 1993

== Notes ==
^{2} Only systems that formed either on or after January 1, 1993 are counted in the seasonal totals.
^{3} Only systems that formed either before or on December 31, 1993 are counted in the seasonal totals.
^{4} The wind speeds for this tropical cyclone/basin are based on the IMD Scale which uses 3-minute sustained winds.
^{5} The wind speeds for this tropical cyclone/basin are based on the Saffir Simpson Scale which uses 1-minute sustained winds.
^{6}The wind speeds for this tropical cyclone are based on Météo-France which uses wind gusts.
