= List of storms named Koryn =

The name Koryn has been used for two tropical cyclones in the northwest Pacific Ocean.

- Typhoon Koryn (1990) (T9001, 01W)
- Typhoon Koryn (1993) (T9302, 06W) – struck the Philippines and China.
