= Cyclone Prema =

South Pacific cyclone in 1993

Severe Tropical Cyclone Prema
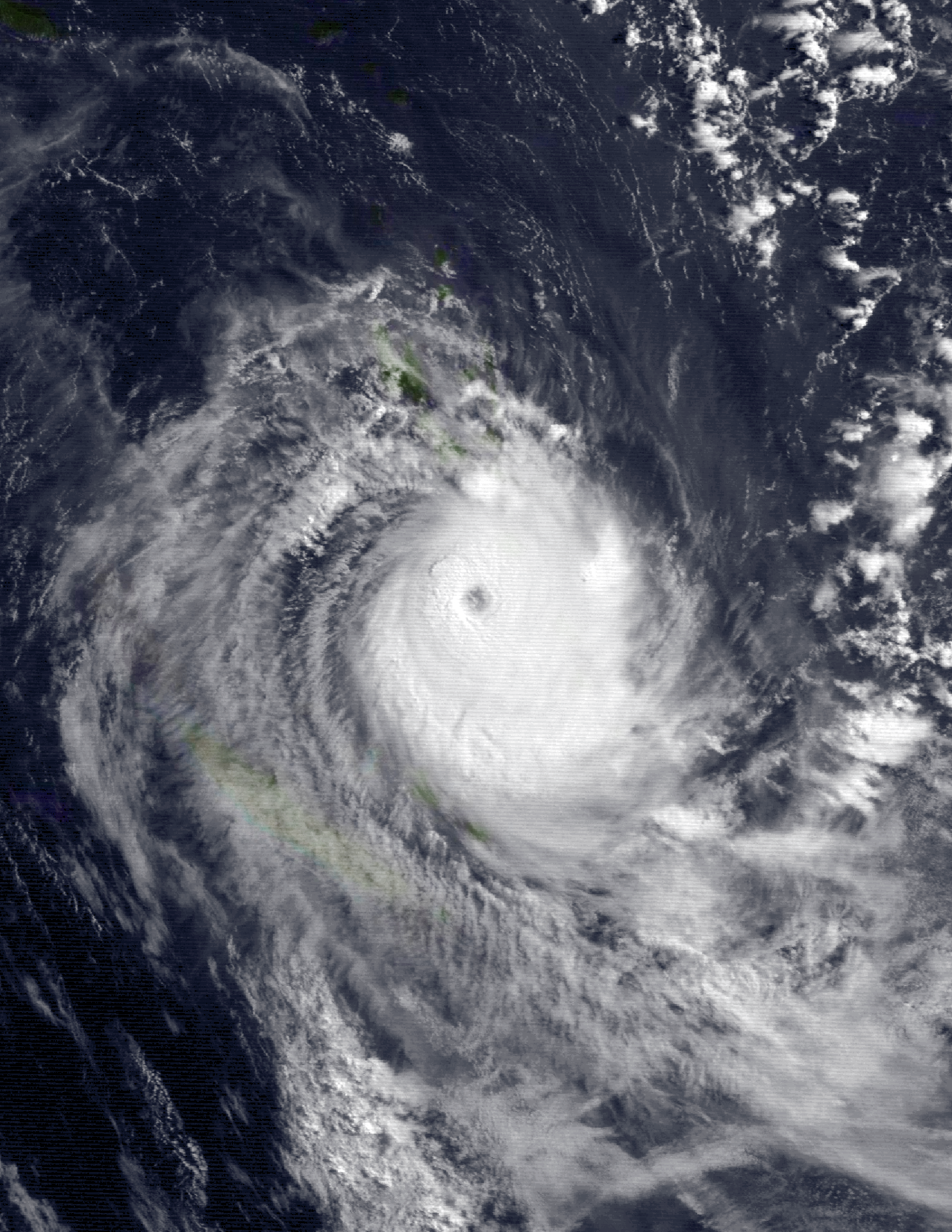
- Cyclone Prema west of Vanuatu at peak intensity on 29 March

Meteorological history
- Formed: 26 March 1993
- Dissipated: 6 April 1993

Category 4 severe tropical cyclone
- 10-minute sustained (FMS)
- Highest winds: 165 km/h (105 mph)
- Lowest pressure: 940 hPa (mbar); 27.76 inHg

Category 4-equivalent tropical cyclone
- 1-minute sustained (SSHWS/JTWC)
- Highest winds: 230 km/h (145 mph)
- Lowest pressure: 916 hPa (mbar); 27.05 inHg

Overall effects
- Fatalities: 3
- Damage: $5 million (1993 USD)
- Areas affected: Vanuatu, New Caledonia
- IBTrACS
- Part of the 1992–93 South Pacific cyclone season

Severe Tropical Cyclone Prema was the twenty-third storm of the season, Prema formed early on 26 March 1993 as a weak tropical depression.

== Meteorological history ==
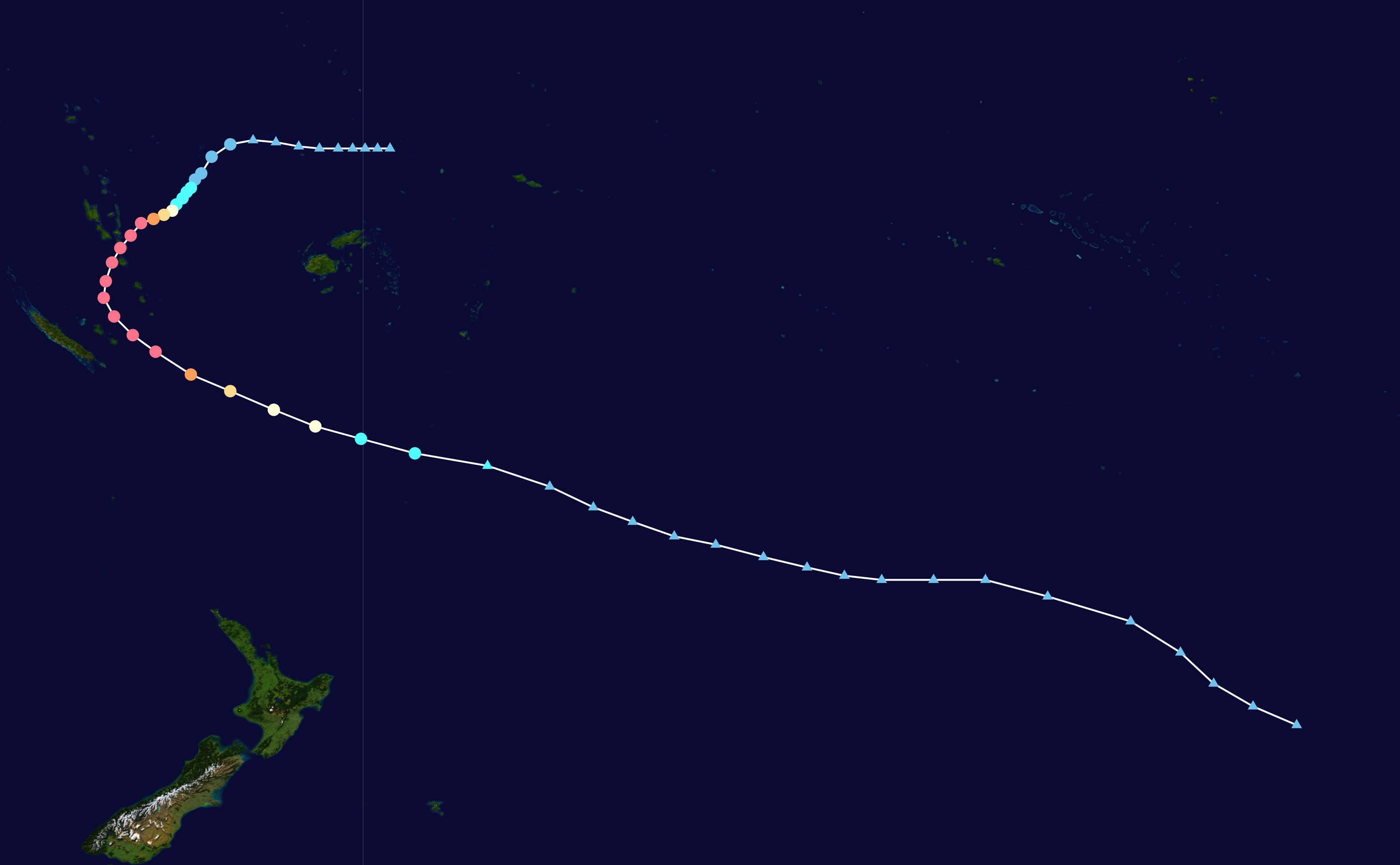
Map plotting the storm's track and intensity, according to the Saffir–Simpson scale Map key Saffir–Simpson scale Tropical depression (≤38 mph, ≤62 km/h) Tropical storm (39–73 mph, 63–118 km/h) Category 1 (74–95 mph, 119–153 km/h) Category 2 (96–110 mph, 154–177 km/h) Category 3 (111–129 mph, 178–208 km/h) Category 4 (130–156 mph, 209–251 km/h) Category 5 (≥157 mph, ≥252 km/h) Unknown Storm type Tropical cyclone Subtropical cyclone Extratropical cyclone, remnant low, tropical disturbance, or monsoon depression

On 25 March, a tropical depression had developed within an otherwise inactive monsoon trough, about 200 km (125 mi) to the west of the Fijian dependency of Rotuma. A passing high-pressure area assisted the tropical depression's genesis under an upper-level ridge near Vanuatu. On 26 March, the system initially moved north-westwards, before it turned and moved south-westwards as it organised and developed further. The depression moved towards the northwest before it turned and started to move southwest as it gradually developed further. On 27 March, both the Nadi TCWC and the Joint Typhoon Warning Center reported that the depression had developed into a tropical cyclone and the Nadi TCWC named it Prema.

== Effects ==
In Vanuatu, Cyclone Prema affected 20,000 people and caused an estimated US$60 million in damages. A gauge in Port Vila was damaged and inoperable for over 18 months.

Due to the impact of this system, the name Prema was retired by the World Meteorological Organization's RA V Tropical Cyclone Committee.

== See also ==
- Tropical cyclones in 1993
