= Typhoon Sally (1996) =

Pacific typhoon in 1996

Typhoon Sally (Maring)
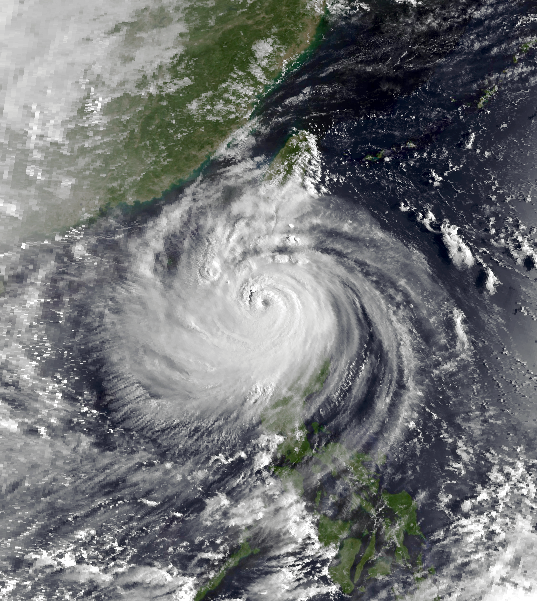
- Sally prior to peak intensity near the Philippines on 7 September

Meteorological history
- Formed: 2 September 1996
- Dissipated: 9 September 1996

Very strong typhoon
- 10-minute sustained (JMA)
- Highest winds: 155 km/h (100 mph)
- Lowest pressure: 935 hPa (mbar); 27.61 inHg

Category 5-equivalent super typhoon
- 1-minute sustained (SSHWS/JTWC)
- Highest winds: 260 km/h (160 mph)
- Lowest pressure: 898 hPa (mbar); 26.52 inHg

Overall effects
- Fatalities: 140 total (estimated)
- Missing: 130
- Damage: $1.5 billion (1996 USD)
- Areas affected: Philippines; China; Vietnam
- IBTrACS
- Part of the 1996 Pacific typhoon season

Typhoon Sally, known in the Philippines as Super Typhoon Maring, was an intense tropical cyclone that caused widespread damage across southeastern Asia, particularly in China, in September 1996. Forming well east of the Philippines on 5 September, Sally quickly intensified as it tracked westward within favorable conditions. The system reached tropical storm intensity several hours after tropical cyclogenesis was completed, and strengthened further into typhoon intensity the following day. On 7 September, Sally reached super typhoon status shortly before attaining its peak intensity with maximum sustained winds of 260 km/h (160 mph) and a barometric pressure of 940 mbar (hPa; 27.76 inHg). Quickly moving across the South China Sea, Sally substantially weakened but remained a strong typhoon before making its first landfall on the Leizhou Peninsula on 9 September. The tropical cyclone's trek brought it briefly over the Gulf of Tonkin before making a final landfall near the border of China and Vietnam. The typhoon rapidly deteriorated inland and dissipated later that day.

== Meteorological history ==
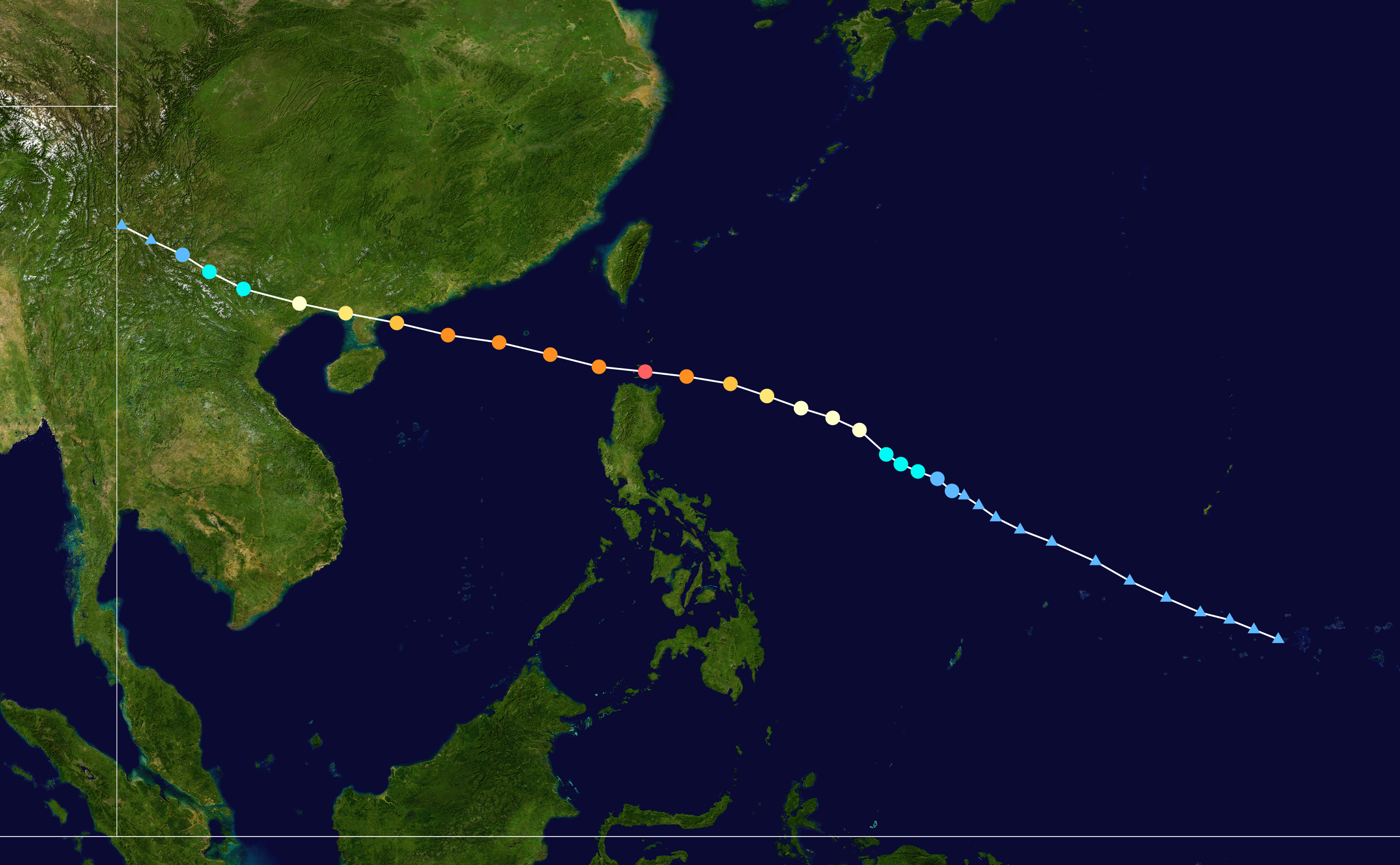
Map plotting the storm's track and intensity, according to the Saffir–Simpson scale Map key Saffir–Simpson scale Tropical depression (≤38 mph, ≤62 km/h) Tropical storm (39–73 mph, 63–118 km/h) Category 1 (74–95 mph, 119–153 km/h) Category 2 (96–110 mph, 154–177 km/h) Category 3 (111–129 mph, 178–208 km/h) Category 4 (130–156 mph, 209–251 km/h) Category 5 (≥157 mph, ≥252 km/h) Unknown Storm type Tropical cyclone Subtropical cyclone Extratropical cyclone, remnant low, tropical disturbance, or monsoon depression

In early September 1996, the monsoonal wind flow pattern shifted to a zone extending from the Philippines to Micronesia, in contrast to an anomalous pattern the month prior. On 2 September, an area of deep atmospheric convection within this zone began to consolidate into a tropical disturbance near Guam. At this time, the Joint Typhoon Warning Center (JTWC) began to monitor the system. Tracking northwestward, the disturbance steadily organized. Early on 4 September, analysis showed that the system had developed a well-defined low-level circulation center. At 0000 UTC the following day, the JTWC upgraded the low-pressure area to tropical depression intensity, while the storm system was situated roughly 1,300 km (810 mi) east of Manila in the Philippines. The rate of intensification quickened during the day, and at 1800 UTC the depression intensified into tropical storm strength, earning it the name Sally.

Tracking north-northwestward, Sally attained typhoon intensity by 0600 UTC on 6 September. At the time, the typhoon had a minimum barometric pressure of 990 mbar (hPa; 29.24 inHg) according to the Japan Meteorological Agency (JMA). Rapid intensification followed shortly afterwards, with the typhoon reaching the equivalent of Category 3 intensity by 0600 UTC on 7 September. Ten hours later, the JTWC upgraded Sally to super typhoon status. (Note: A super typhoon is an unofficial classification used by the Joint Typhoon Warning Center to classify tropical cyclones in the Northwestern Pacific with 1-minute sustained winds in excess of 240 km/h (150 mph).) At 1800 UTC, the JTWC assessed Sally to have peaked in strength with maximum sustained winds of 260 km/h (160 mph), equivalent to that of a Category 5 tropical cyclone on the Saffir–Simpson hurricane wind scale. The JMA estimated the storm's minimum pressure at the time to be at 950 mbar (950 hPa; 28 inHg). The following morning, Sally accelerated into the South China Sea under the influence of a strong subtropical ridge to the north. Despite its movement over waters, the typhoon steadily weakened as it tracked westward. On 9 September, Sally made landfall on China's Leizhou Peninsula with winds of 185 km/h (115 mph). The typhoon briefly tracked over the Gulf of Tonkin before making a second and final landfall just north of the border between China and Vietnam. Upon moving inland, Sally quickly weakened before dissipating over southwestern China on 9 September.

== Preparations and impact ==
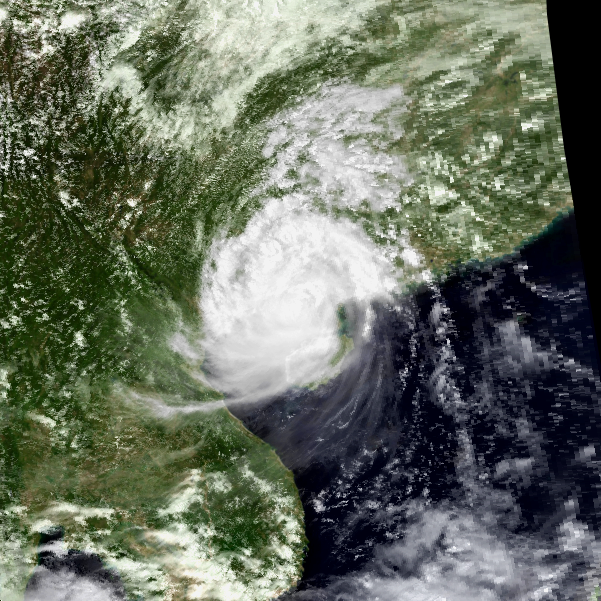
Image of Sally in the Gulf of Tonkin on 9 September

As Typhoon Sally approached Hong Kong on 8 September, precautionary measures were initiated in the then-British colony. Ferry service to Hong Kong's outlying islands were suspended, while active fishing vessels sought shelter in the local harbor. The Hong Kong Observatory (HKO) began issuing warning systems for Hong Kong and adjacent areas beginning with a Standby Signal No. 1 early that day, while Sally was located roughly 770 km (480 mi) to the east-southeast. As the typhoon strengthened and rapidly approached the Chinese coast, the HKO issued the Strong Wind Signal No. 3 that evening. In the early morning hours of 9 September, Sally made its closest pass to Hong Kong as it moved 180 km (110 mi) off to the south. As such, warnings were raised to the Southeast Gale or Storm Signal No. 8. The signal warning was raised a few hours late and continued to be held for just over 3 hours, the shortest period of time for which that warning was held since Tropical Storm Wynne in 1984. As effects from Sally subsided, the warning signals were downgraded until all warnings were discontinued shortly before noon on 9 September. Though the warnings for Hong Kong were lifted early, schools in the colony were suspended throughout 9 September.

As the typhoon approached the Chinese coast, two men became stranded on a cliff in Sok Kwu Wan as a result of the storm. Though they required aerial rescue via helicopter, both men only sustained minor injuries. Passing south of Hong Kong throughout 8–9 September, Sally remained sufficiently south of the province to not cause considerable damage. However, trees, scaffolding, and signboards were toppled by strong winds. A peak gust of 158 km/h (98 mph) was measured at a station in Tai Mo Shan. Precipitation remained light, though some localized flooding events were reported. The highest measured rainfall total in Hong Kong was 59 mm (2.3 in), though amounts greater than 60 mm (2.4 in) were estimated in some areas of the province. Two people were killed – one in Luk Chau village and another in Ma On Shan. In nearby Macau, trees were also uprooted, and low-lying areas were inundated by flooding conditions exacerbated by the high tides caused by Sally.

Overall in China, the effects of Sally were catastrophic, particularly in the provinces of Hainan, Guangdong and Guangxi. There, at least 140 people were known to have been killed by the typhoon, with an addition 130 unaccounted for and another 2,000 injured. An estimated 300,000 homes collapsed and 500,000 hectares (1.24 million acres) of farmland were damaged. Offshore, 60 vessels capsized in high winds. Overall economic losses from Sally were estimated at over ¥12 billion (US$1.5 billion), the largest loss for the region since 1954.

== See also ==
- Typhoon Koryn (1993)
- Typhoon Hagupit (2008)
- Typhoon Mangkhut (2018)
- Typhoon Yagi (2024)
- Typhoon Ragasa (2025)
