= Typhoon Koryn (1993) =

Pacific typhoon in 1993

Typhoon Koryn (Goring)
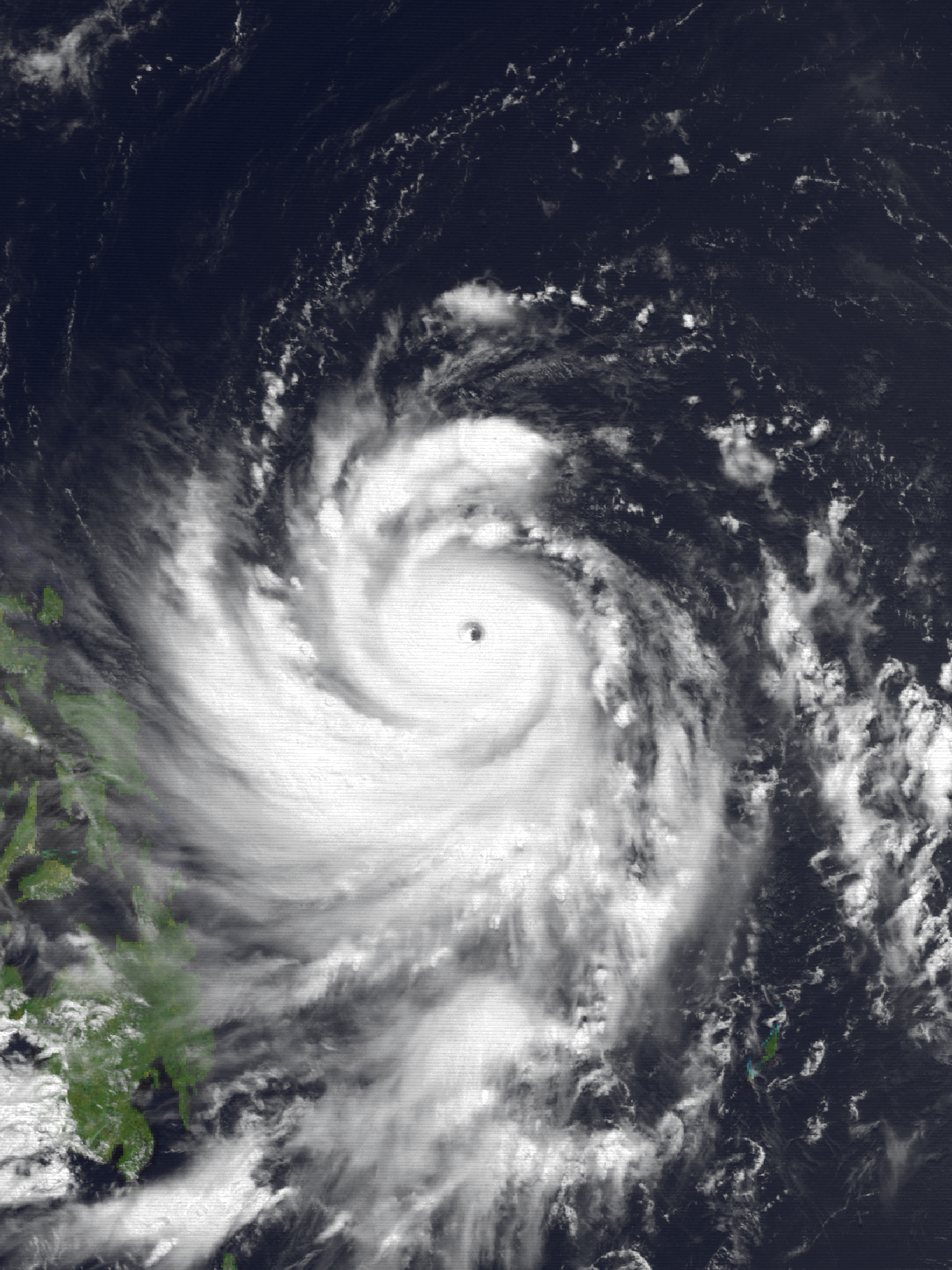
- Koryn prior to peak intensity on June 24

Meteorological history
- Formed: June 15, 1993
- Dissipated: June 29, 1993

Violent typhoon
- 10-minute sustained (JMA)
- Highest winds: 195 km/h (120 mph)
- Lowest pressure: 905 hPa (mbar); 26.72 inHg

Category 4-equivalent super typhoon
- 1-minute sustained (SSHWS/JTWC)
- Highest winds: 240 km/h (150 mph)
- Lowest pressure: 910 hPa (mbar); 26.87 inHg

Overall effects
- Fatalities: 37 direct
- Damage: $312 million (1993 USD)
- Areas affected: Caroline Islands, Philippines, China, Vietnam
- IBTrACS
- Part of the 1993 Pacific typhoon season

Typhoon Koryn, known as Goring in the Philippines, was a powerful tropical cyclone that impacted Philippines, Hong Kong, and China. It was the third named storm, first typhoon and super typhoon of the 1993 Pacific typhoon season. Koryn formed on June 13 and reached super typhoon status on June 26 with winds at 160 mph (260 km/h) and a barometric pressure of 900 millibars. Koryn caused 37 people dead and $312 million damage. It was the most intense tropical cyclone worldwide in 1993.

In the Philippines, the storm left $102 million damage and 28 people were reported dead. Many major roads in the Philippines were closed. In Hong Kong, 183 people were injured. The 12,522-ton freighter Lian Gang sank.

== Meteorological history ==
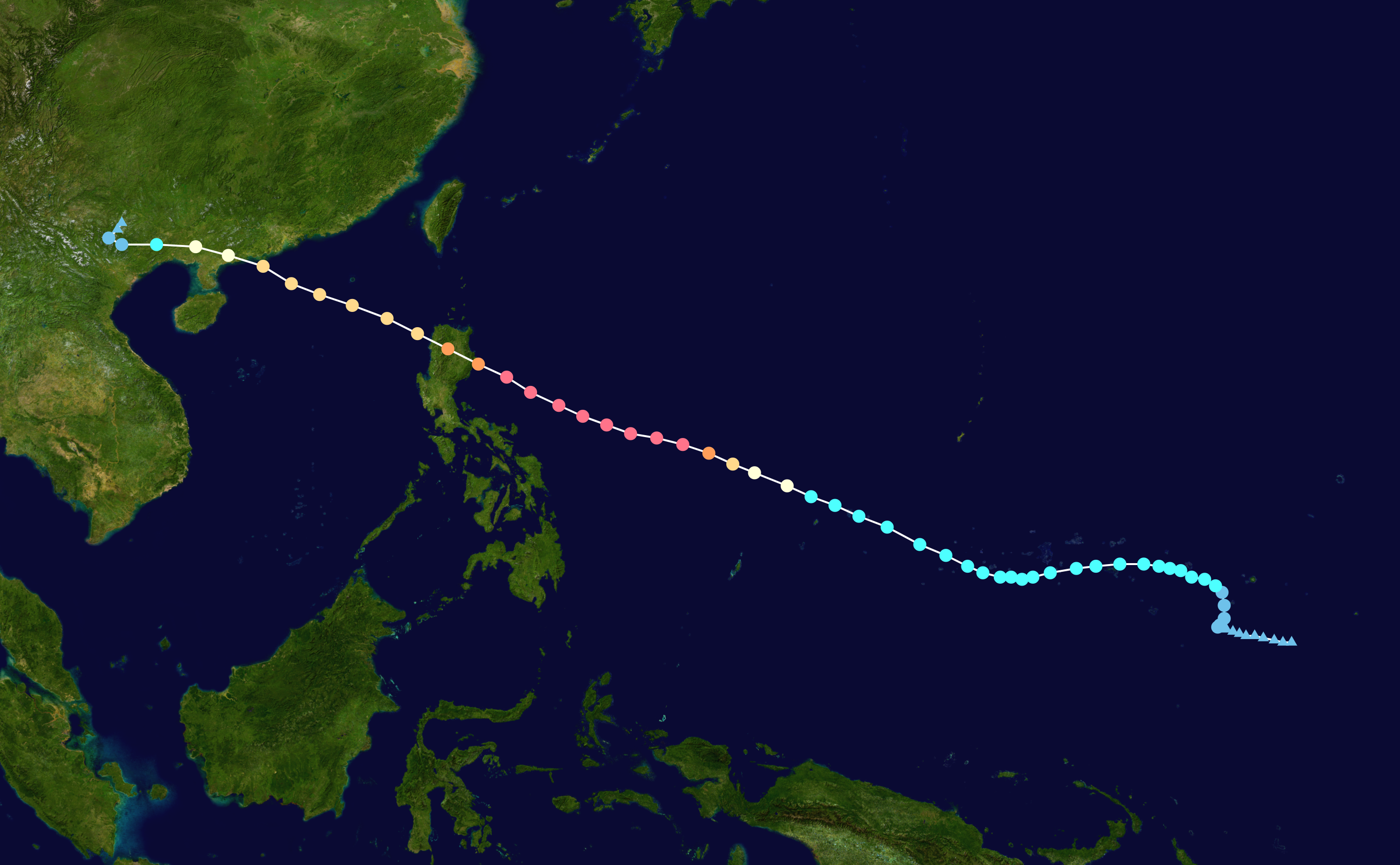
Map plotting the storm's track and intensity, according to the Saffir–Simpson scale Map key Saffir–Simpson scale Tropical depression (≤38 mph, ≤62 km/h) Tropical storm (39–73 mph, 63–118 km/h) Category 1 (74–95 mph, 119–153 km/h) Category 2 (96–110 mph, 154–177 km/h) Category 3 (111–129 mph, 178–208 km/h) Category 4 (130–156 mph, 209–251 km/h) Category 5 (≥157 mph, ≥252 km/h) Unknown Storm type Tropical cyclone Subtropical cyclone Extratropical cyclone, remnant low, tropical disturbance, or monsoon depression

An area of low pressure formed near the Caroline Islands on June 15 and moved northward and then westward where it continued to strengthen and became Tropical Storm Koryn on June 17 at 0:00 UTC. At 09:00 UTC on June 22, the JMA upgraded Koryn to a severe tropical storm. On June 23, satellite photos revealed a 10-mile (16 km) diameter eye forming in the developing storm and winds of 75 mph (121 km/h) were also detected, prompting forecasters to upgrade Koryn to typhoon status. At 12:00 UTC on the same day, the JMA upgraded Koryn to a very strong typhoon. At 18:00 UTC on the same day, the JTWC upgraded Koryn to a Category 4 typhoon.

The next day at 06:00 UTC, Koryn rapidly intensified to become the first super typhoon of the season. At 06:00 UTC, the JMA upgraded Koryn to a violent typhoon. At 12:00 UTC, the JMA estimated a minimum pressure of 905 hPa (26.7 inHg). The rapid intensification occurred within a 23-hour period. Koryn made landfall in Isabela Province as a Category 3 typhoon on June 25 at 18:00 UTC. After making landfall in the northern Philippines on June 26, Koryn entered the South China Sea as a Category 2 typhoon. The storm made landfall near Yangjiang at midnight on June 27. At 18:00 UTC on the same day, the JMA downgraded Koryn to a severe tropical storm. The JTWC issued its final warning for the system at 06:00 UTC on June 28. The storm dissipated over between Yunnan and Guangxi on June 29.

== Preparations ==
Officials at the Joint Typhoon Warning Center issued a tropical storm warning for the Caroline Islands as Tropical Depression 6W formed. In China, officials began to issue gale warnings as the typhoon was 220 miles (350 km) from making landfall. Reports of evacuations from the Philippines before the storm are unavailable.

In Hong Kong, on June 26 at 03:10 am HKT, the Royal Observatory issued a Signal No. 1. The next day, at 03:30 am HKT, the Royal Observatory raised it to a Strong Wind Signal No. 3. At 04:30 pm HKT the same day, the Royal Observatory raised it to Southeast Gale or Signal No. 8. At 10:25 pm HKT the same day, the Royal Observatory downgraded it Strong Wind Signal No. 3. At 04:15 am HKT on June 28, all signals were lowered.

== Impact ==
=== Philippines ===
In the Philippines, 28-51 people dead, injuring 853 people, 97,716 homes were damaged, 279,695 homes were partially damaged and left $102 million (₱2.7 billion) in damage, including $63 million (₱1.7 billion) in damage to infrastructure. (Note: Money values converted via Pacific Exchange Rate Service with an exchange rate for 1993) In Manila, floodwaters reached depths of up to 3 m (9.8 ft). A total of 16 provinces and six cities were placed under a state of calamity by Philippine President Fidel V. Ramos. In Pangasinan, flash floods caused at least 70% of fish ponds to overflow. Philippine Airlines canceled 16 flights. Five deaths were reported in Baguio. One person was drowned in Bantay. One person was electrocuted in La Union. In Aurora Province, 125 homes were destroyed. 275 homes were partially damaged. Major roads including Kennon Road, Marcos Highway, Quirino Road, and Maharlika Highway were closed. Damage in La Union was estimated at ₱16 million. In Laoag City, damage was estimated at ₱500,000. Damage in Cordillera Administrative Region was estimated at ₱328 million. Damage in Pangasinan amounted to ₱6 million. A 20-foot wide mudflow carrying rocks descended from Mount Pinatubo.

=== Hong Kong and China ===
In Hong Kong, 183 people were injured. In Cheung Chau, peak hourly winds of 110 km/h (68 mph) were recorded on June 27. 32 flights were canceled. Four vehicles were damaged in Ngau Tau Kok. In Macau, the storm caused extensive flooding which forced over 600 people to seek shelter. High winds also force a highway bridge to close. The 12,522-ton freighter Lian Gang sank that killed 4 people.

In China, five people were killed in Guangdong. A total of 333,000 ha (820,000 acres) of agricultural land were damaged. 32,000 homes were destroyed. More than 5.3 million people were affected. Total damage in China was estimated at $210 million (1.2 billion RMB).

=== Elsewhere ===
When Koryn passed over Ulithi, an island in the Caroline Islands, it brought 5.53 inches (140 mm) of rain and 70 mph (110 km/h) winds.

== See also ==
- Typhoon Sally (1996)
- Typhoon Imbudo
- Typhoon Usagi (2013)
- Typhoon Hagupit (2008)
