= Tropical Storm Arlene (1993) =

Atlantic tropical storm in 1993

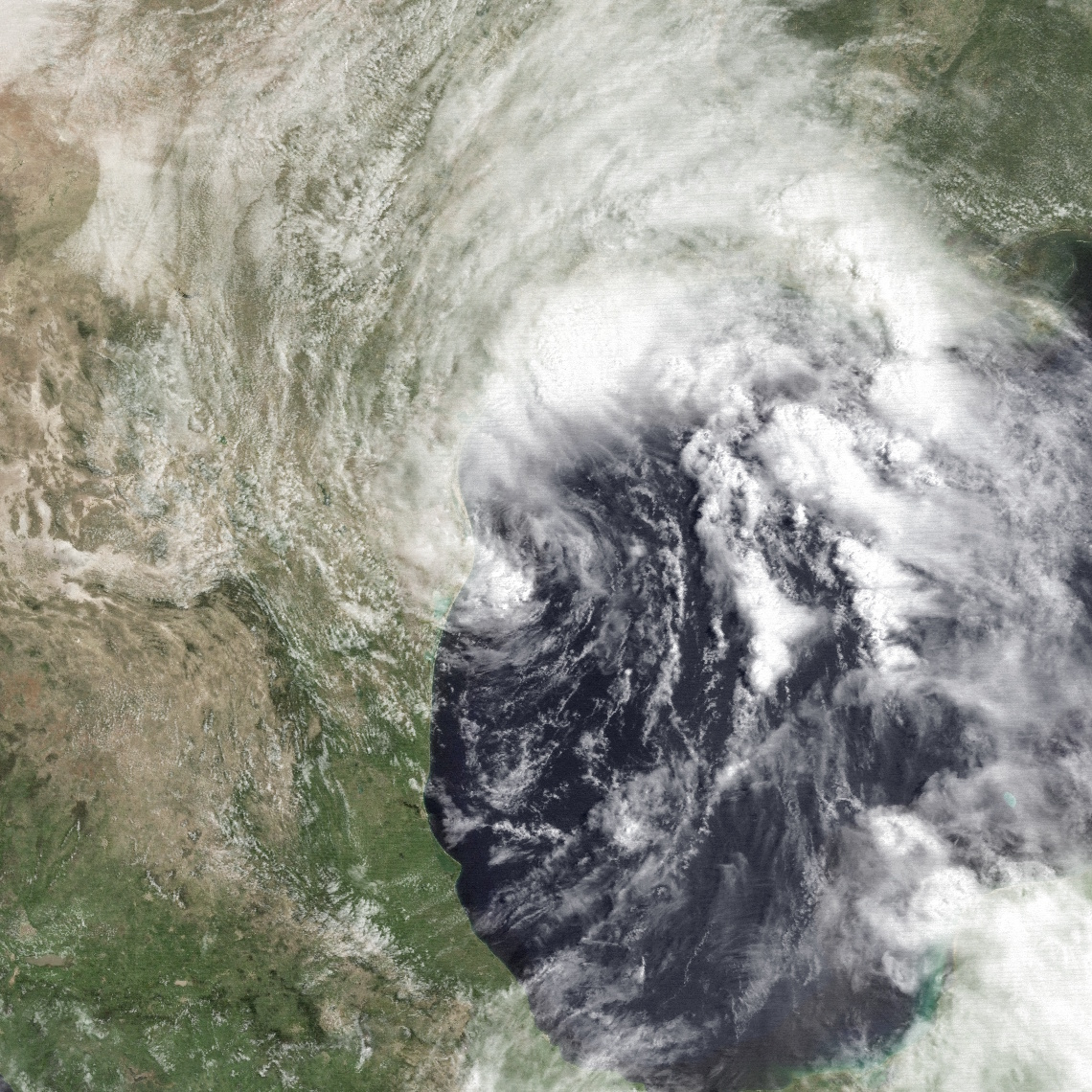
- Arlene near its Texas landfall on June 19

Meteorological history
- Formed: June 18, 1993
- Dissipated: June 21, 1993

Tropical storm
- 1-minute sustained (SSHWS/NWS)
- Highest winds: 40 mph (65 km/h)
- Lowest pressure: 1000 mbar (hPa); 29.53 inHg

Overall effects
- Fatalities: 26 direct
- Damage: ≥$60.8 million (1993 USD)
- Areas affected: El Salvador, Yucatán Peninsula, Texas, Louisiana, Arkansas
- IBTrACS
- Part of the 1993 Atlantic hurricane season

Tropical Storm Arlene brought torrential rainfall to the western United States Gulf Coast, particularly to the U.S. state of Texas, in June 1993. The first named storm of the 1993 Atlantic hurricane season, Arlene developed from an area of low pressure in the Bay of Campeche on June 18. The depression slowly strengthened as it tracked west-northwestward and later north-northwestward across the western Gulf of Mexico. Arlene was subsequently upgraded to a tropical storm on June 19, but failed to intensify further due to its proximity to land. The cyclone then made landfall on Padre Island, Texas, with winds of 40 mph (65 km/h) and degenerated into a remnant disturbance on June 21.

The precursor disturbance to Tropical Storm Arlene dropped heavy rainfall over Central America. As a result, 20 fatalities occurred, all of which were from a mudslide in El Salvador. Heavy rainfall also produced heavy rainfall on the Yucatán Peninsula. After Arlene became a tropical cyclone, rainfall in Mexico inundated areas of Campeche, where damage totaled US$33 million. (Note: All monetary values are in 1993 United States dollars.) In total, five people were killed in Mexico. Flood damage in South Texas was extensive, with widespread urban flooding and road closures. Entire plots of farmland were inundated by torrential rains brought by Arlene. The landfalling Arlene interacted with a passing cold front which helped to produce showers further northeast, though damage in those locales was comparatively less severe. In total, Arlene caused 26 deaths and at least US$60.8 million in damage.

== Meteorological history ==
Map plotting the storm's track and intensity, according to the Saffir–Simpson scale Map key Saffir–Simpson scale Tropical depression (≤38 mph, ≤62 km/h) Tropical storm (39–73 mph, 63–118 km/h) Category 1 (74–95 mph, 119–153 km/h) Category 2 (96–110 mph, 154–177 km/h) Category 3 (111–129 mph, 178–208 km/h) Category 4 (130–156 mph, 209–251 km/h) Category 5 (≥157 mph, ≥252 km/h) Unknown Storm type Tropical cyclone Subtropical cyclone Extratropical cyclone, remnant low, tropical disturbance, or monsoon depression

The precursor to Arlene was first identified in satellite images as a cluster of disturbed weather east of the Mosquito Coast on June 9. Over the following week, the system grew in expanse as it slowly tracked northwestward as strong wind shear in the area prohibited the development of a tropical cyclone. On June 16, the formation of an upper-level low over the Bay of Campeche and the progression of a tropical wave across the Caribbean Sea helped foster the development of a low-pressure area over the Yucatán Peninsula. Although initially diffuse, new rainbands began to wrap around the new vortex's center, and at 0000 UTC, the National Hurricane Center (NHC) classified the system as a tropical depression west of the Yucatán Peninsula. Although the storm was now considered a tropical cyclone, wind shear that had earlier inhibited development remained present, as well as the outflow of Tropical Storm Beatriz in the Eastern Pacific, disrupting the core of the infant tropical depression; aircraft reconnaissance often could not identify a defined center of circulation.

While the initial system in the Bay of Campeche continued to struggle in its organization, a new cluster of thunderstorms concentrated in a band developed to the depression's northwest late on June 18. Over the next 24 hours, this new area of precipitation began to wrap cyclonically around a new and dominant circulation center; the NHC assumed the tropical depression to have relocated to the northwest and classified the system as Tropical Storm Arlene at 1200 UTC on June 19. As Arlene would not strengthen after classification, peak intensity was attained concurrent with its upgrade to tropical storm strength with maximum sustained winds of 40 mph (65 km/h) and a minimum barometric pressure of 1000 mbar (hPa; 29.71 inHg). Meandering off the coast of South Texas due to the presence of a shortwave trough to its north, Arlene eventually made landfall at 0900 UTC on June 20 at a virtually unchanged intensity at point on Padre Island roughly 45 mi (70 km) south of Corpus Christi, Texas. The tropical storm quickly deteriorated to tropical depression intensity after landfall, and was no longer considered a tropical cyclone after 0600 UTC on June 21. The remnants of Arlene continued to track across the Rio Grande Valley before they faded into the ambient environment.

== Preparations and impact ==
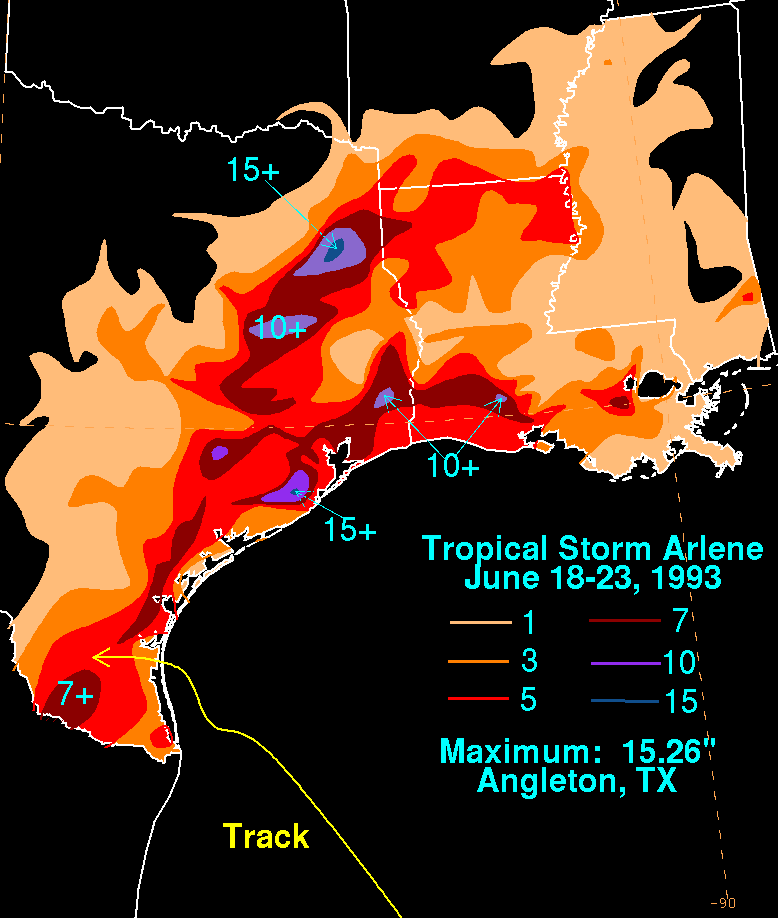
Rainfall totals from Arlene in the United States

=== Central America and the Gulf of Mexico ===
The precursor to Arlene caused torrential and prolonged rainfall across Central America. In El Salvador, a single landslide attributed to the flooding killed 20 people. Flooding in Mexico associated with the tropical system killed four in the state of Yucatán and one in Campeche, where flood damage was estimated at US$33 million. As many as 4,000 homes were flooded, impacting roughly 10,000 people and prompting Mexican armed forces to implement emergency rescue plans in the state. The highest rainfall total in Mexico was documented in Mérida, Yucatán, where a station measured 13.26 in (336 mm) of rain. As a tropical cyclone, however, Arlene's highest rainfall total occurred in the Camargo Municipality of Tamaulipas, where 7.32 in (186 mm) of rain was reported. In Matamoros, roads were blocked by mud and rocks.

Arlene passed over several offshore oil platforms as it tracked northwestward across the Gulf of Mexico, producing gusty winds. The strongest surface wind gust reported in association with Arlene was clocked at 63 mph (101 km/h) on an oil platform south of Sabine Pass, Texas. Four other oil platforms experienced gusts or sustained winds of at least gale force.

=== Texas ===
Due to the unanticipated relocation of Arlene, only one tropical cyclone watch or warning—a tropical storm warning for coastal areas from Brownsville to Matagorda on June 19—was ever issued by the NHC in association with the cyclone. Issued 21 hours before landfall, the warning was discontinued after the system moved inland. Prior to the warning, Arlene had satisfied the criterion for a tropical storm watch as a developing tropical depression. However, the NHC and various National Weather Service forecast offices opted to delay the watch as a result of the poorly organized appearance of the cyclone at the time. Given the weak nature of Arlene and the relatively unpopulated extent of coast which it impacted, evacuations were minimal – only fifteen fled from summer homes along Magnolia Beach and Indianola, Texas due to the threat of flooding.

On the Texas coast, Arlene produced a small storm surge peaking at 4 ft (1.2 m) in some areas, breaching sections of Padre Island and causing flooding. The storm tide also eroded up to a foot (0.3 m) of sand from beaches in the lower Texas coast. Combined with the heavy rainfall associated with Arlene, the storm surge produced significant tidal flooding in some coastal stretches. Beach erosion occurred as far north as Galveston Bay, where tides were reported to be as high as 5 ft (1.5 m). A woman was swept into the sea off a jetty near Freeport and required rescue by United States Coast Guard. Over the waters of Lake Corpus Christi, a large funnel cloud was reported but never touched down or caused any damage. Nearby, the John F. Kennedy Memorial Causeway was completely inundated with the exception of one lane, prompting an extensive study of possible solutions to raising the causeway nearly two years later.

Precipitation from the tropical storm reached areas 170 mi (275 km) inland, and was enhanced in northeastern Texas, Louisiana, and Arkansas as a result of interaction between the cyclone and a passing frontal boundary. Arlene exacerbated preexisting flood conditions in some areas of South Texas. Rainfall peaked at 15.26 in (388 mm) in Angleton, Texas, and other localized rainfall maxima of at least 10 in (250 mm) were observed in Texas. The torrential precipitation caused rivers to swell and overflow their banks, forcing farm-to-market roads to close and inundating plots of crops. Portions of Interstate 10 were forced to close after flood waters overran the highway. The entirety of the watermelon crop in Waller County was eliminated by the floods. In Kingwood, Texas, some homes were flooded. One storm-related death occurred in Henderson, where rain was measured at 14.82 in (326 mm).

The deep moisture from Arlene caused extensive crop damage, with 20% losses to the cantaloupe crop, 10% for the watermelon crop, and 18% of the tomato crop, resulting in US$3–5 million in damage in East Texas. In the Brownsville area, standing floodwaters ruined the near harvest-ready sorghum crop and killed blossoming cotton plants. Street flooding was prevalent in urban areas. At one point during the storm downtown Raymondville was completely underwater. The U.S. Coast Guard deployed small boats to the city to encourage the evacuation of about 250 homes. Urban flooding also occurred in the Corpus Christi area, in addition to an increase of weeds and insects. A station in the city set a daily record for rainfall with 2.57 in (65 mm) of rain over a seven-and-a-half-hour period. Roughly 50,000 ac (20,000 ha) of sorghum, 11,000 ac (4,000 ha) of cotton, and 8 ac (3 ha) of pima cotton were inundated in Refugio County. Damage to crops in San Patricio County totaled US$2.8 million. The destruction wrought to homes, businesses, and infrastructure across Texas reached US$22 million.

=== Louisiana ===
In Louisiana, rainfall peaked at 12.96 in (329 mm) in Shreveport Regional Airport. Nearby, Cross Lake rose to its third highest level in recorded history, flooding 180 nearby homes and necessitating the rescue of 30–40 people. Six parishes sustained flood damage to some extent, mainly resulting from bayou overflows.

== See also ==
- Other storms with the same name
- Tropical Storm Beryl (2000)
- Hurricane Barry (1983)
- Hurricane Erika (2003)
