= 1993 Pacific typhoon season =

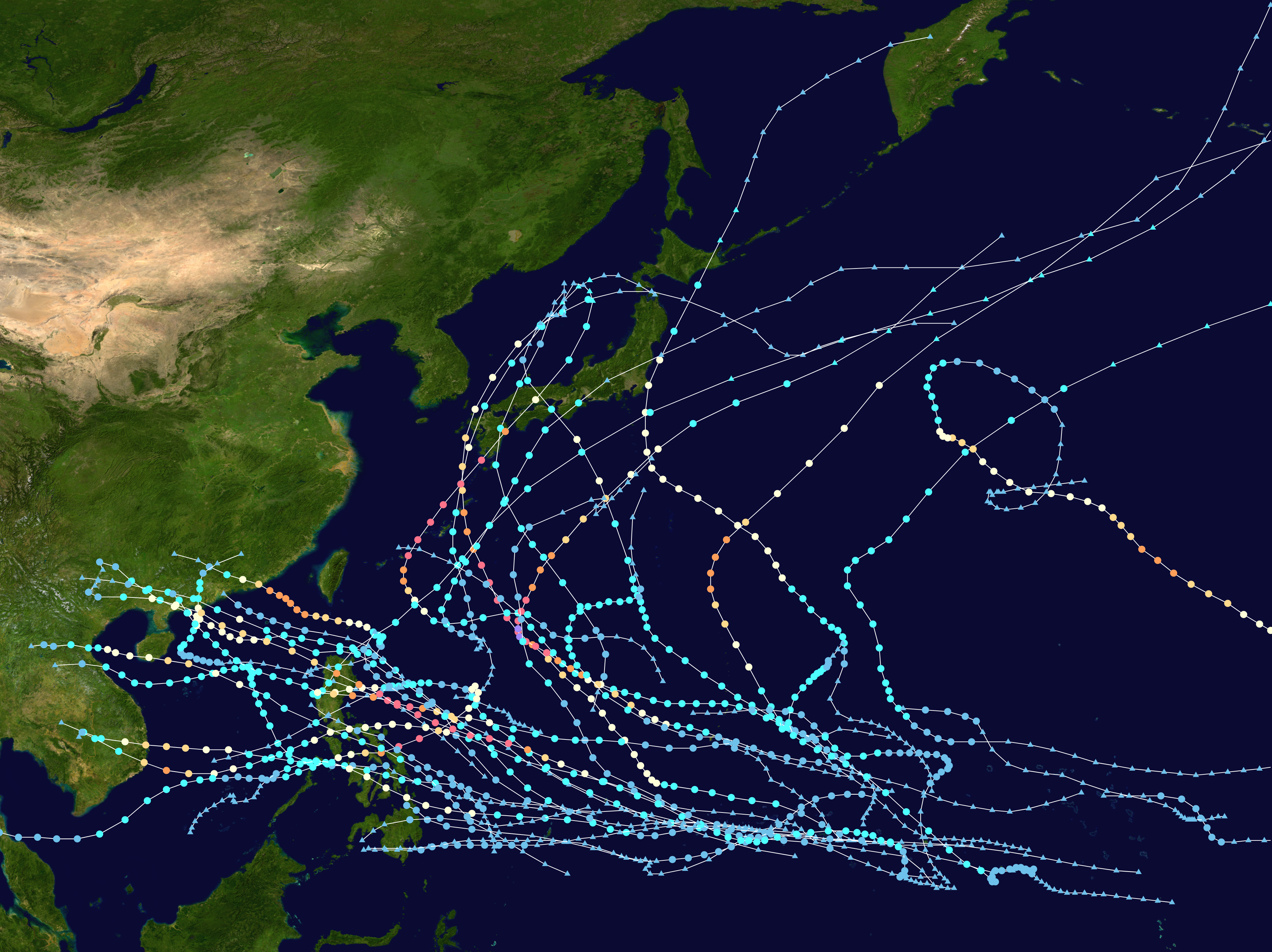
- Season summary map

Seasonal boundaries
- First system formed: February 28, 1993
- Last system dissipated: January 1, 1994

Strongest storm
- Name: Koryn
  - Maximum winds: 195 km/h (120 mph) (10-minute sustained)
  - Lowest pressure: 905 hPa (mbar)

Seasonal statistics
- Total depressions: 50
- Total storms: 28
- Typhoons: 15
- Very strong typhoons: 6
- Violent typhoons: 1
- ACE: 267.1 units
- Total fatalities: 1,743 total
- Total damage: $3.79 billion (1993 USD)

Related articles
- 1993 Atlantic hurricane season; 1993 Pacific hurricane season; 1993 North Indian Ocean cyclone season

The 1993 Pacific typhoon season was the most active season for the Philippines, seeing a total of 32 storms forming or entering their area of responsibility. Overall, it was an above average season, spawning 28 tropical storms, 15 typhoons and three super typhoons. The season had no official bounds; it ran year-round in 1993, but most tropical cyclones tend to form in the northwestern Pacific Ocean between May and December. These dates conventionally delimit the period of each year when most tropical cyclones form in the northwestern Pacific Ocean.

Tropical Storms formed in the entire west pacific basin were assigned a name by the Joint Typhoon Warning Center. Tropical depressions in this basin have the "W" suffix added to their number. Tropical depressions that enter or form in the Philippine area of responsibility are assigned a name by the Philippine Atmospheric, Geophysical and Astronomical Services Administration or PAGASA. This can often result in the same storm having two names.

== Systems ==
40 tropical cyclones formed this year in the Western Pacific, of which 30 became tropical storms. 15 storms reached typhoon intensity, of which 3 reached super typhoon strength.

=== Tropical Depression 01W (Atring) ===
- Tropical depression (JMA)
- Tropical depression (SSHWS)
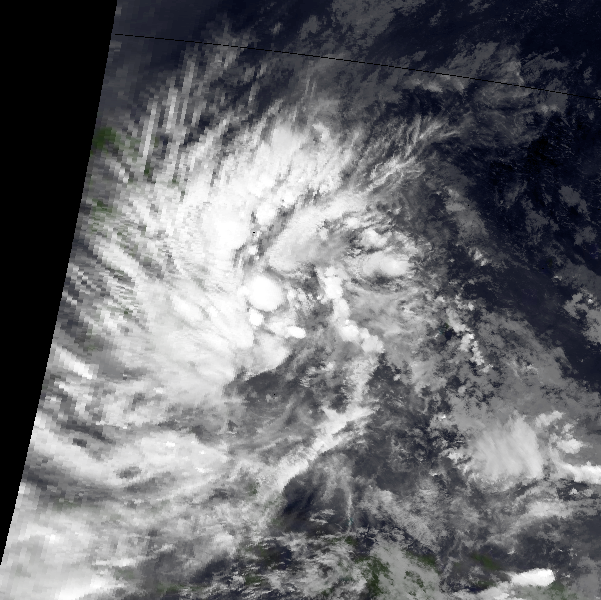
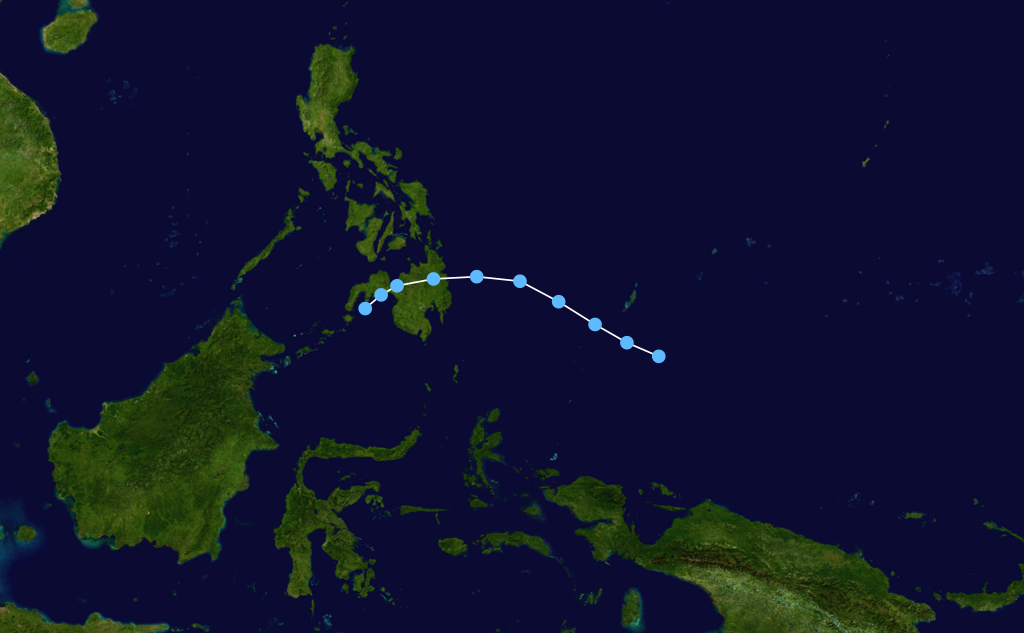
- Duration: February 28 – March 1
- Peak intensity: 55 km/h (35 mph) (10-min); 1010 hPa (mbar)

Tropical Depression 01W formed on February 27, 1993, near the Philippines. The storm made landfall on Mindanao on March 1, before it dissipated the next day.

=== Severe Tropical Storm Irma ===
- Severe tropical storm (JMA)
- Tropical storm (SSHWS)
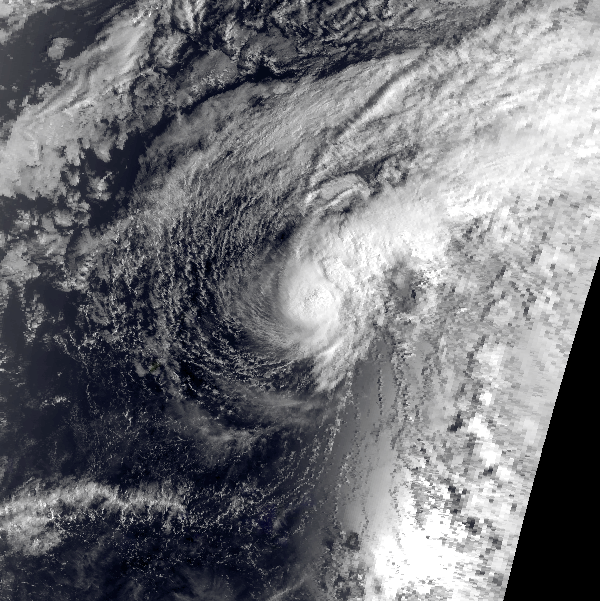
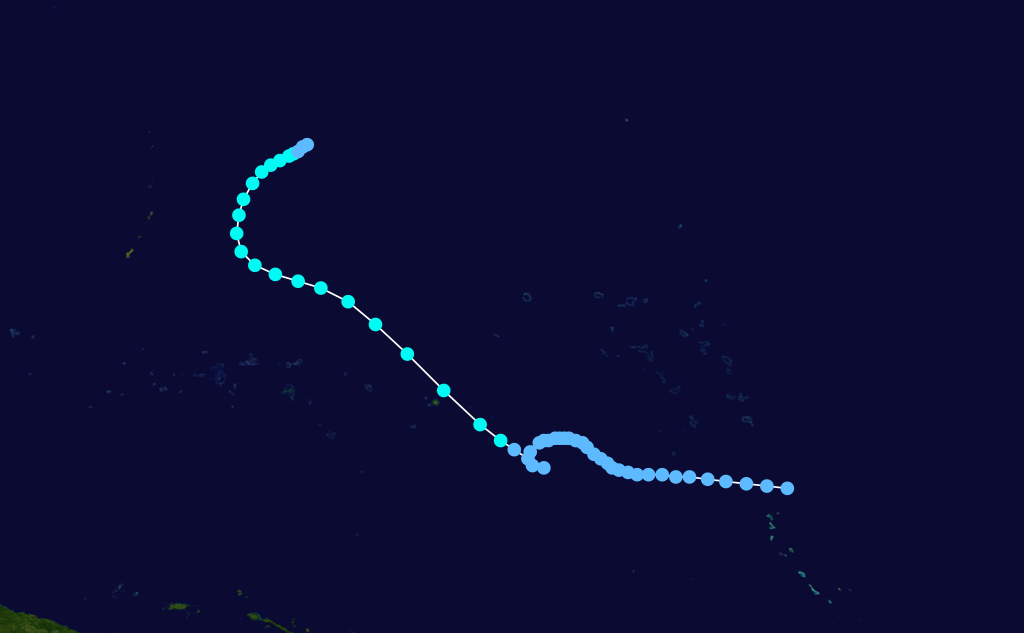
- Duration: March 8 – March 17
- Peak intensity: 95 km/h (60 mph) (10-min); 985 hPa (mbar)

Irma shied away from land masses.

=== Tropical Depression 03W (Bining) ===
- Tropical depression (PAGASA)
- Tropical depression (SSHWS)
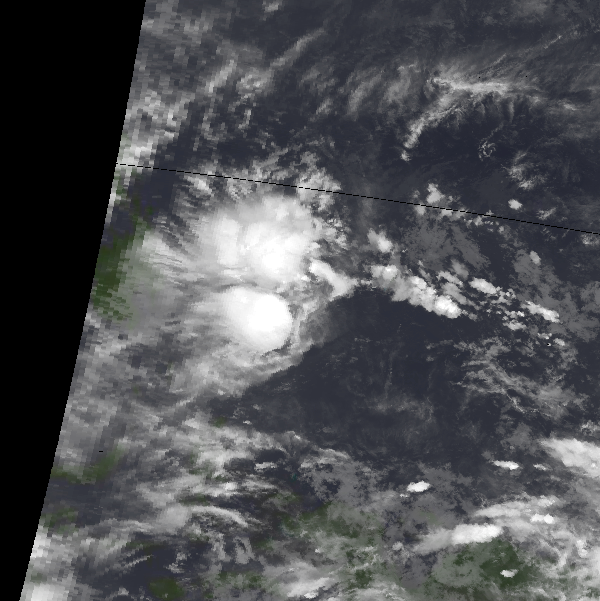
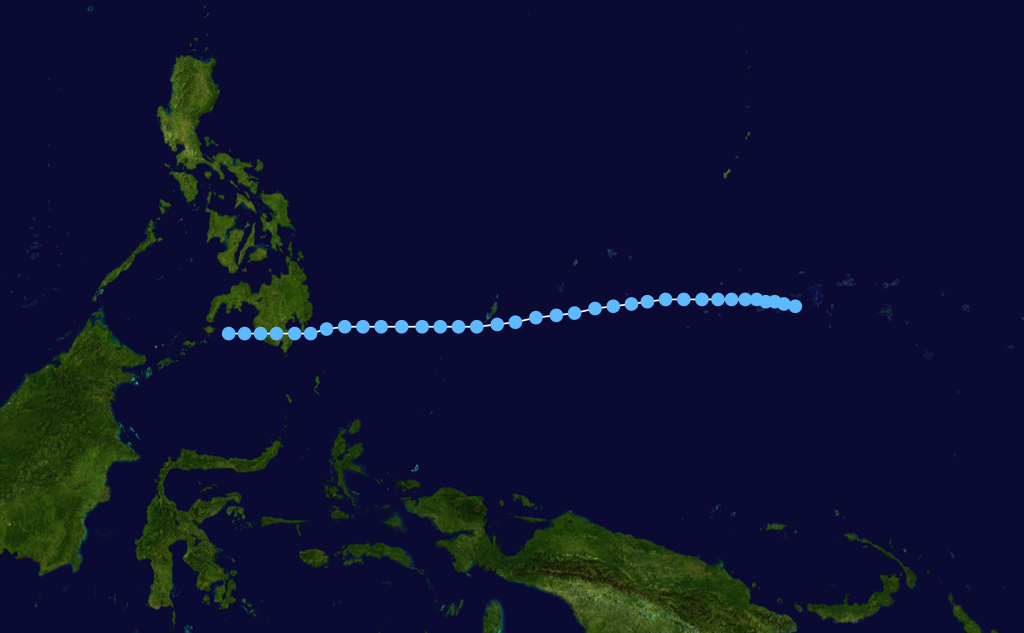
- Duration: April 9 – April 13
- Peak intensity: 55 km/h (35 mph) (10-min); 1002 hPa (mbar)

It formed on April 9 east of Mindanao. It made landfall on Mindanao on April 13 and dissipated later that day.

=== Tropical Depression 04W (Kuring) ===
- Tropical depression (PAGASA)
- Tropical depression (SSHWS)
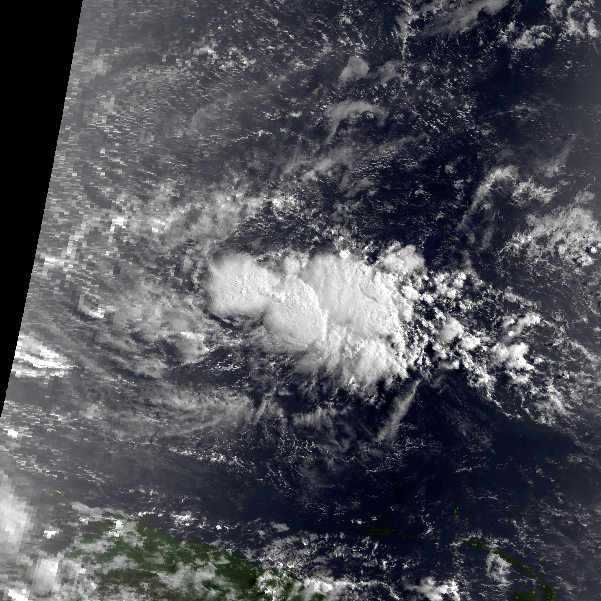
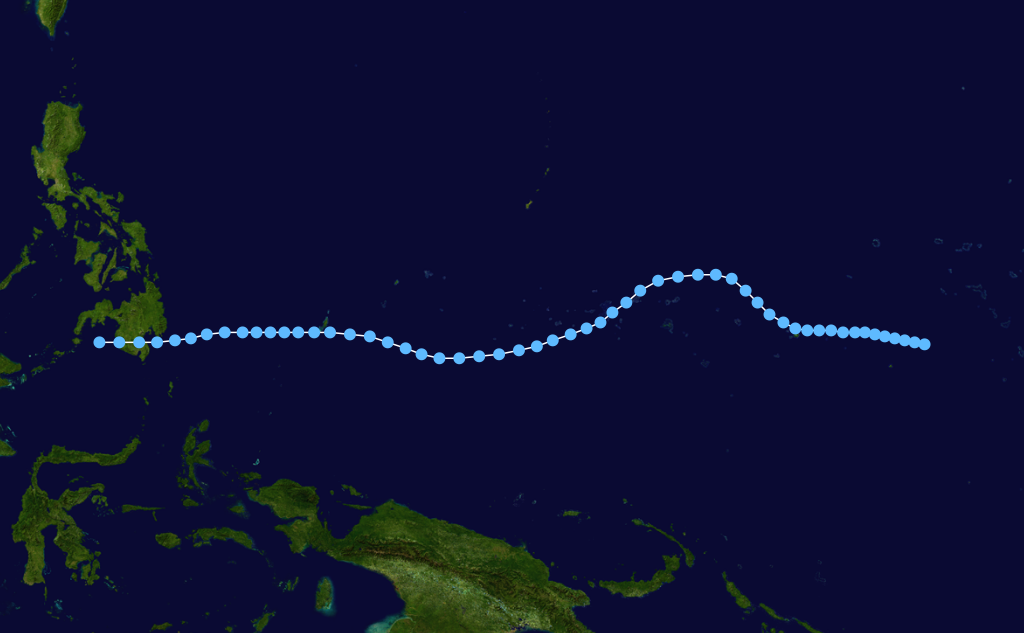
- Duration: April 15 – April 27
- Peak intensity: 45 km/h (30 mph) (10-min); 1005 hPa (mbar)

It formed on April 15, 1993. Curving twice, it made landfall on Mindanao. It is the third storm to make landfall in Mindanao this season.

=== Tropical Depression Daling ===
- Tropical depression (PAGASA)
- Duration: May 2 – May 4
- Peak intensity: 45 km/h (30 mph) (10-min); 1006 hPa (mbar)

The PAGASA classified the depression as 'Daling' on May 3 as it made landfall over southern Mindanao the next day. It dissipated in the Sulu Sea on May 4.

=== Tropical Depression Jack ===
- Tropical depression (JMA)
- Tropical storm (SSHWS)
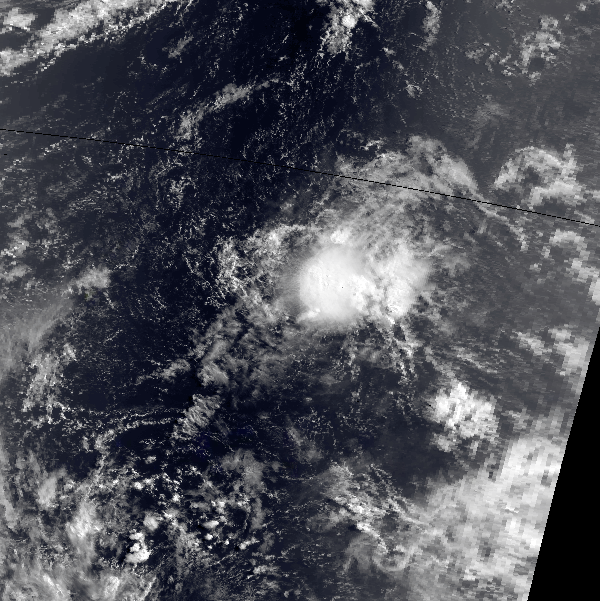
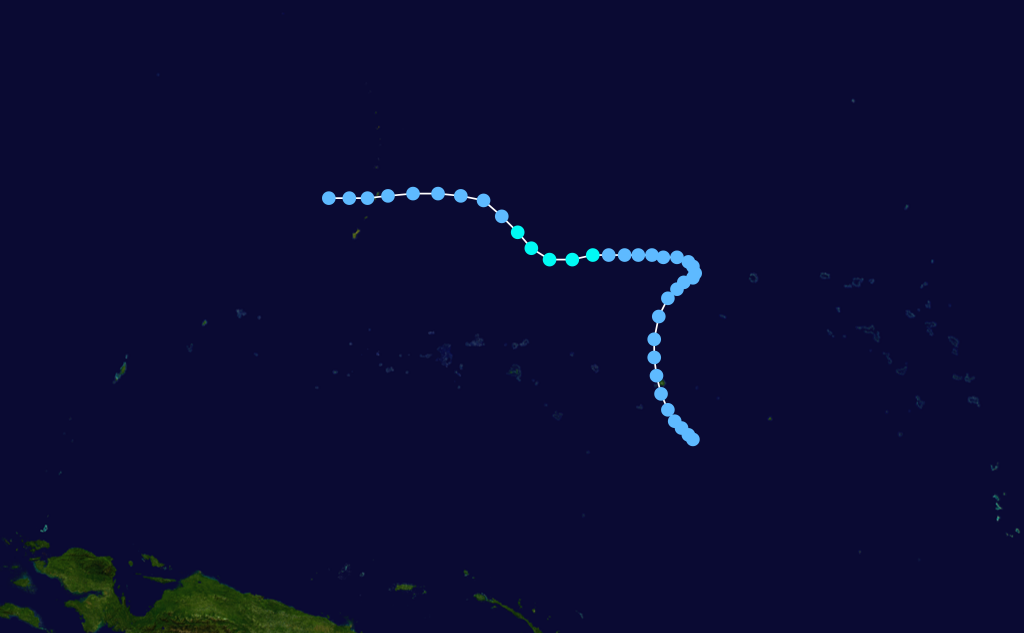
- Duration: May 16 – May 22
- Peak intensity: 65 km/h (40 mph) (1-min); 1008 hPa (mbar)

Jack stayed at sea.

=== Super Typhoon Koryn (Goring) ===
- Violent typhoon (JMA)
- Category 4 super typhoon (SSHWS)
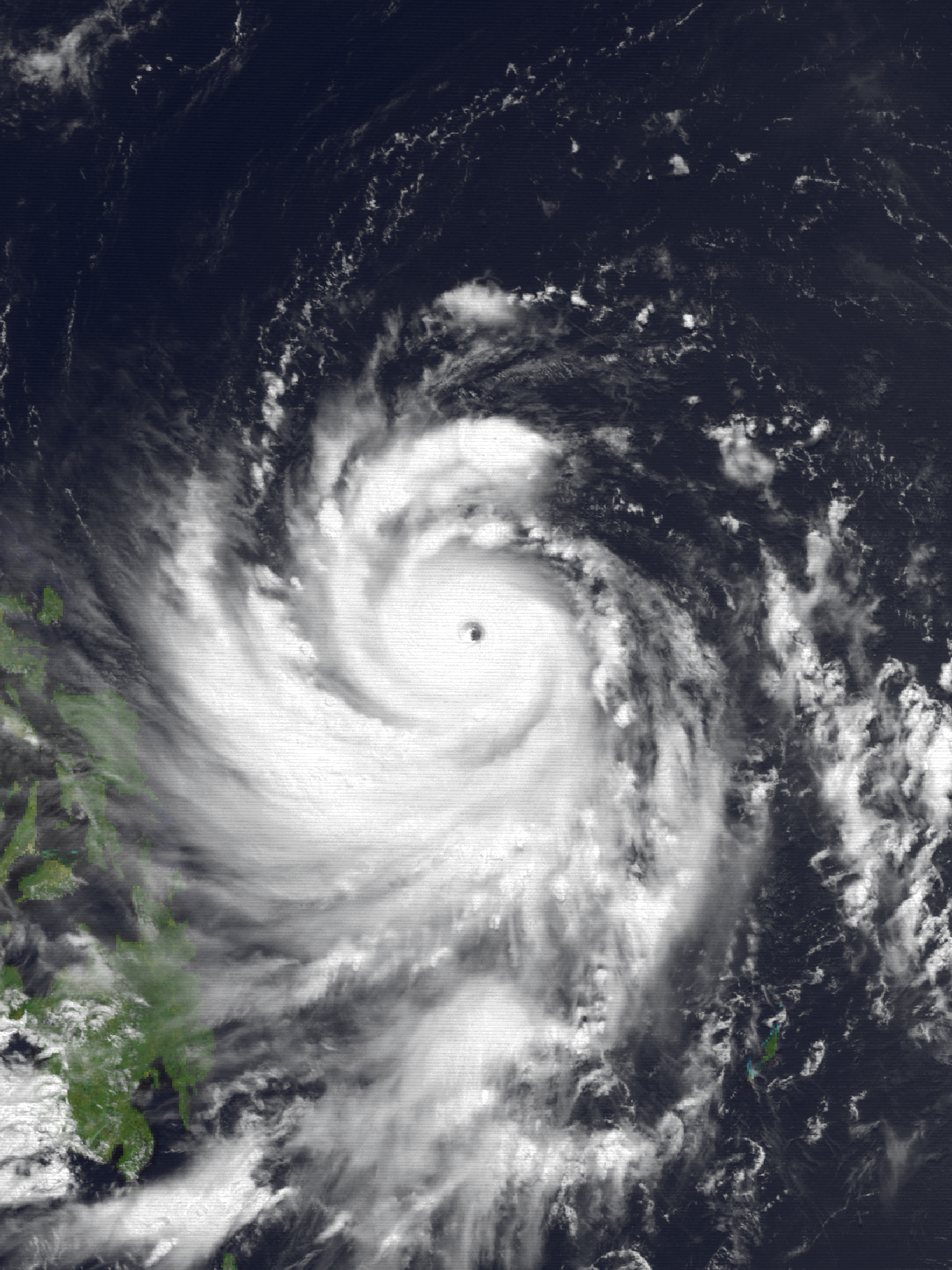
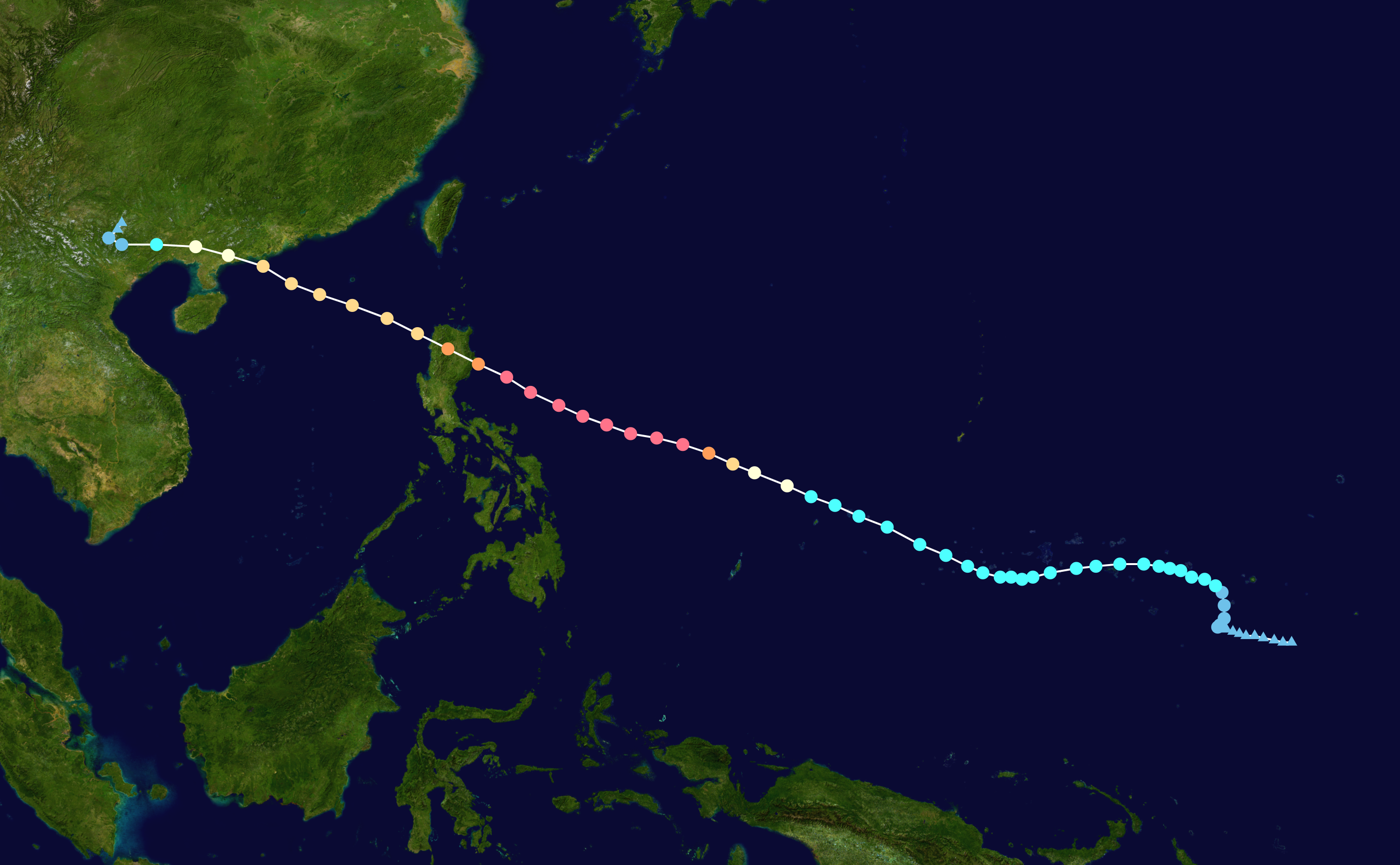
- Duration: June 15 – June 29
- Peak intensity: 195 km/h (120 mph) (10-min); 905 hPa (mbar)

Typhoon Koryn, having developed well east of the Philippines on June 13, steadily strengthened as it moved westward, intensifying to a peak of 150 mph (240 km/h) winds on the 24th. It crossed northern Luzon the next day as a slightly weaker 130 mph (210 km/h) typhoon, and continued west-northwestward until hitting southern China (90 nautical miles southwest of Hong Kong on the 27th). Koryn slowly wound down, bringing heavy rain through China and northern Vietnam before dissipating on the 29th. Koryn was responsible for the loss of 37 people, as well as $14.5 million (1993 USD) in damage over the northern Philippines.

=== Tropical Depression 07W (Elang) ===
- Tropical depression (PAGASA)
- Tropical depression (SSHWS)
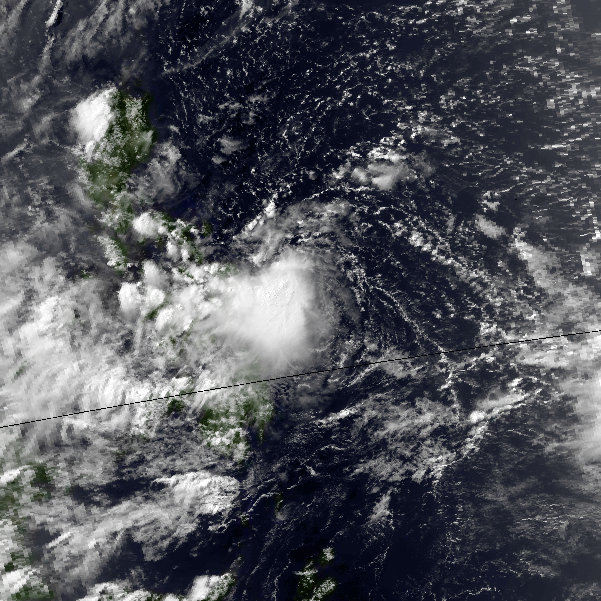
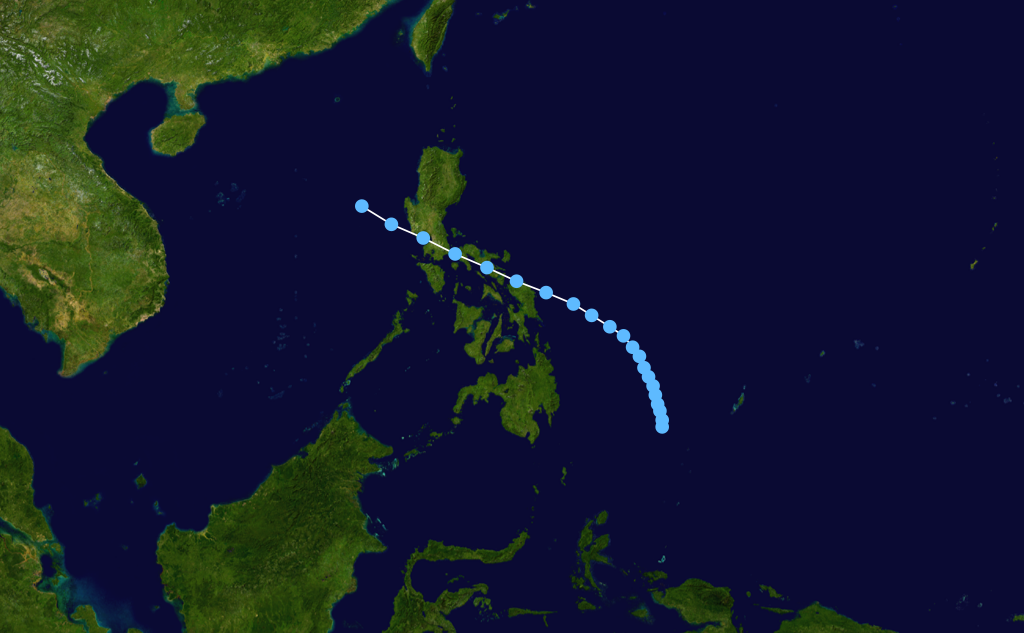
- Duration: June 17 – June 20
- Peak intensity: 55 km/h (35 mph) (10-min); 1004 hPa (mbar)

Elang made landfall in the Philippines.

=== Severe Tropical Storm Lewis (Huling) ===
- Severe tropical storm (JMA)
- Category 2 typhoon (SSHWS)
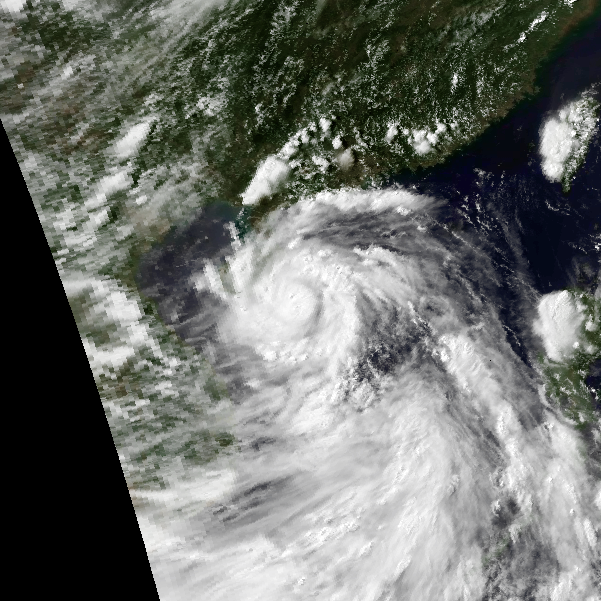
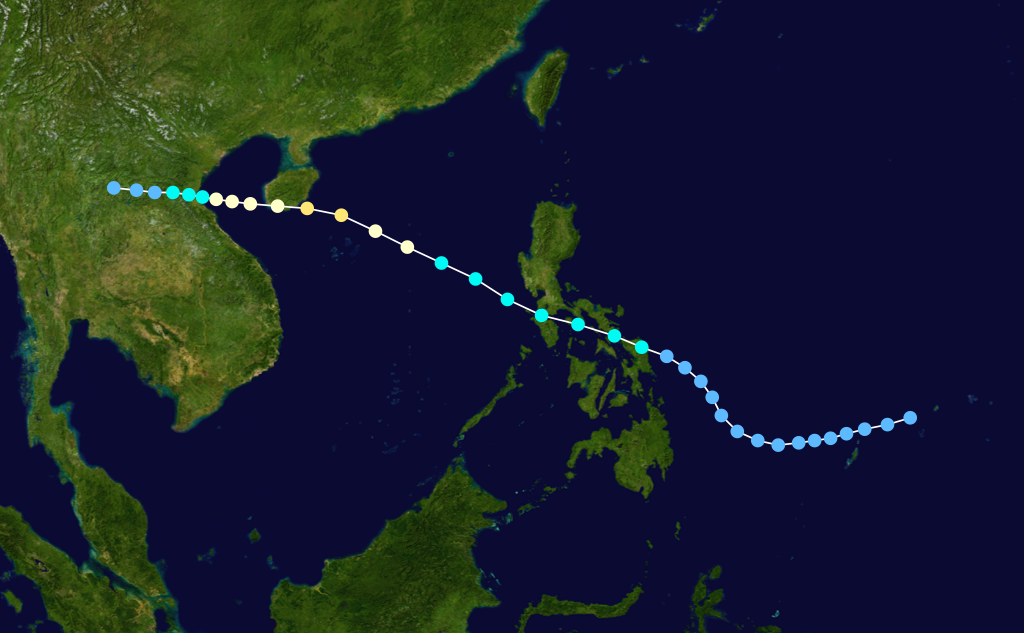
- Duration: July 6 – July 13
- Peak intensity: 110 km/h (70 mph) (10-min); 975 hPa (mbar)

Lewis was one of many systems to hit the Philippines that year. 19 people were killed.

=== Tropical Storm Marian (Ibiang) ===
- Tropical depression (JMA)
- Tropical storm (SSHWS)
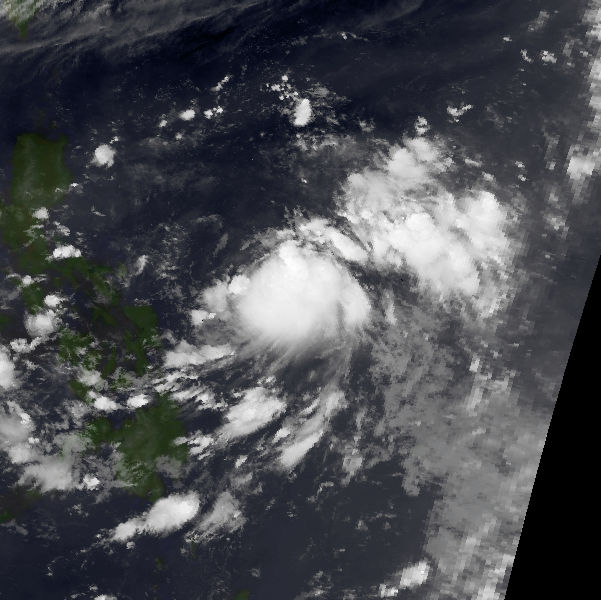
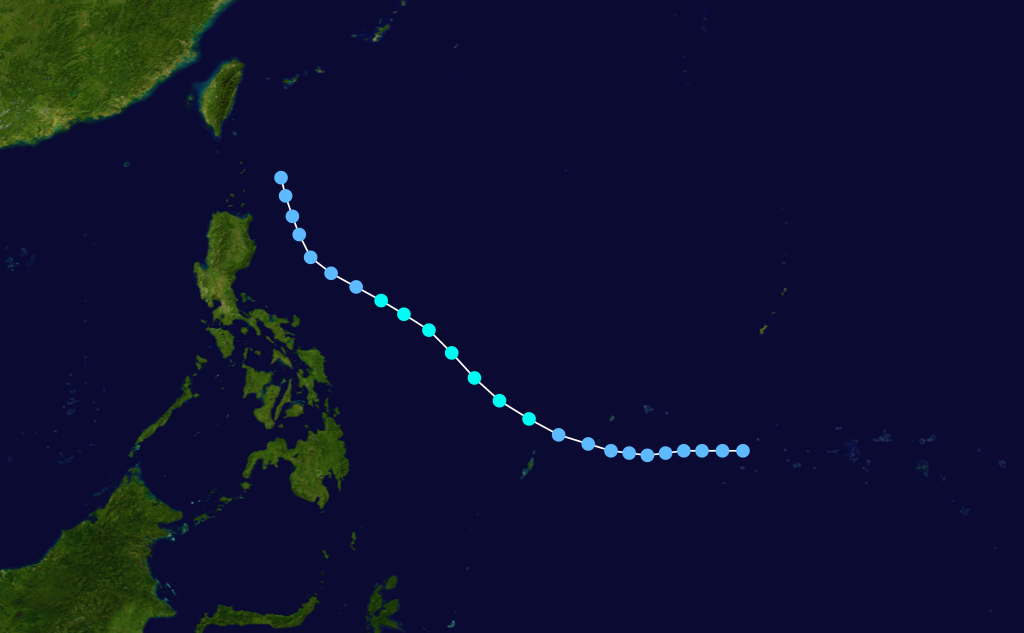
- Duration: July 13 – July 17
- Peak intensity: 55 km/h (35 mph) (10-min); 1000 hPa (mbar)

Marian stayed within the Philippine Sea.

=== Severe Tropical Storm Nathan ===
- Severe tropical storm (JMA)
- Category 1 typhoon (SSHWS)
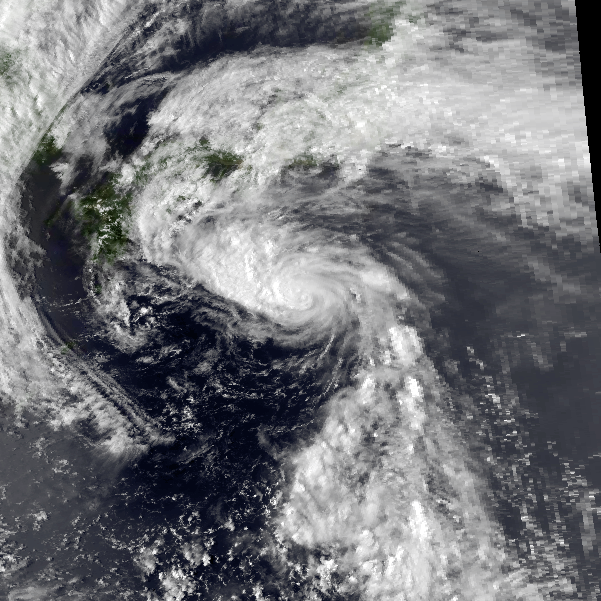
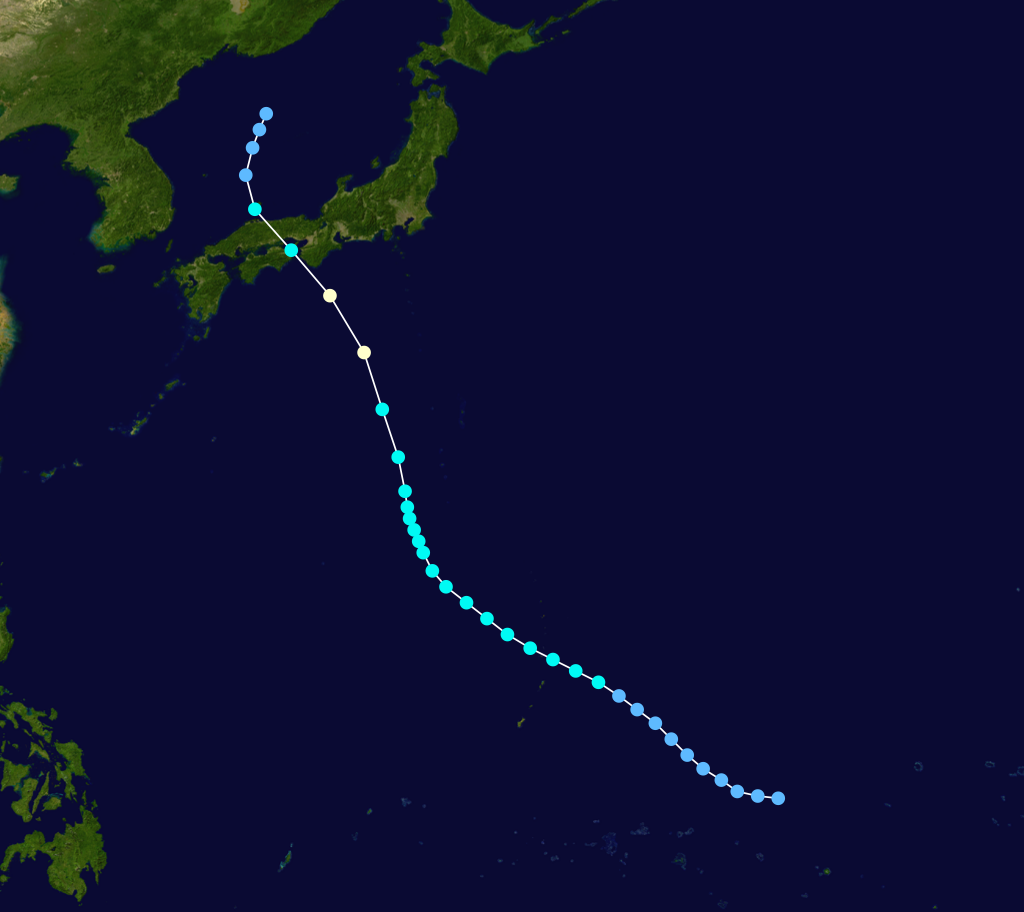
- Duration: July 19 – July 25
- Peak intensity: 100 km/h (65 mph) (10-min); 980 hPa (mbar)

Nathan crossed Japan. Losses in Yamanashi prefecture were ¥2.168 billion (US$19.5 million). 47 were killed in Kochi Prefecture.

=== Tropical Storm Ofelia (Luming) ===
- Tropical storm (JMA)
- Tropical storm (SSHWS)
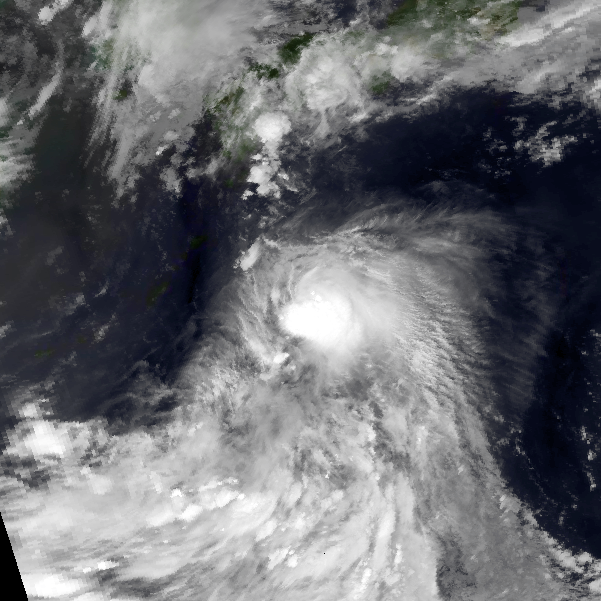
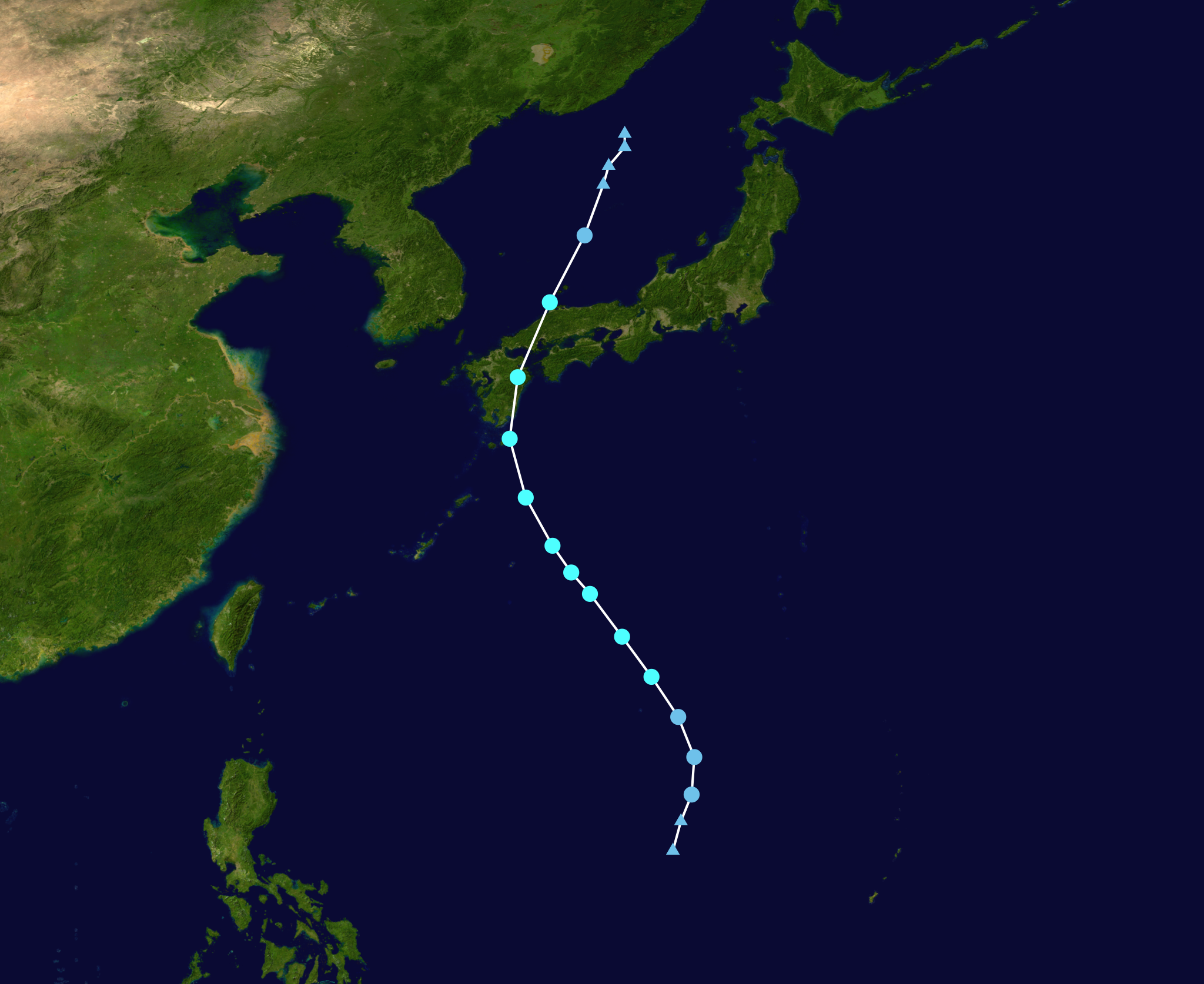
- Duration: July 24 – July 27
- Peak intensity: 85 km/h (50 mph) (10-min); 990 hPa (mbar)

Ofelia moved over Japan.

=== Severe Tropical Storm Percy (Miling) ===
- Severe tropical storm (JMA)
- Category 1 typhoon (SSHWS)
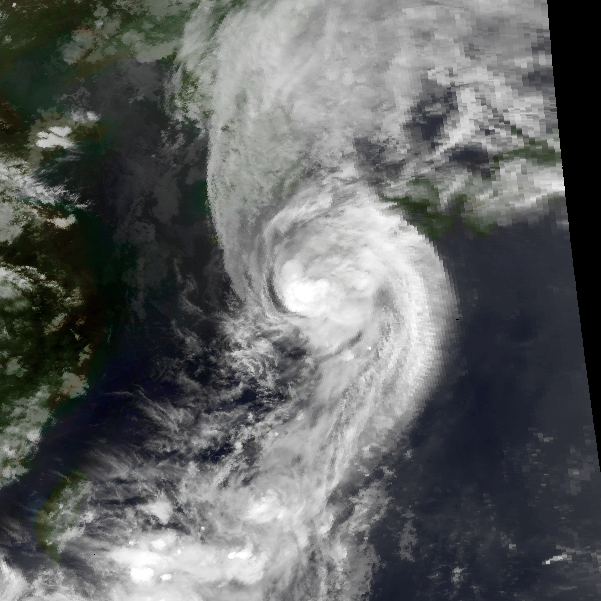
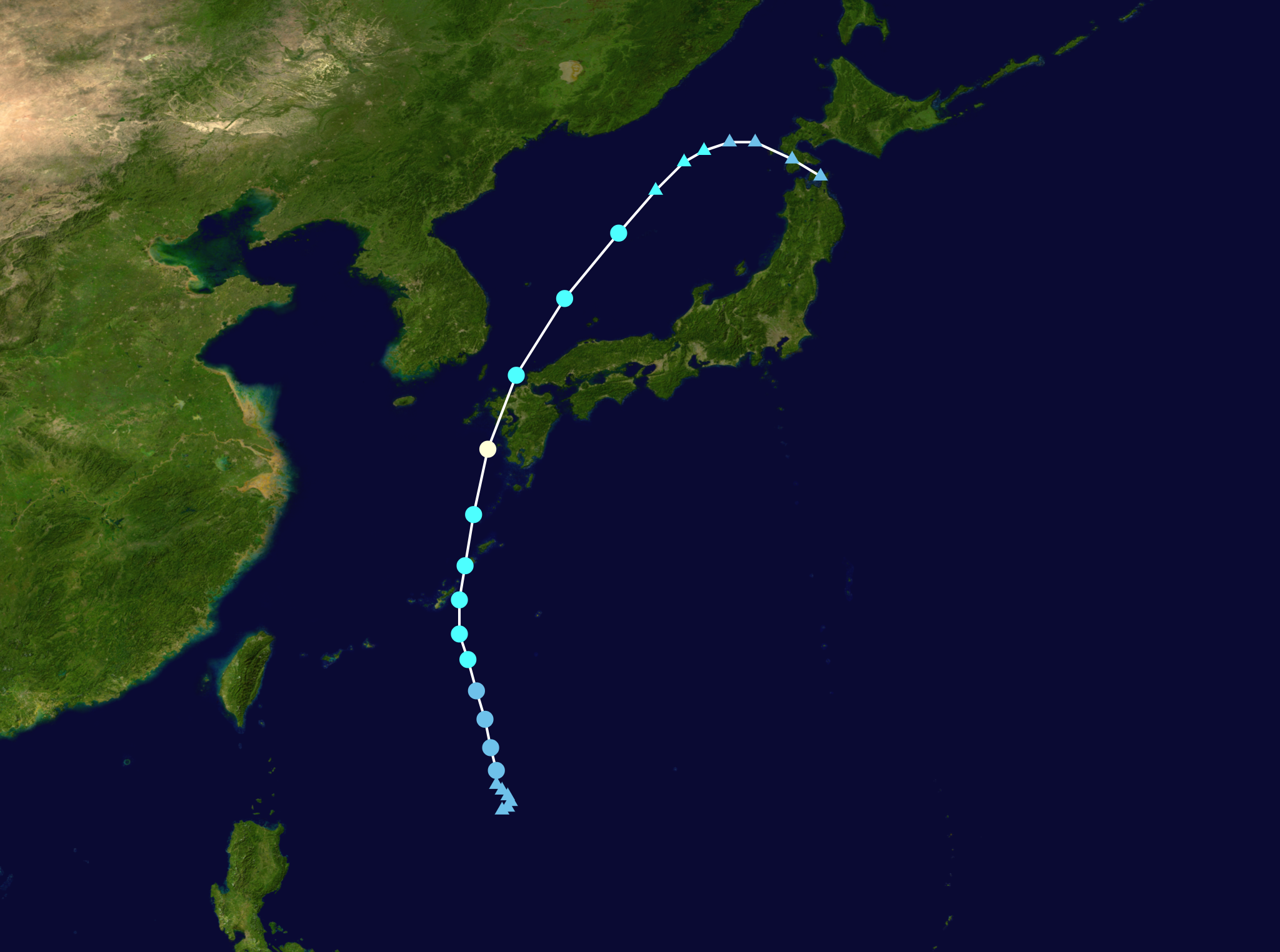
- Duration: July 26 – July 30
- Peak intensity: 110 km/h (70 mph) (10-min); 975 hPa (mbar)

Percy also struck Japan.

=== Tropical Depression Narsing ===
- Tropical depression (PAGASA)
- Duration: July 29 – July 30
- Peak intensity: 55 km/h (35 mph) (10-min);

On July 29, PAGASA initiated advisories on a poorly organised tropical depression. The depression moved slowly towards the north-west before it dissipated during the next day.

=== Typhoon Robyn (Openg) ===
- Very strong typhoon (JMA)
- Category 4 typhoon (SSHWS)
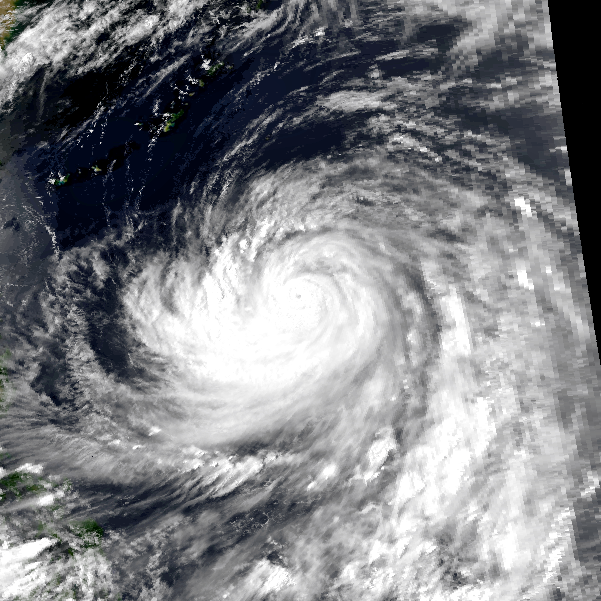
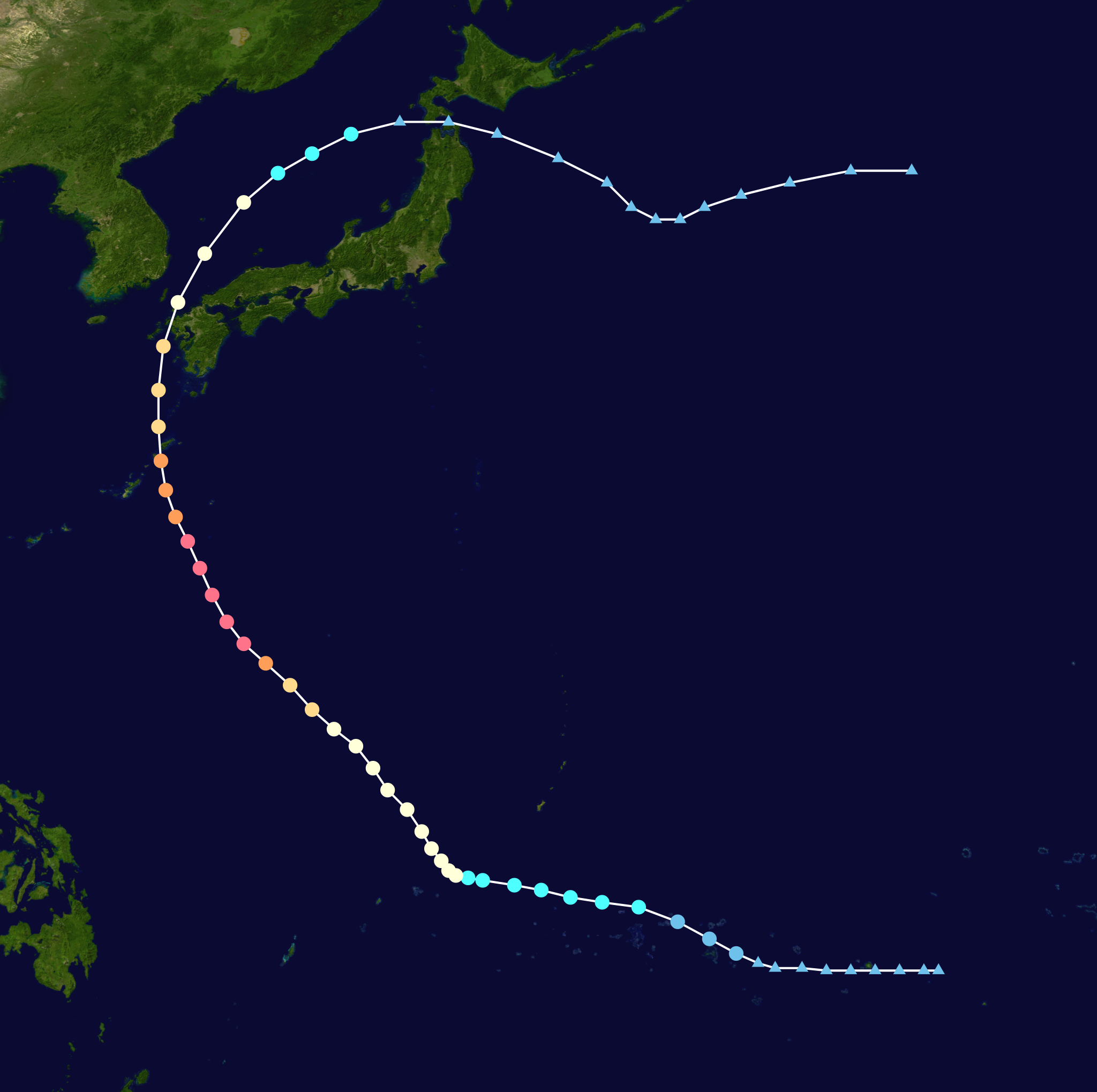
- Duration: August 1 – August 11
- Peak intensity: 155 km/h (100 mph) (10-min); 940 hPa (mbar)

The near equatorial trough spawned a tropical depression on July 30 over the open Western Pacific waters. It tracked to the west-northwest, becoming a tropical storm on the 2nd and a typhoon on the 4th. Robyn turned more to the northwest, where it reached a peak intensity of 145 mph (230 km/h) winds on the 7th. It weakened to a 100 mph (200 km/h) typhoon before hitting southwestern Japan on the 9th, and became extratropical on the 10th over the Sea of Japan. Robyn caused 45 fatalities, 39 of which were from traffic related accidents, and $68 million in damage (1993 USD).

=== Severe Tropical Storm Steve (Pining) ===
- Severe tropical storm (JMA)
- Category 1 typhoon (SSHWS)
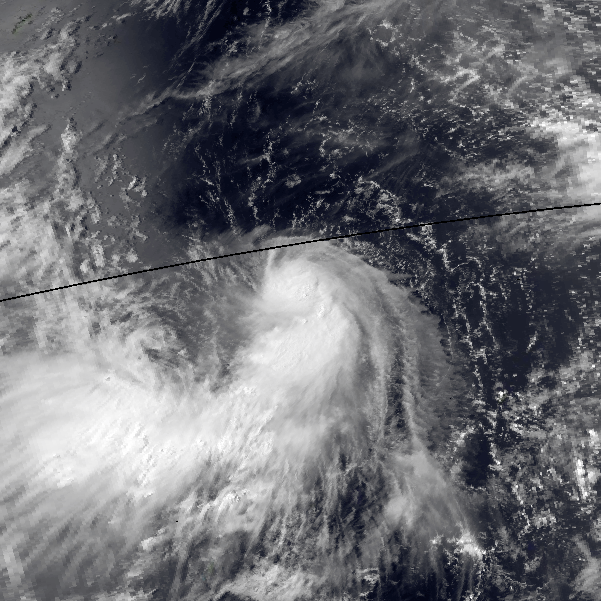
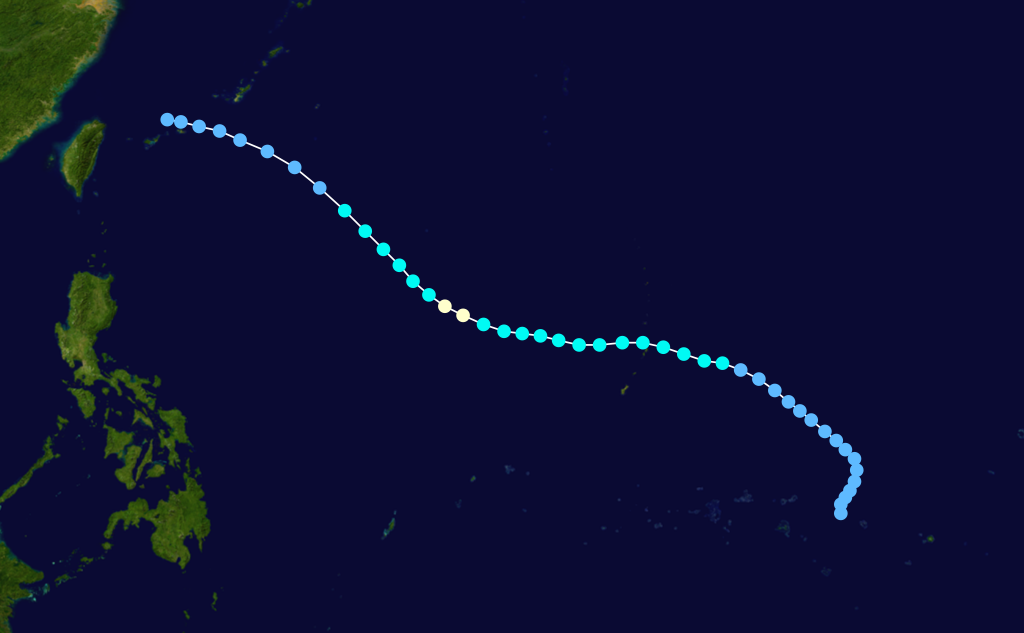
- Duration: August 5 – August 14
- Peak intensity: 100 km/h (65 mph) (10-min); 980 hPa (mbar)

Steve stayed clear from land.

=== Tropical Depression 15W ===
- Tropical depression (SSHWS)
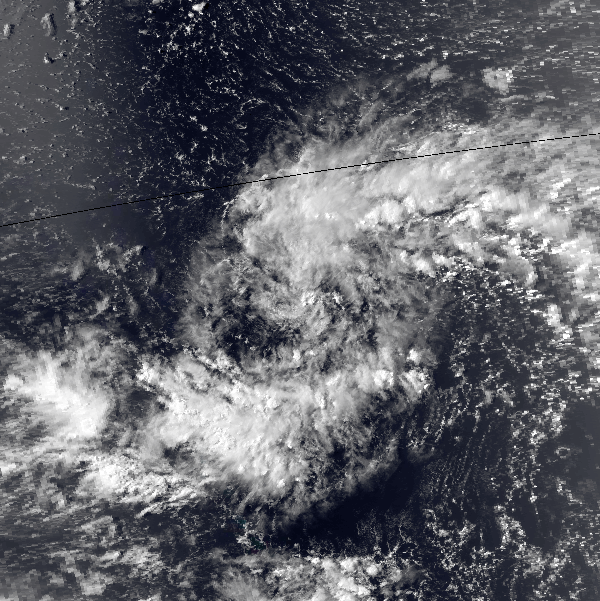
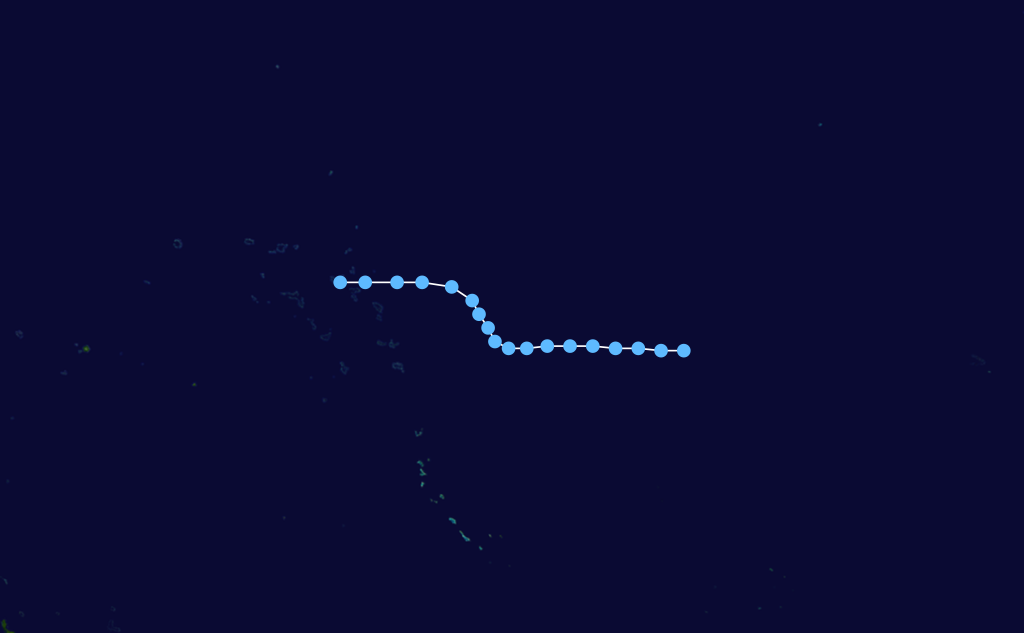
- Duration: August 13 – August 14
- Peak intensity: 45 km/h (30 mph) (1-min); 1002 hPa (mbar)

=== Typhoon Tasha (Rubing) ===
- Typhoon (JMA)
- Category 1 typhoon (SSHWS)
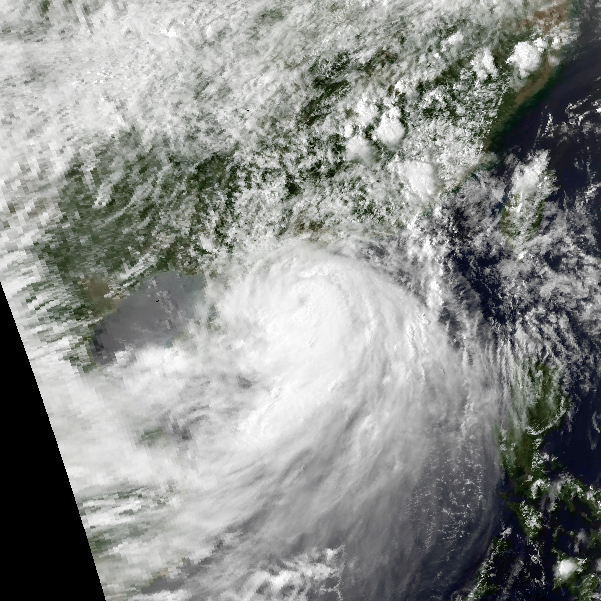
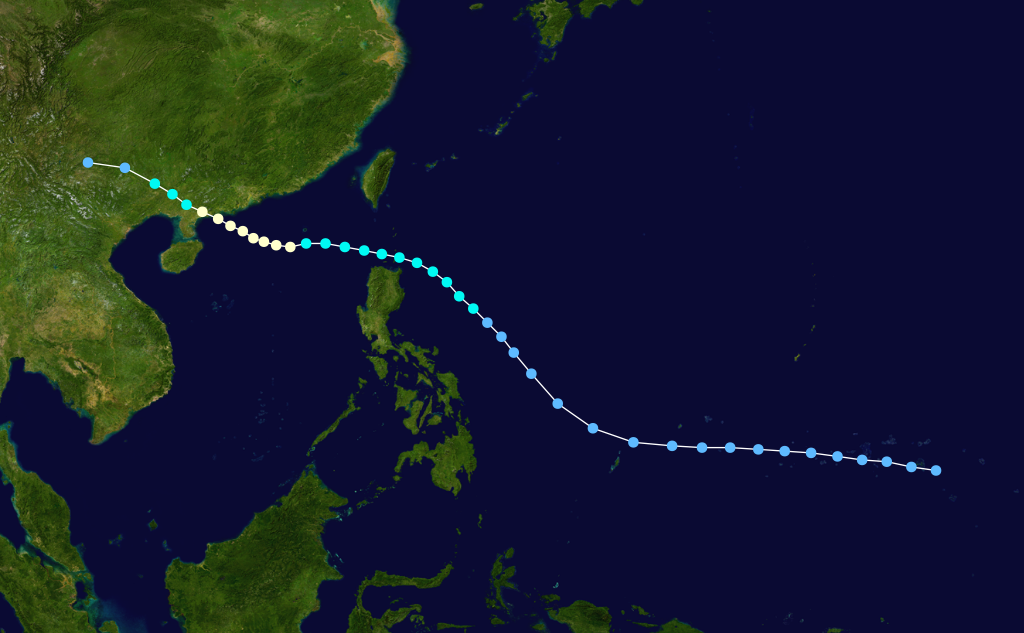
- Duration: August 13 – August 22
- Peak intensity: 120 km/h (75 mph) (10-min); 970 hPa (mbar)

Tasha hit China in August. Tasha killed one person and caused 520 million RMB (US$88.9 million) in damage.

=== Typhoon Keoni ===
- Very strong typhoon (JMA)
- Category 3 typhoon (SSHWS)
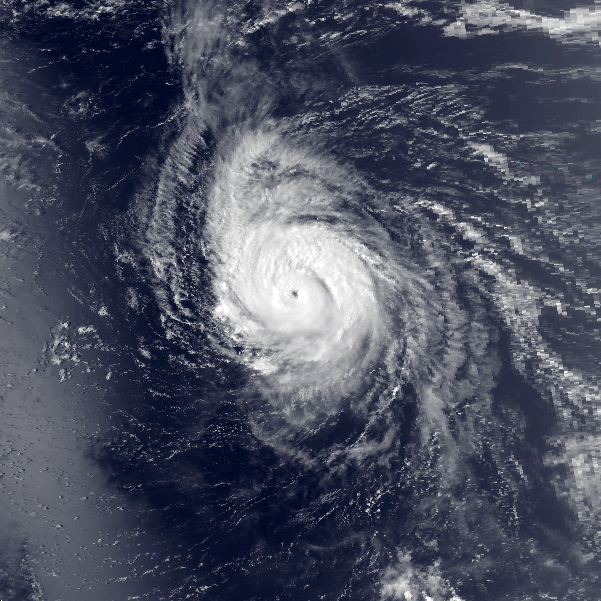
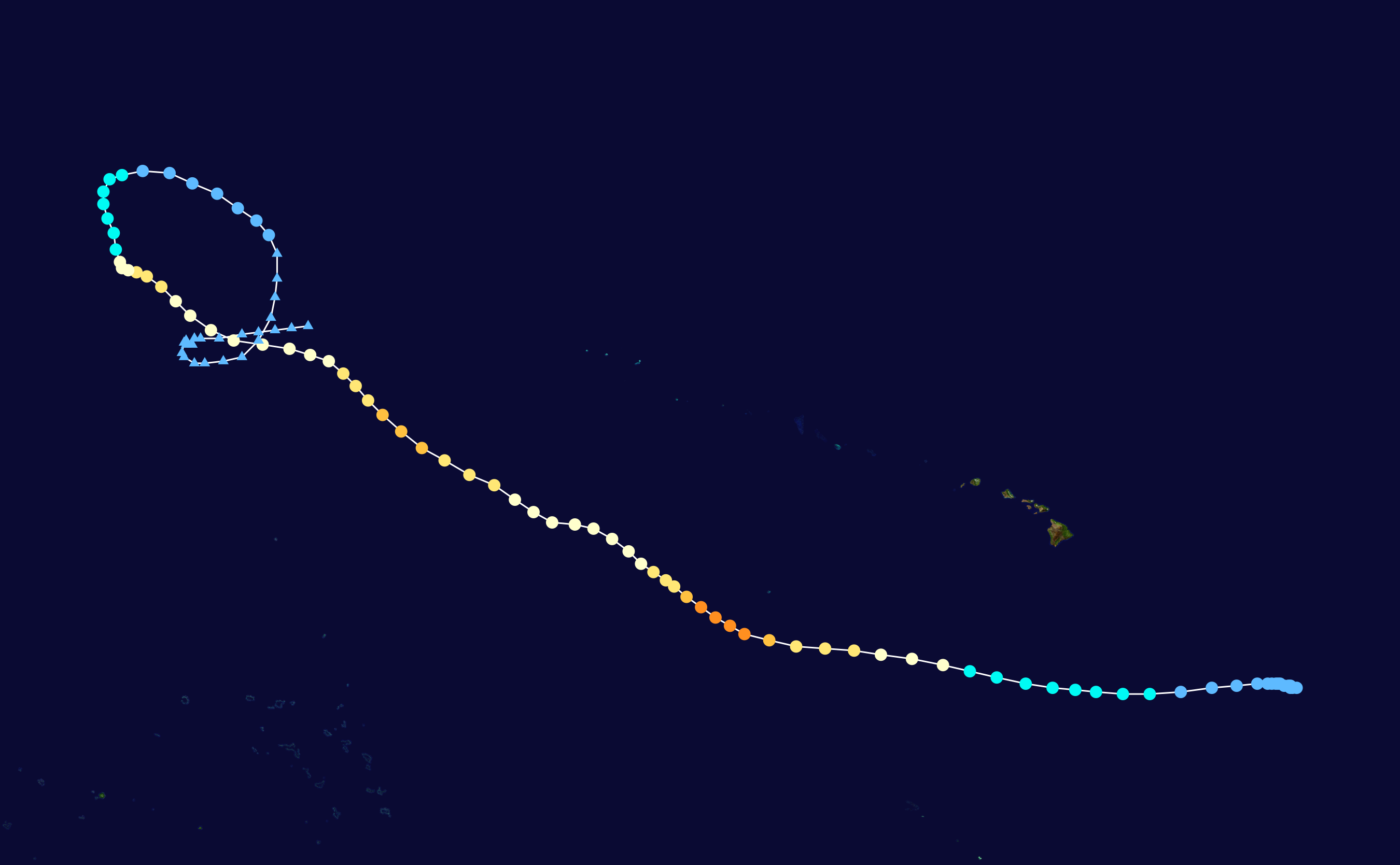
- Duration: August 19 (Entered basin) – September 3
- Peak intensity: 165 km/h (105 mph) (10-min); 940 hPa (mbar)

Keoni formed southeast of the Big Island of Hawaii on August 9, and was later classified as a named system south of the island chain. Keoni peaked as an intense Category 4 hurricane over open waters and lasted until the 29th, crossing the International Date Line and becoming a typhoon in the western Pacific, but never affected land.

=== Typhoon Vernon ===
- Typhoon (JMA)
- Category 1 typhoon (SSHWS)
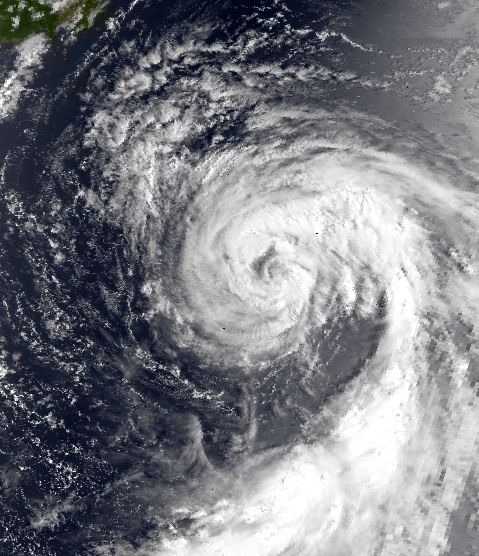
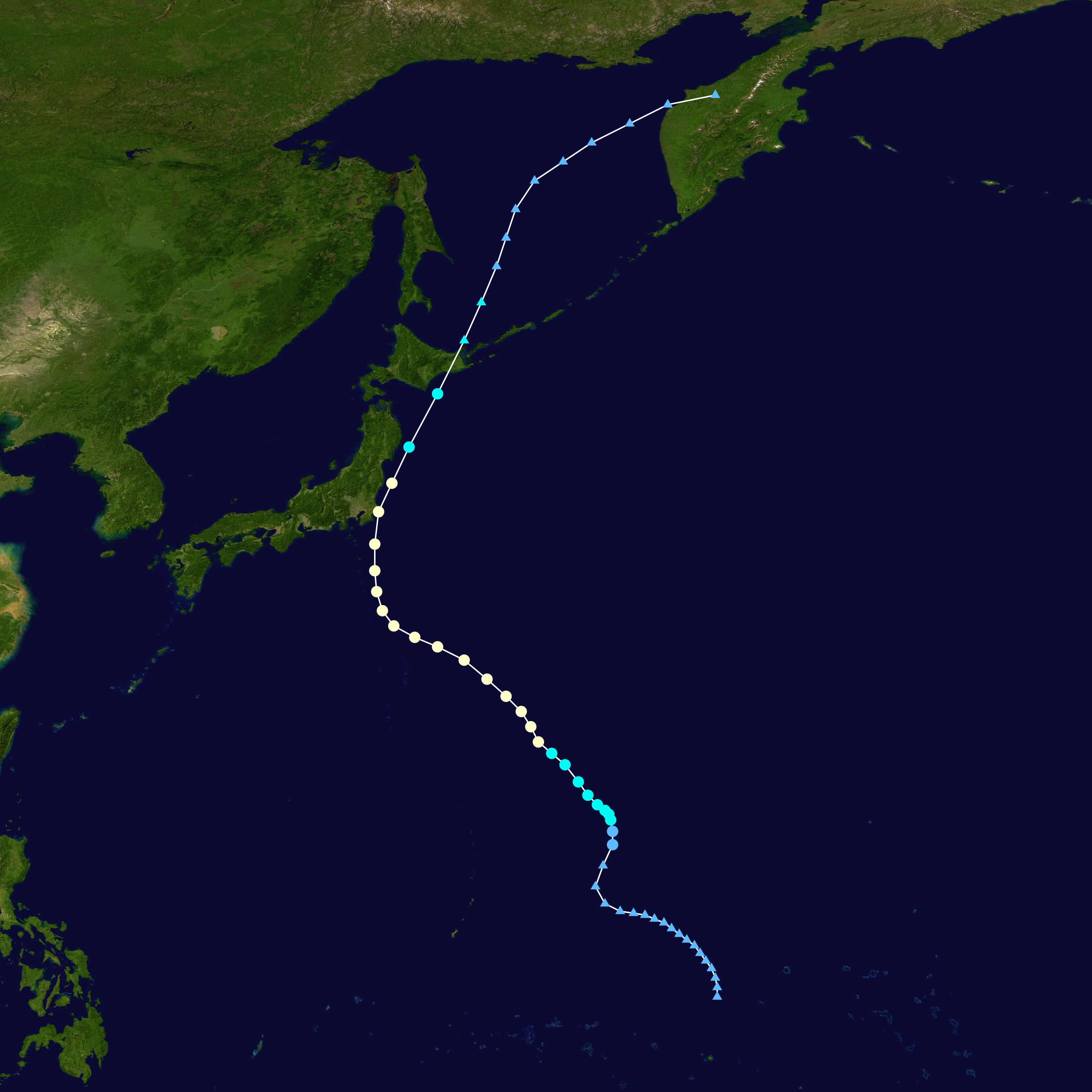
- Duration: August 21 – August 28
- Peak intensity: 130 km/h (80 mph) (10-min); 965 hPa (mbar)

The cyclone dropped heavy rainfall across much of the Japanese archipelago. A peak rainfall total occurred of 340 mm (13 in) at Mount Zaō, including a record 319 mm (12.6 in) in 24 hours. A peak hourly rainfall total of 64 mm (2.5 in) was observed in Tokyo. A wind gust of 76 km/h (47 mph) was recorded in Miyake-jima. Vernon caused 2 fatalities and 4 injuries.

=== Tropical Storm Winona (Saling) ===
- Tropical storm (JMA)
- Tropical storm (SSHWS)
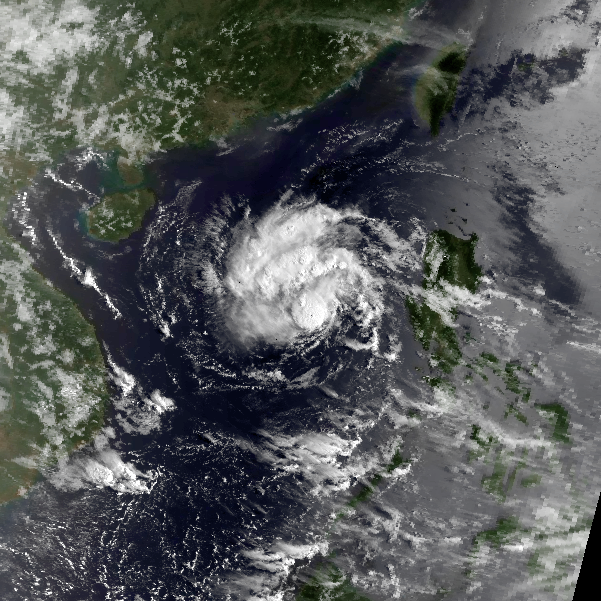
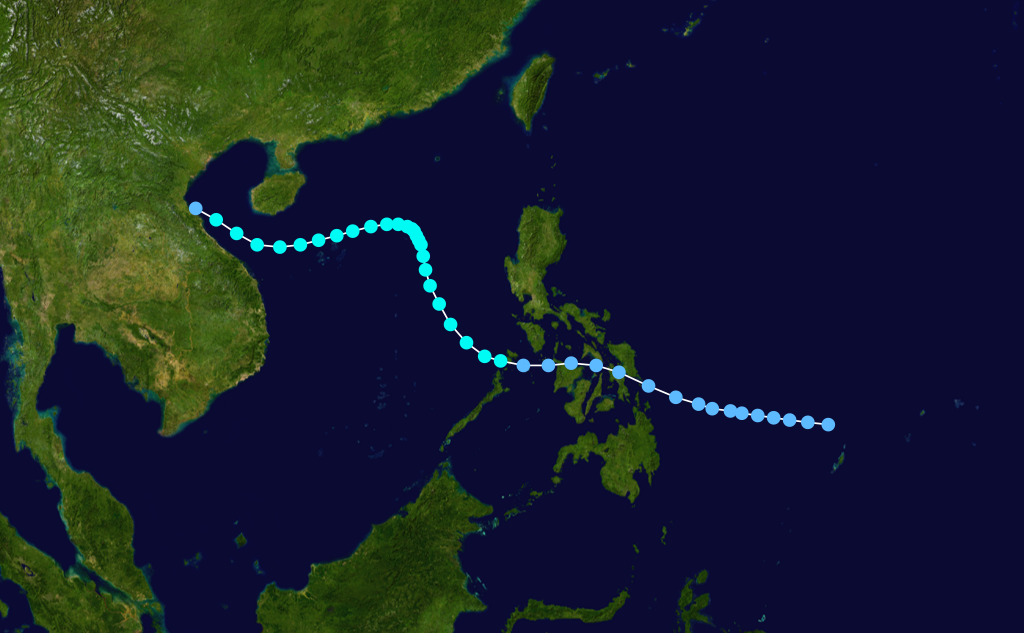
- Duration: August 21 – August 29
- Peak intensity: 75 km/h (45 mph) (10-min); 990 hPa (mbar)

Winona hit Philippines and Vietnam.

=== Typhoon Yancy (Tasing) ===
- Very strong typhoon (JMA)
- Category 4 super typhoon (SSHWS)
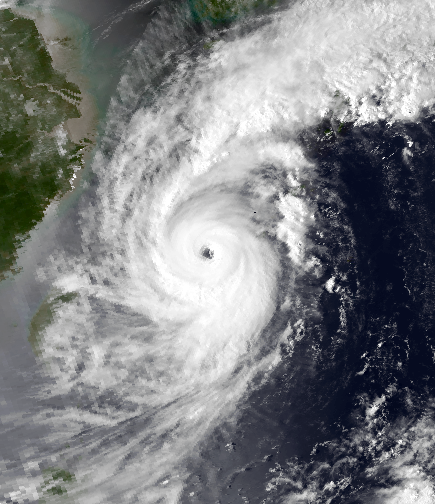
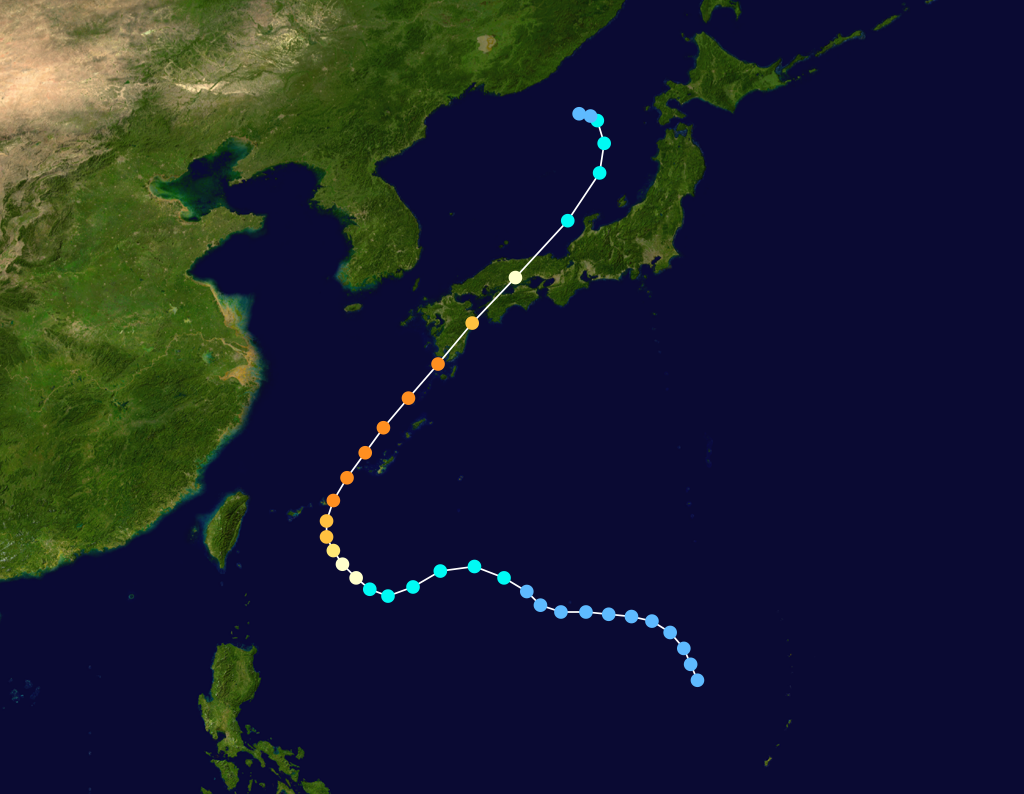
- Duration: August 29 – September 7
- Peak intensity: 175 km/h (110 mph) (10-min); 925 hPa (mbar)

The monsoon trough formed a tropical depression on August 27. It headed generally westward, reaching tropical storm strength on the 30th and typhoon strength on the 31st. Yancy turned to the northeast, where it rapidly intensified to a 150 mph (240 km/h) super typhoon on the 2nd. The storm weakened to a 135 mph (217 km/h) typhoon before making landfall on southwestern Japan on the 3rd, and dissipated 2 days later over the Sea of Japan. Yancy brought strong winds to Japan, amounting to 42 casualties and widespread damage.

=== Severe Tropical Storm Zola (Unsing) ===
- Severe tropical storm (JMA)
- Tropical storm (SSHWS)
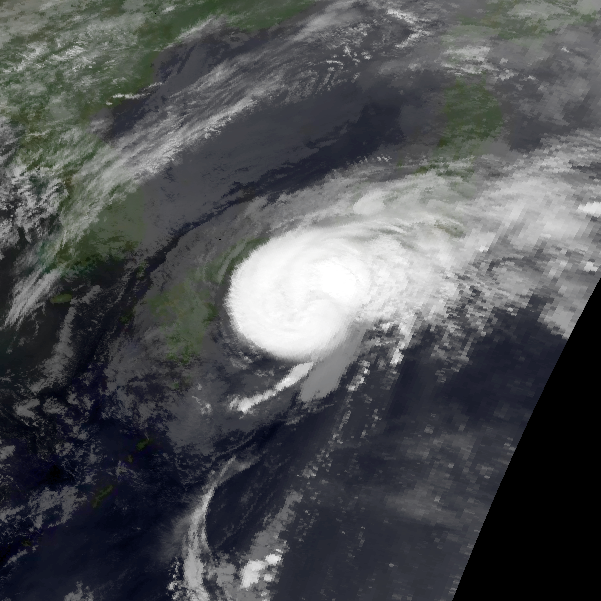
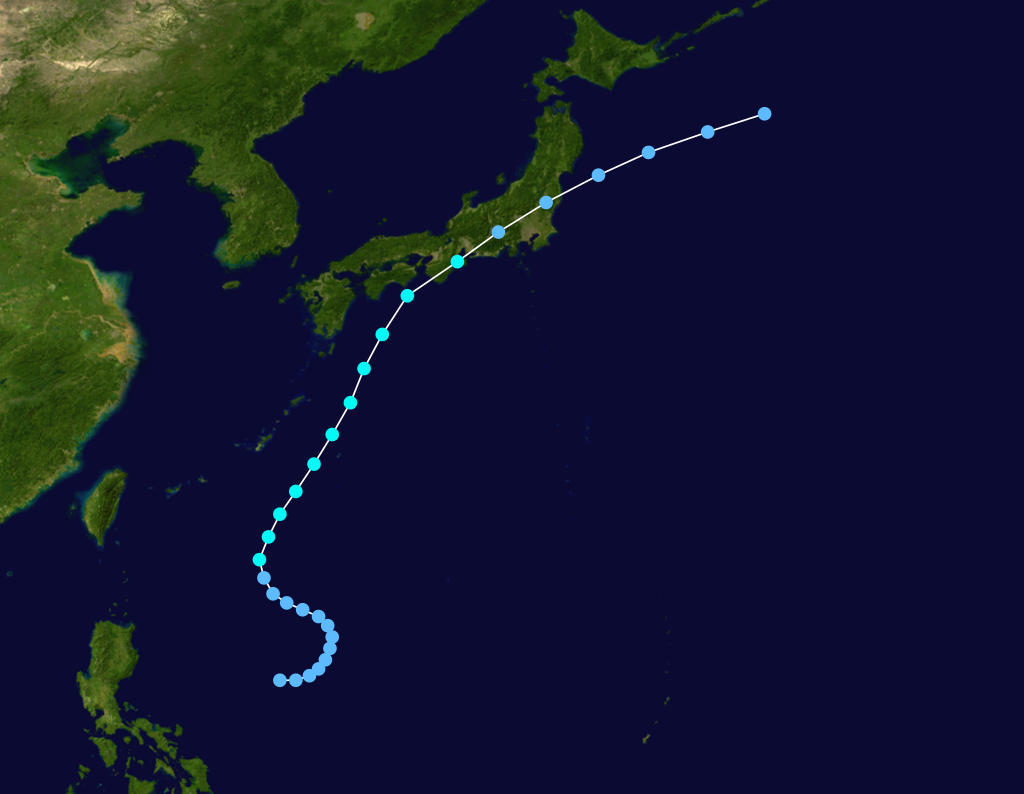
- Duration: September 5 – September 9
- Peak intensity: 95 km/h (60 mph) (10-min); 985 hPa (mbar)

Zola was another weak system that hit Japan.

=== Typhoon Abe (Walding) ===
- Very strong typhoon (JMA)
- Category 3 typhoon (SSHWS)
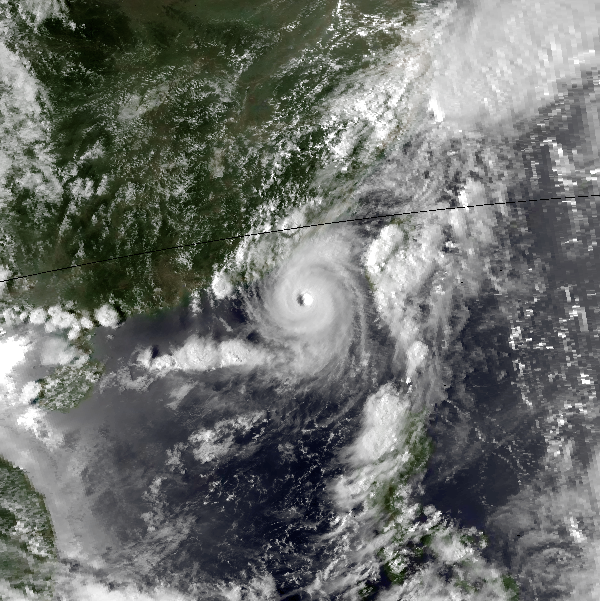
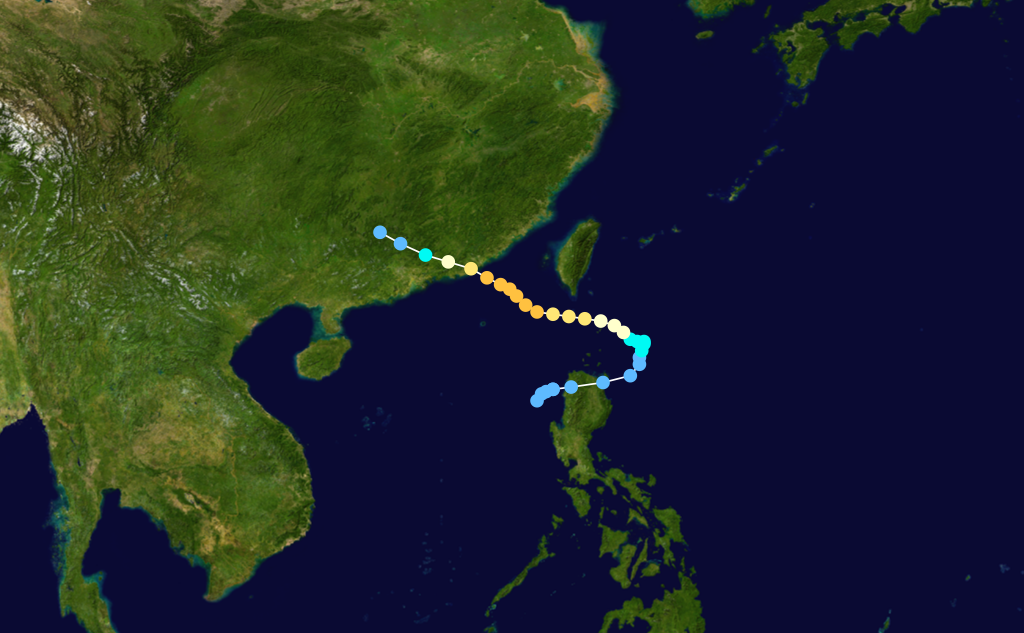
- Duration: September 9 – September 15
- Peak intensity: 155 km/h (100 mph) (10-min); 945 hPa (mbar)

Abe was another Typhoon that hit China.

Abe brought strong winds and heavy rain to Taiwan as it passed south of the island. One person was killed from flash flooding. In Shantou and Jieyang, 11 people were killed and 290 people were injured. 116,000 homes, along with numerous crops, telephone poles, and roads suffered damage. Economic losses are at 1.685 billion RMB (US$288 million). In Hong Kong, a man drowned. However, damage to the region was minor.

=== Severe Tropical Storm Becky (Yeyeng) ===
- Severe tropical storm (JMA)
- Category 1 typhoon (SSHWS)
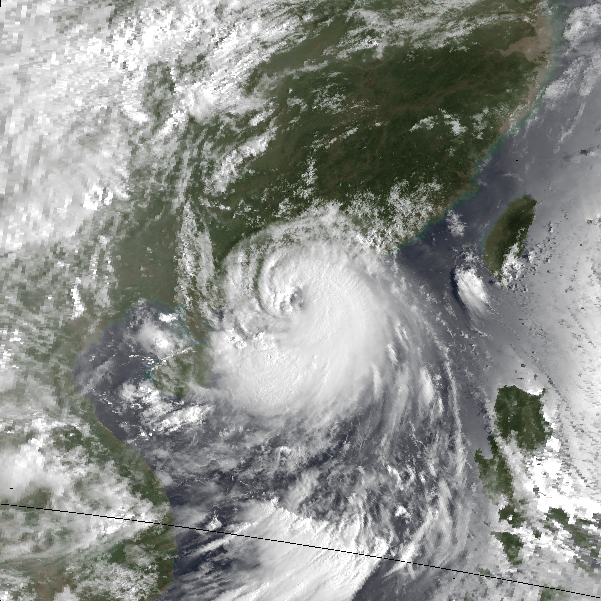
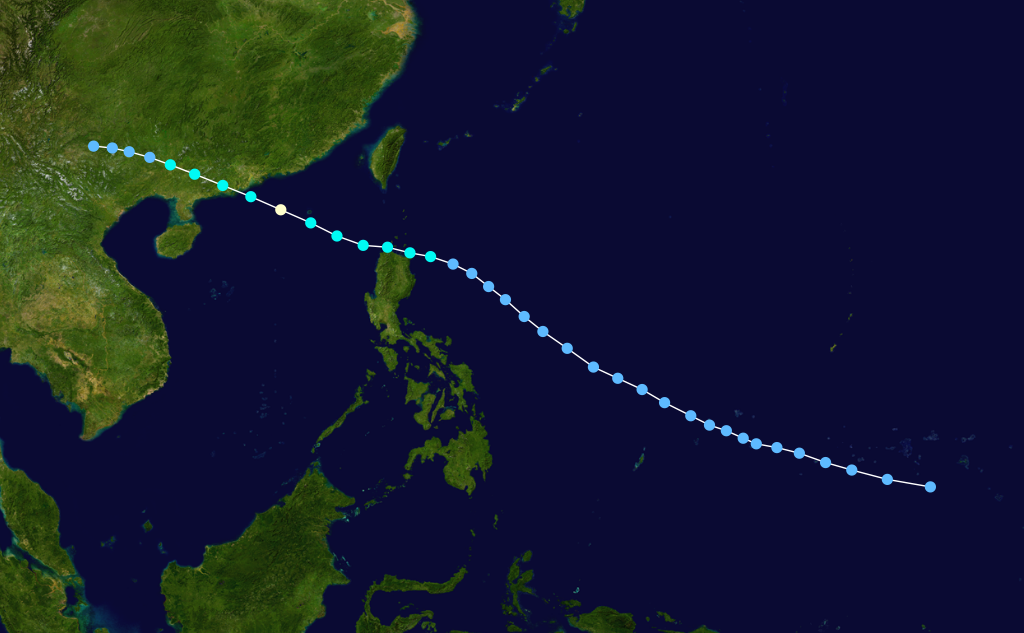
- Duration: September 13 – September 18
- Peak intensity: 100 km/h (65 mph) (10-min); 980 hPa (mbar)

Becky struck China to the west of Macau at full force. The offshore waters in the southern and southwestern part of Hong Kong recorded hurricane-force winds where its hourly mean winds reached 122 km/h with gusts up to 176 km/h at Waglan Island. In Cheung Chau, winds increased significantly to 115 km/h hourly before undergoing maintenance; privately recorded its hourly winds of up to 128 km/h during its first hour of maintenance there in Cheung Chau, and up to 139 km/h 60-minute mean wind just before undergoing maintenance. In Tai Mo Shan, its hourly mean winds reached 155 km/h.

Becky was clearly underestimated and the hurricane signal 10 should have been hoisted as it was justified (hurricane-force winds recorded at southwestern part of Hong Kong when Becky traversed at about 110 km south-southwest of the Royal Observatory). Its maximum 10 minute sustained wind speed was estimated to be at around 150 km/h at its closet approach to Hong Kong.

The typhoon killed 1 taxi driver at a car accident in Hong Kong. As of 2017, Becky was revised and upgraded to a minimal typhoon. Seven people in Guangdong were killed. 7,000 homes were destroyed and 50,000 homes were damaged. Agriculture was badly affected. Damages totaled to 1.52 billion RMB (US$260 million).

=== Typhoon Dot (Anding) ===
- Typhoon (JMA)
- Category 1 typhoon (SSHWS)
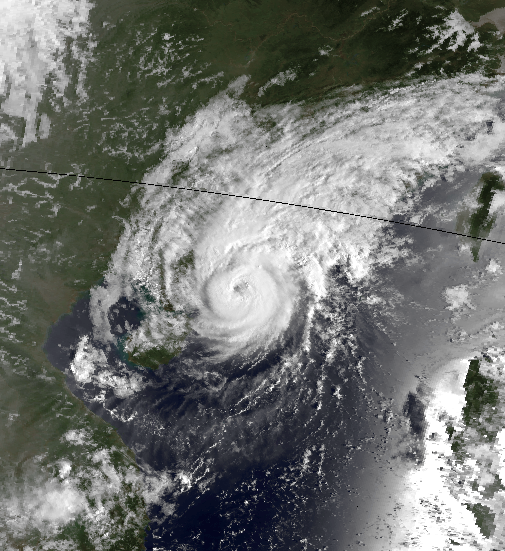
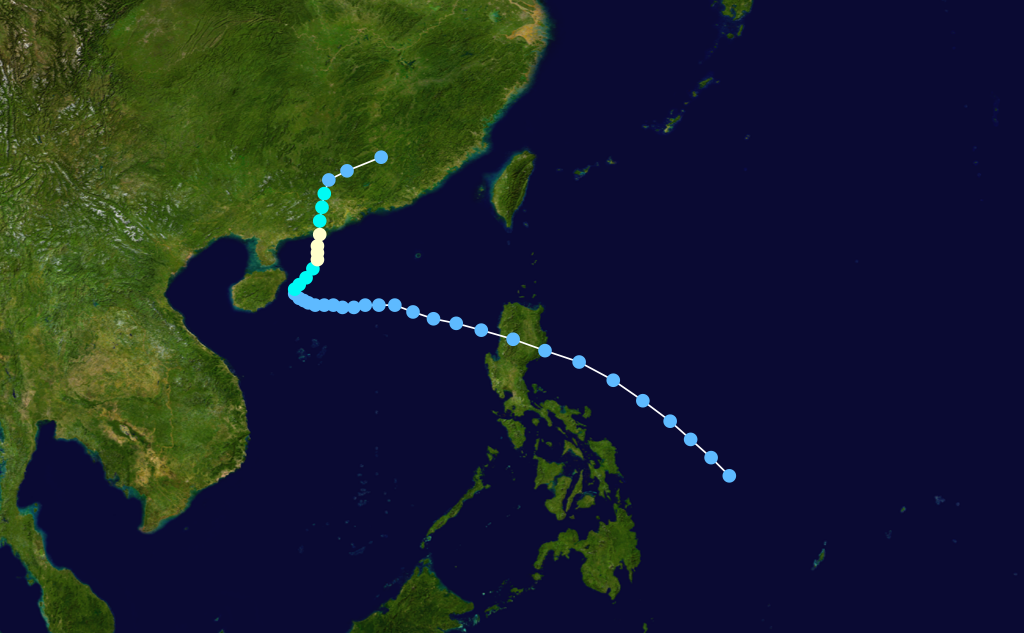
- Duration: September 19 – September 27
- Peak intensity: 130 km/h (80 mph) (10-min); 965 hPa (mbar)

Dot struck China as well. Initially posing a direct hit to Hong Kong but it slowly moved north, striking the coast of western Guangdong. Dot damaged 31,000 homes and killed two people. Damage was estimated at 1.36 billion RMB (US$233 million).

=== Typhoon Cecil ===
- Typhoon (JMA)
- Category 3 typhoon (SSHWS)
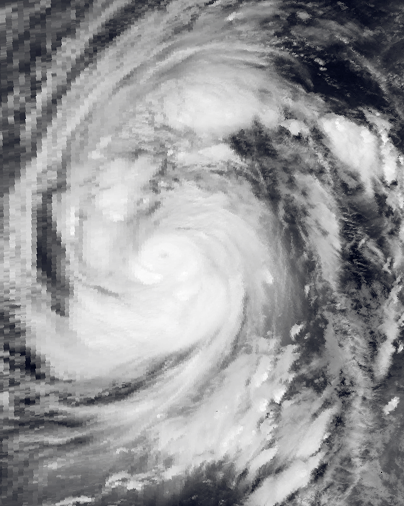
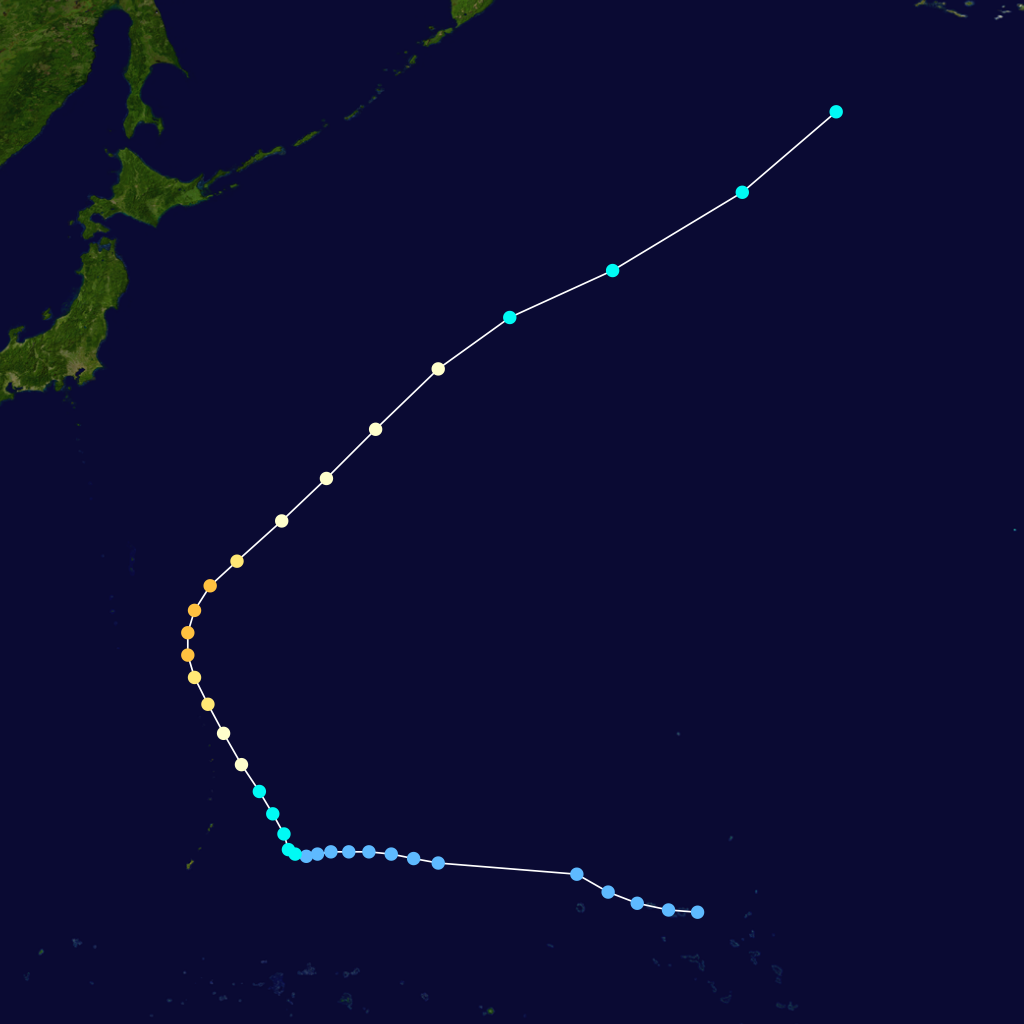
- Duration: September 22 – September 27
- Peak intensity: 150 km/h (90 mph) (10-min); 950 hPa (mbar)

Cecil recurved out to sea.

=== Tropical Depression Binang ===
- Tropical depression (PAGASA)
- Duration: September 25 – September 25
- Peak intensity: Winds not specified; 1004 hPa (mbar)

=== Super Typhoon Ed (Dinang) ===
- Very strong typhoon (JMA)
- Category 5 super typhoon (SSHWS)
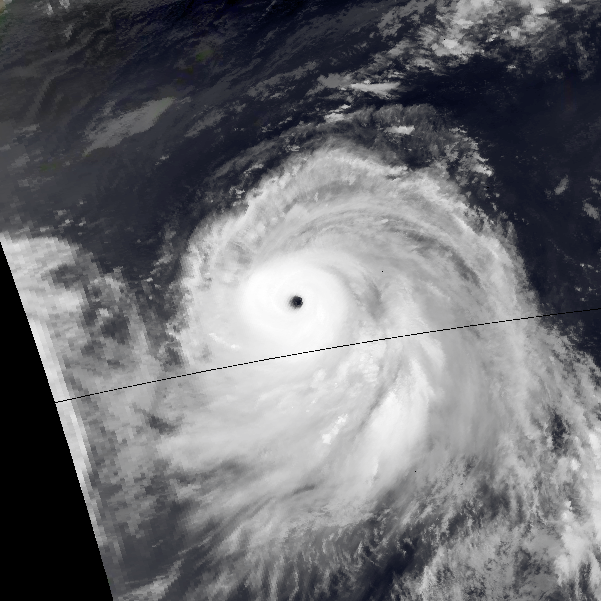
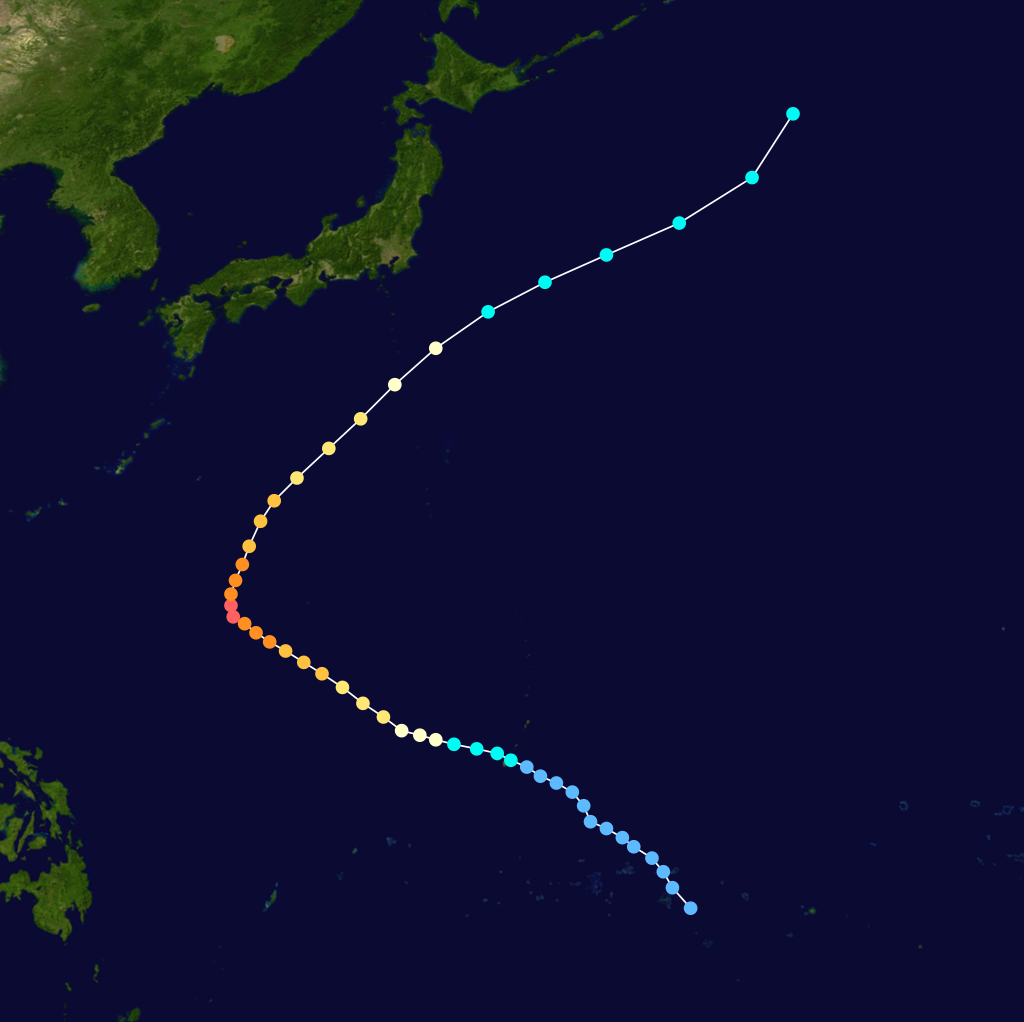
- Duration: September 30 – October 8
- Peak intensity: 185 km/h (115 mph) (10-min); 915 hPa (mbar)

Ed was a potent typhoon but did not affect land. It was also the only Category 5 during the season.

=== Typhoon Flo (Kadiang) ===
- Typhoon (JMA)
- Category 1 typhoon (SSHWS)
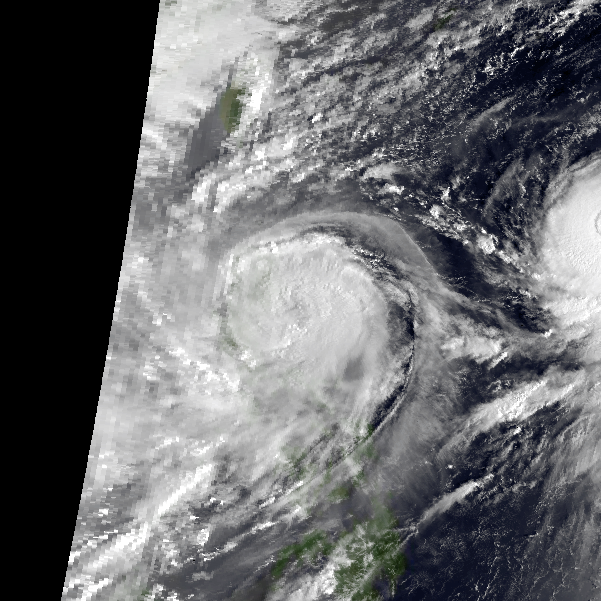
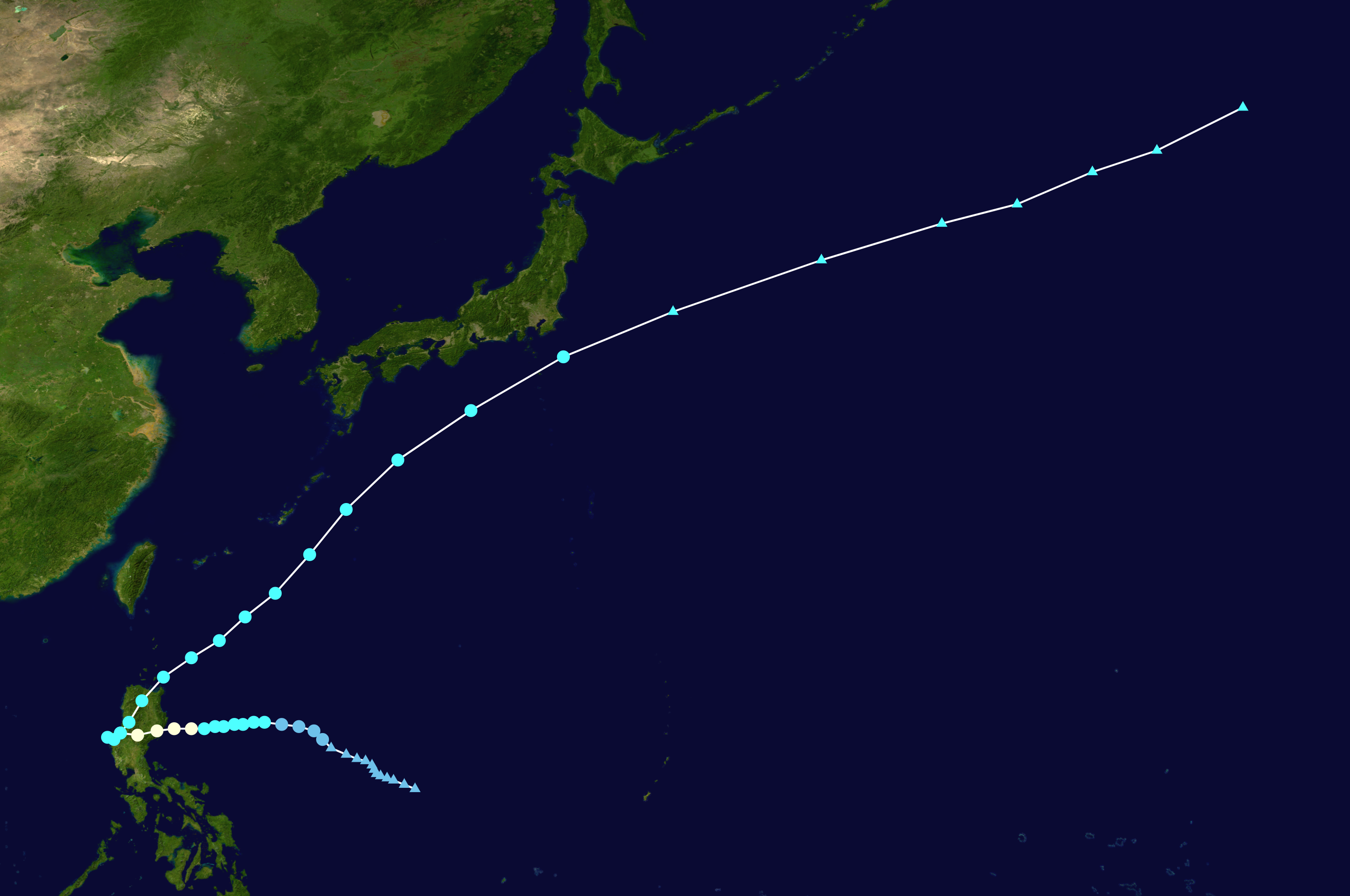
- Duration: October 1 – October 8
- Peak intensity: 120 km/h (75 mph) (10-min); 970 hPa (mbar)

Typhoon Flo hit the northern Philippines on October 4 as a minimal typhoon, having developed on the 28th from the monsoon trough. It stalled just off the west coast, and turned northeastward, becoming extratropical on the 9th. Flo caused at least 500 deaths from the heavy flooding on Luzon. Flo interacted with the nearby Ed, causing Flo to recurve eastwards. Flo’s recurving resulted prolonged rainfall across Luzon.

=== Tropical Storm Gene (Gundang) ===
- Tropical storm (JMA)
- Tropical storm (SSHWS)
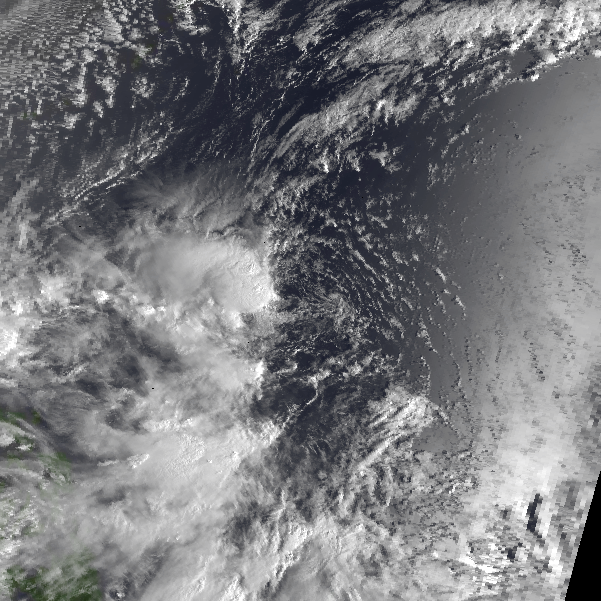
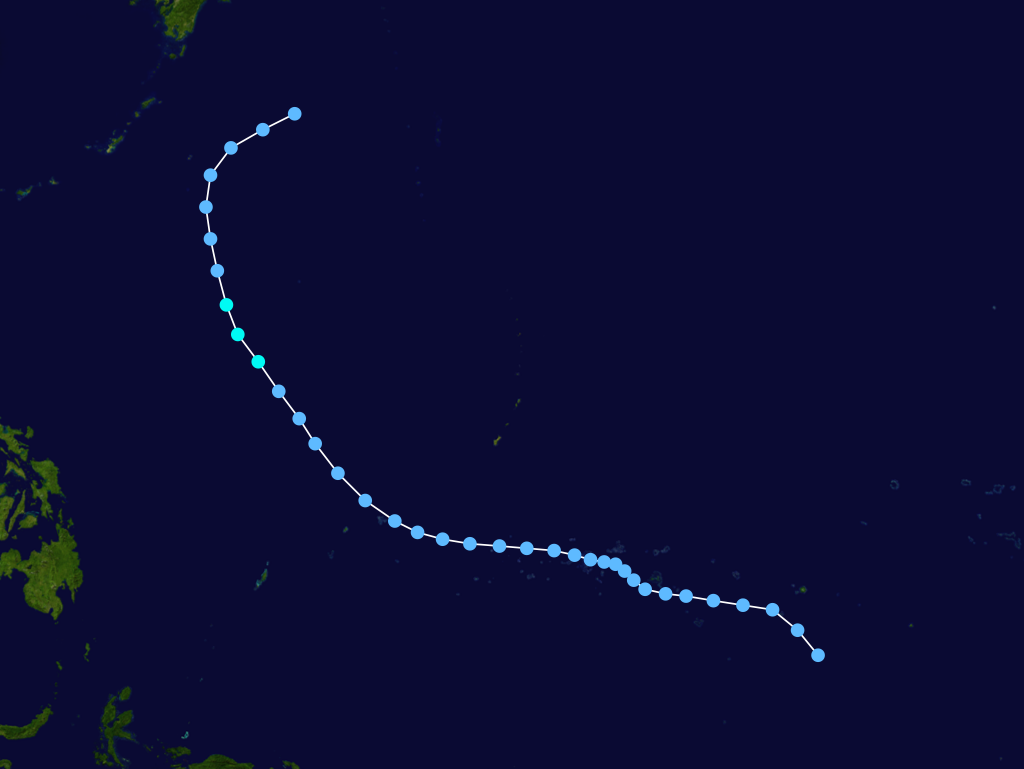
- Duration: October 7 – October 10
- Peak intensity: 65 km/h (40 mph) (10-min); 998 hPa (mbar)

Gene was a weak system that stayed away from land.

=== Tropical Depression 28W (Epang) ===
- Tropical depression (PAGASA)
- Tropical depression (SSHWS)
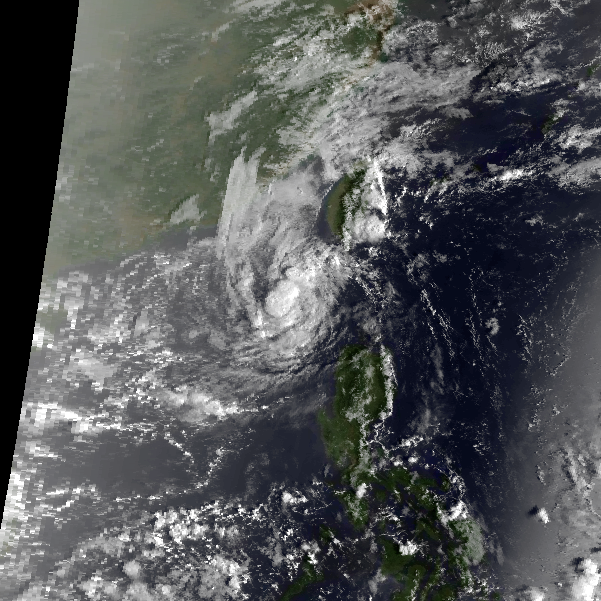
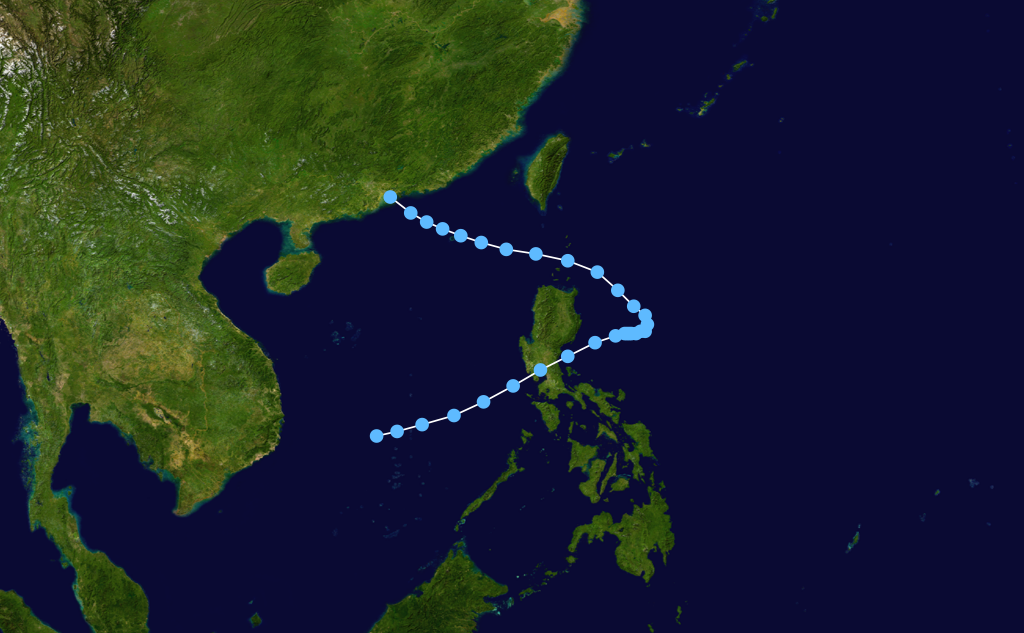
- Duration: October 7 – October 13
- Peak intensity: 45 km/h (30 mph) (10-min); 1008 hPa (mbar)

The depression criss crossed land.

=== Severe Tropical Storm Hattie ===
- Severe tropical storm (JMA)
- Tropical storm (SSHWS)
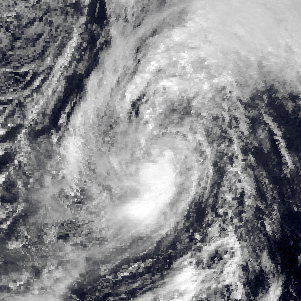
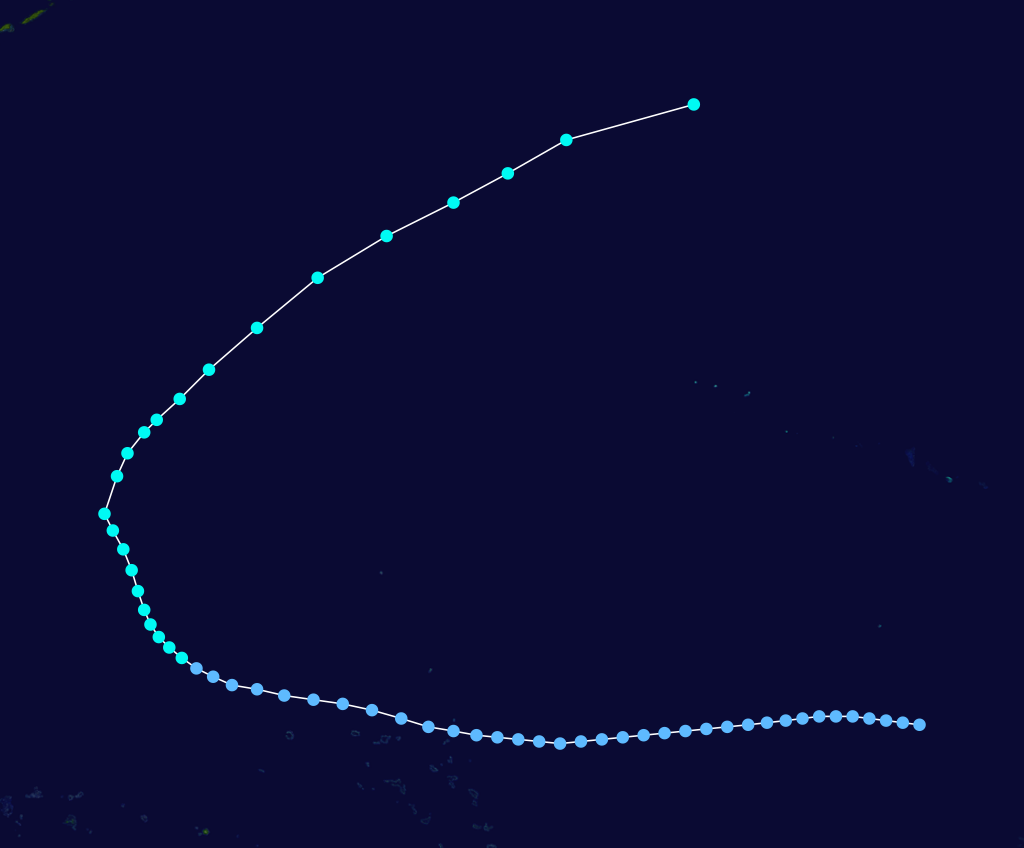
- Duration: October 19 – October 25
- Peak intensity: 95 km/h (60 mph) (10-min); 980 hPa (mbar)

Hattie recurved from land.

=== Typhoon Ira (Husing) ===
- Typhoon (JMA)
- Category 4 typhoon (SSHWS)
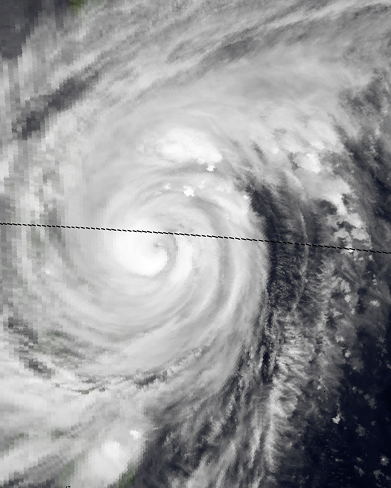
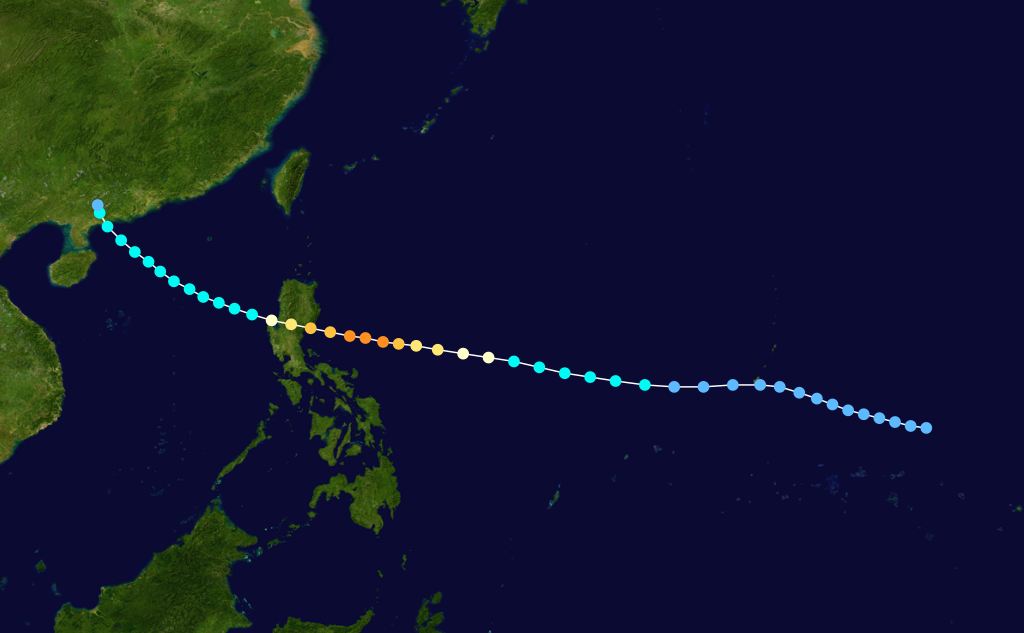
- Duration: October 27 – November 5
- Peak intensity: 150 km/h (90 mph) (10-min); 950 hPa (mbar)

Ira struck the Philippines. It also wreaked havoc in Hong Kong, causing an aircraft to slide off the runway at Kai Tak Airport after landing in blind weather. Ira triggered numerous landslides in the Philippines, destroying many homes and killing 21 people. Losses in the Philippines were US$60 million. In Guangdong, 3,700 homes were damaged or destroyed. Losses were US$16 million.

=== Tropical Storm Jeana ===
- Tropical storm (JMA)
- Tropical storm (SSHWS)
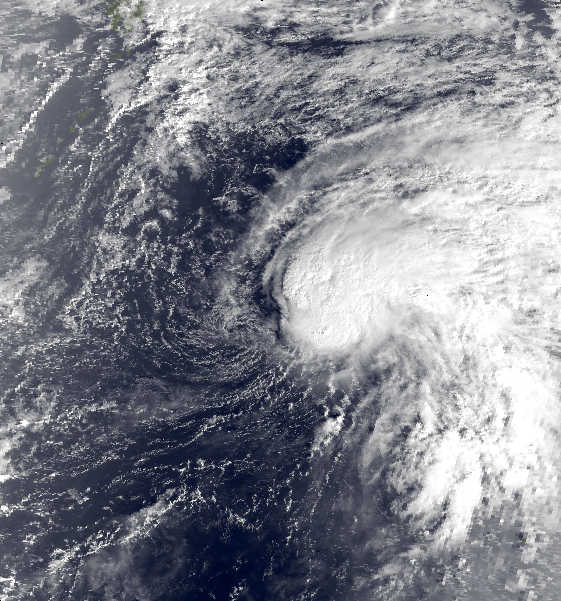
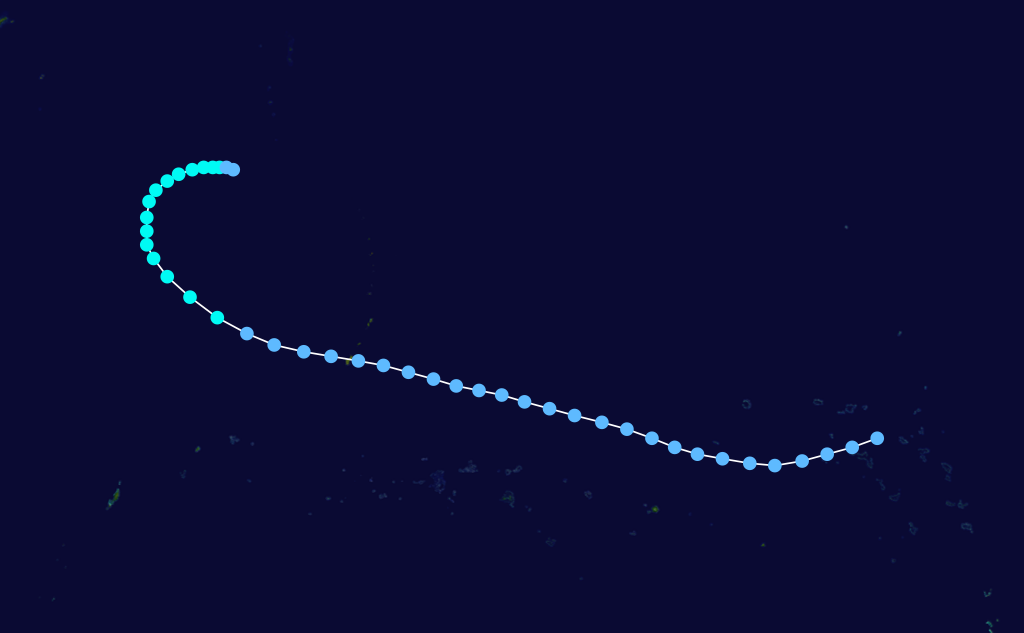
- Duration: November 5 – November 13
- Peak intensity: 85 km/h (50 mph) (10-min); 992 hPa (mbar)

Jeana stayed at sea.

=== Tropical Depression 32W (Indang) ===
- Tropical depression (SSHWS)
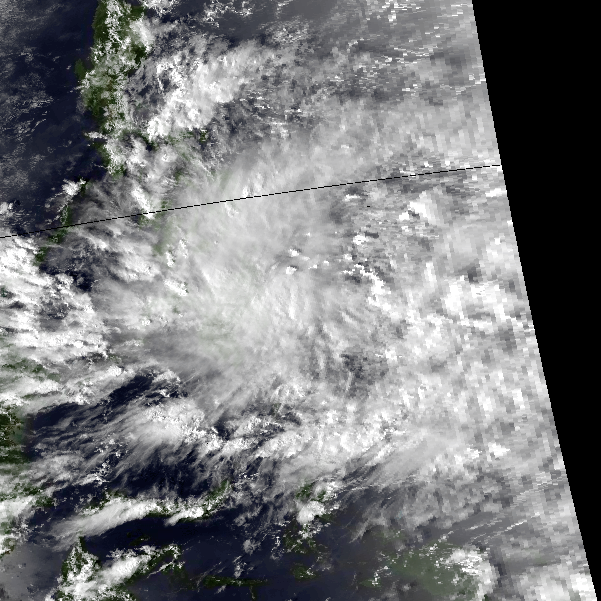
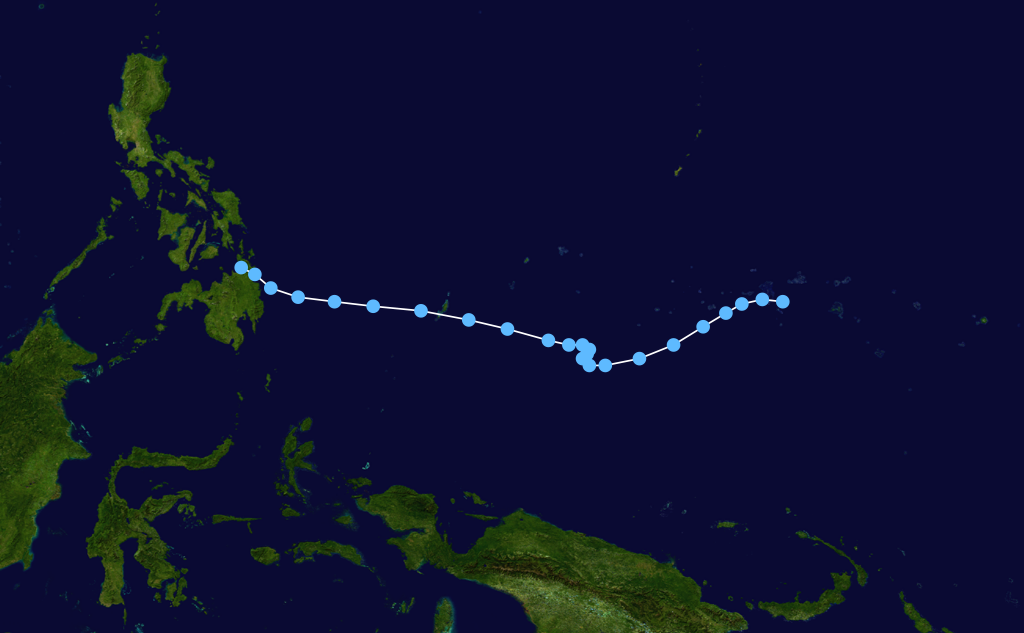
- Duration: November 13 – November 19
- Peak intensity: 45 km/h (30 mph) (1-min); 1002 hPa (mbar)

32W was long-lived.

=== Tropical Depression 33W ===
- Tropical depression (SSHWS)
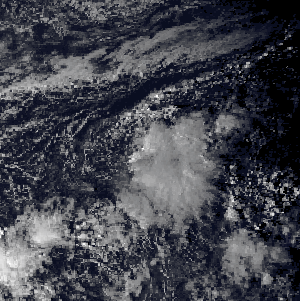
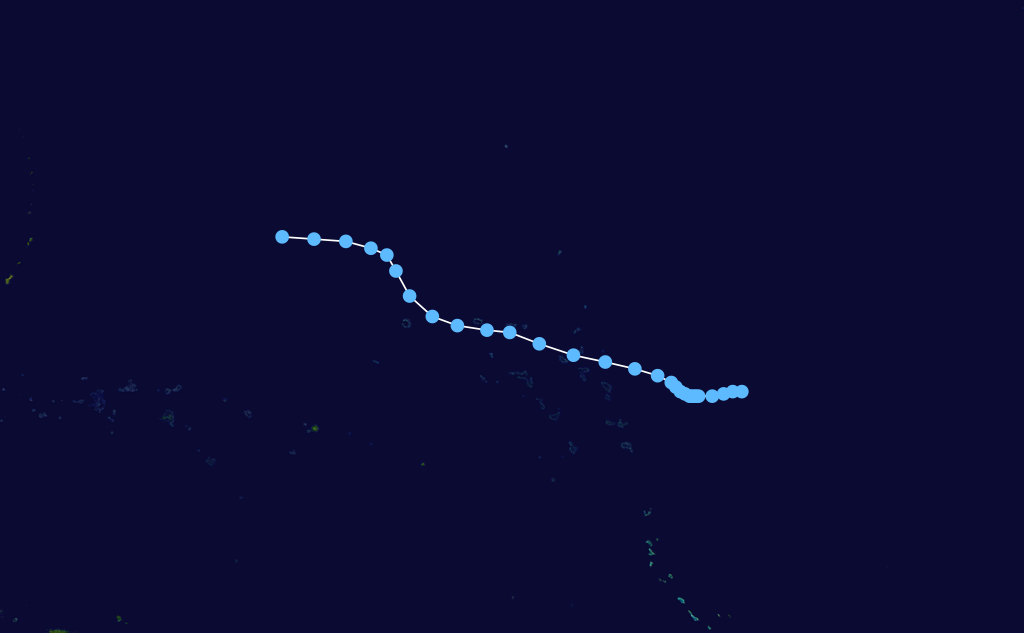
- Duration: November 18 – November 19
- Peak intensity: 45 km/h (30 mph) (1-min); 1002 hPa (mbar)

33W was short-lived.

=== Typhoon Kyle (Luring) ===
- Typhoon (JMA)
- Category 2 typhoon (SSHWS)
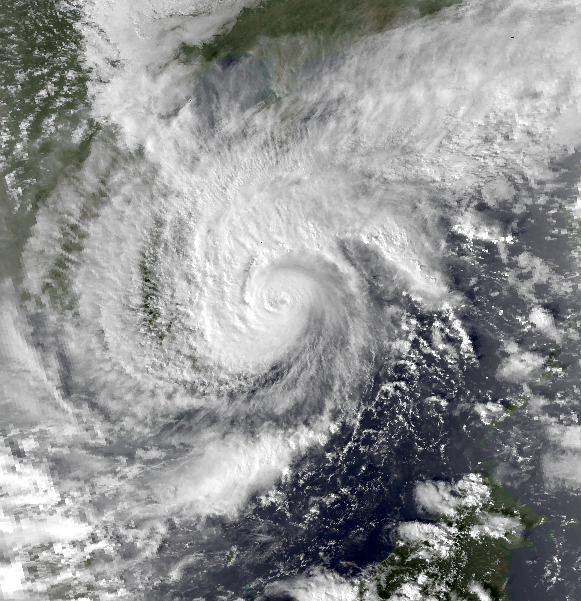
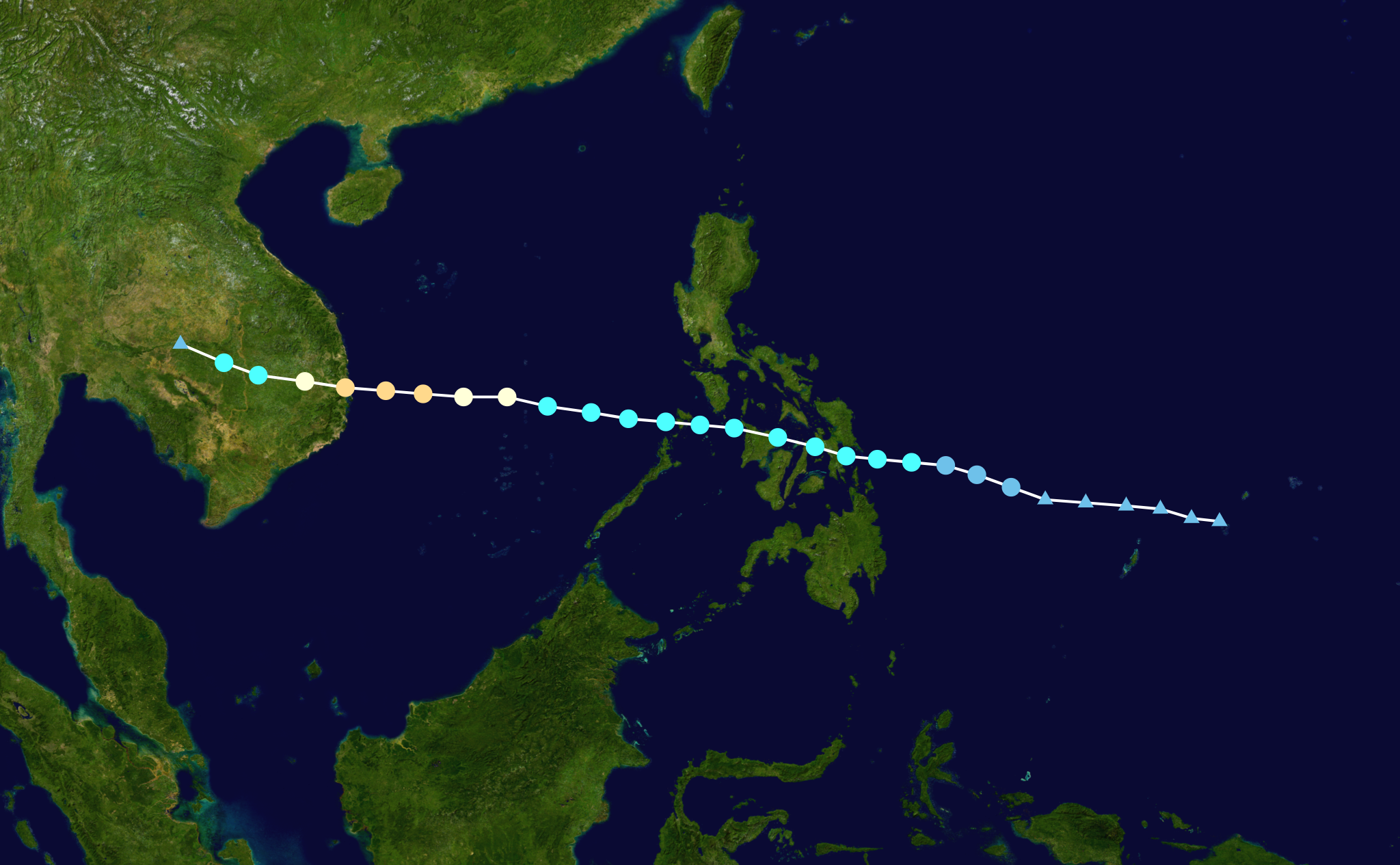
- Duration: November 17 – November 24
- Peak intensity: 130 km/h (80 mph) (10-min); 960 hPa (mbar)

Kyle was yet another Philippines striking system. It also hit Vietnam. Sustained wind speeds of 144 km/h (89 mph) were measured at a weather station in Tuy Hoà (Phú Yên); however, at the time of observation, this station was using a Vild/Wild anemometer (a pressure plate anemometer) with low accuracy. The lowest barometric pressure recorded within the typhoon at this same station was 989.0 hPa (29.21 inHg).

=== Typhoon Lola (Monang) ===
- Typhoon (JMA)
- Category 3 typhoon (SSHWS)
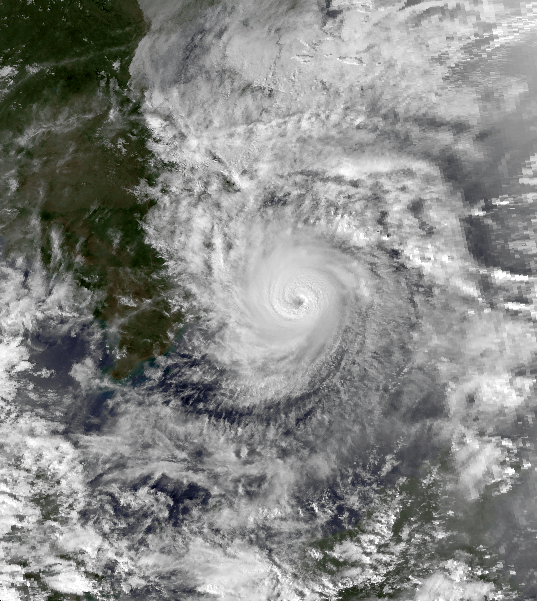
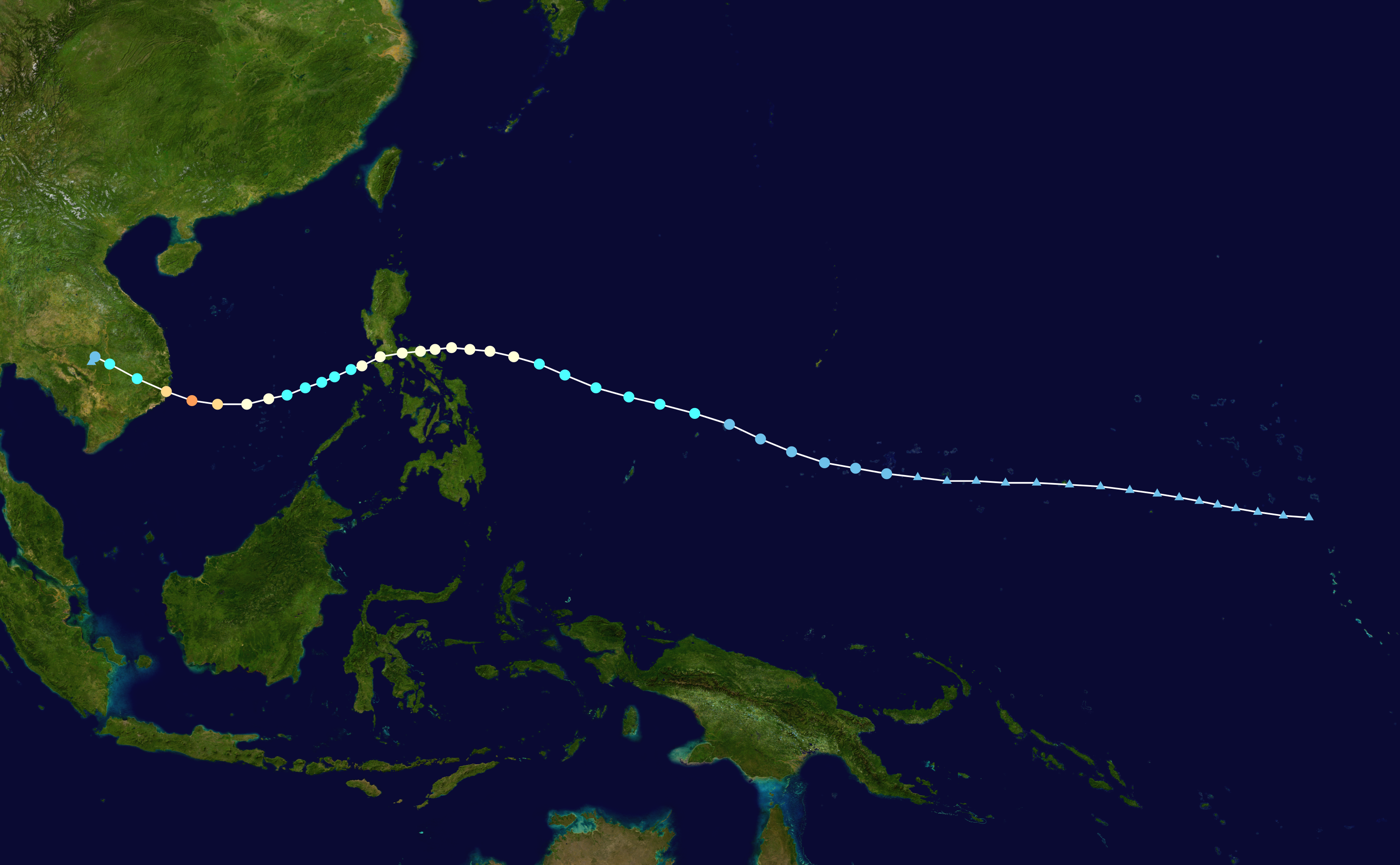
- Duration: December 1 – December 9
- Peak intensity: 150 km/h (90 mph) (10-min); 955 hPa (mbar)

The near equatorial trough spawned a tropical depression on November 27. It moved westward without significant development until December 2, when it became a tropical storm. Lola became a typhoon 2 days later, and hit the Philippines on the 5th. It weakened to a tropical storm after crossing the islands, but restrengthened to a 125 mph (200 km/h) typhoon before hitting southern Vietnam on the 8th. Lola quickly dissipated, not after causing 308 fatalities, 230 of which were in the Philippines from the heavy rains.

The lowest air pressure recorded in Nha Trang (Khánh Hoà) during the typhoon was 999.4 hPa (29.51 inHg).

=== Typhoon Manny (Naning) ===
- Typhoon (JMA)
- Category 4 typhoon (SSHWS)
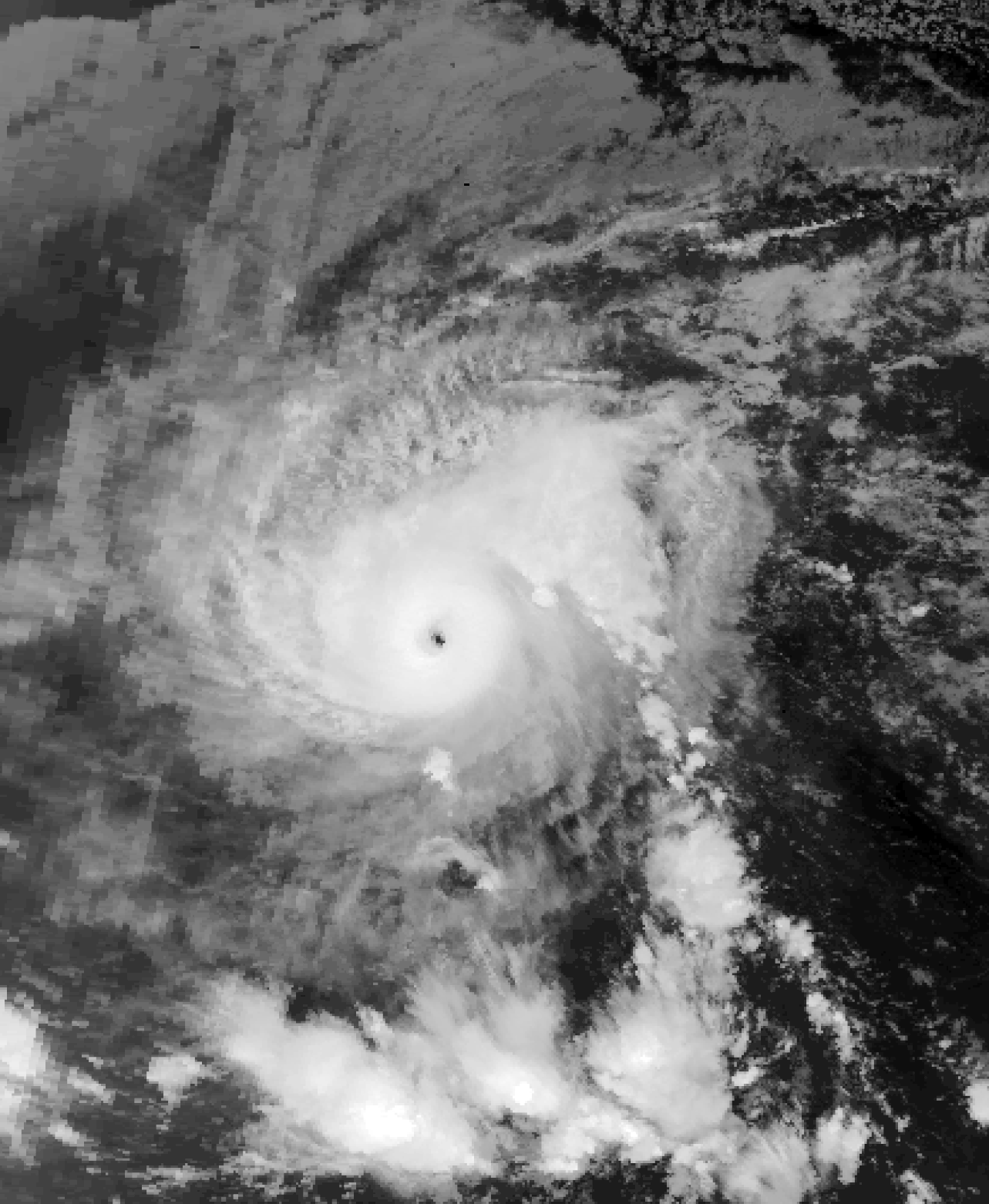
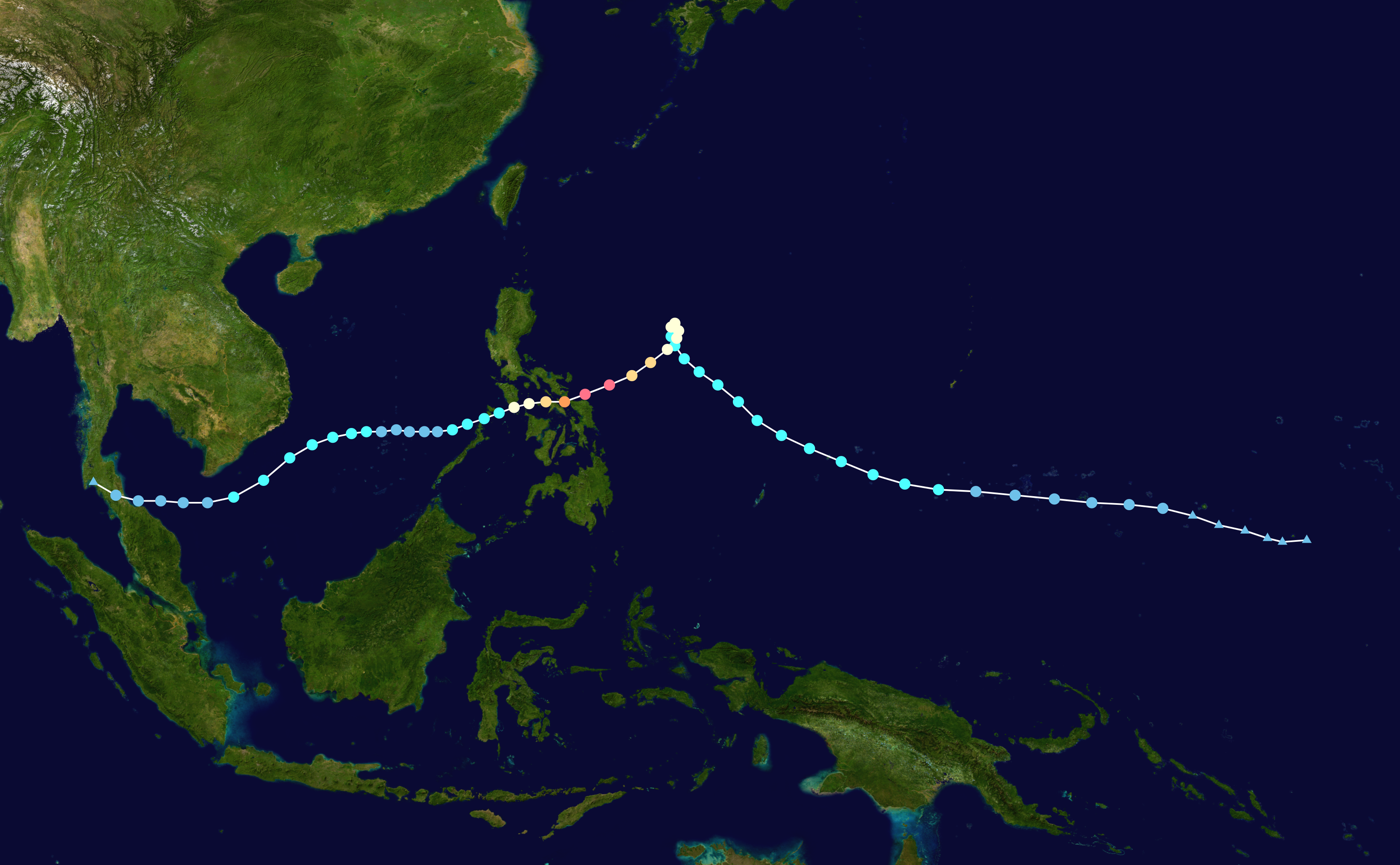
- Duration: December 3 – December 16
- Peak intensity: 140 km/h (85 mph) (10-min); 960 hPa (mbar)

Manny, like Lola, developed from the near-equatorial trough on December 1. It headed westward, slowly strengthening to a tropical storm on the 4th. Due to a ridge to the north, it looped on the 7th and 8th and became a typhoon on the way. While heading southwestward towards the Philippines, Manny rapidly intensified to a 135 mph (220 km/h) typhoon before hitting the Philippines late on the 9th. It weakened over the islands, and upper level winds kept it from restrengthening much over the South China Sea. Manny dissipated on the 16th over the Malay Peninsula, after causing 230 deaths, only one week after Lola hit the same area.

Manny's track was unusual, given its time of year with a loop and a strengthening period to the southwest. However, it has a near-perfect analog; Typhoon Pamela in the 1982 Pacific typhoon season took a nearly identical track within days of Manny (though Pamela was much weaker than Manny).

=== Tropical Depression Oning ===
- Tropical depression (PAGASA)
- Duration: December 14 – December 16
- Peak intensity: 55 km/h (35 mph) (10-min);

A non-tropical system developed from the ITCZ of where Manny formed on December 11. It moved in a fairly fast westward direction as it gradually intensified into a weak tropical depression late on December 14. The PAGASA issued warnings on the depression as it reached peak intensity late on December 15, making landfall over the islands of Visayas.

=== Severe Tropical Storm Nell (Puring) ===
- Severe tropical storm (JMA)
- Category 1 typhoon (SSHWS)
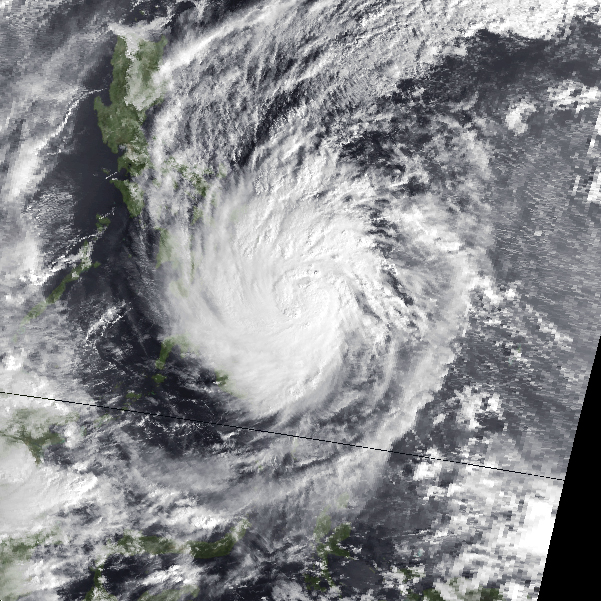
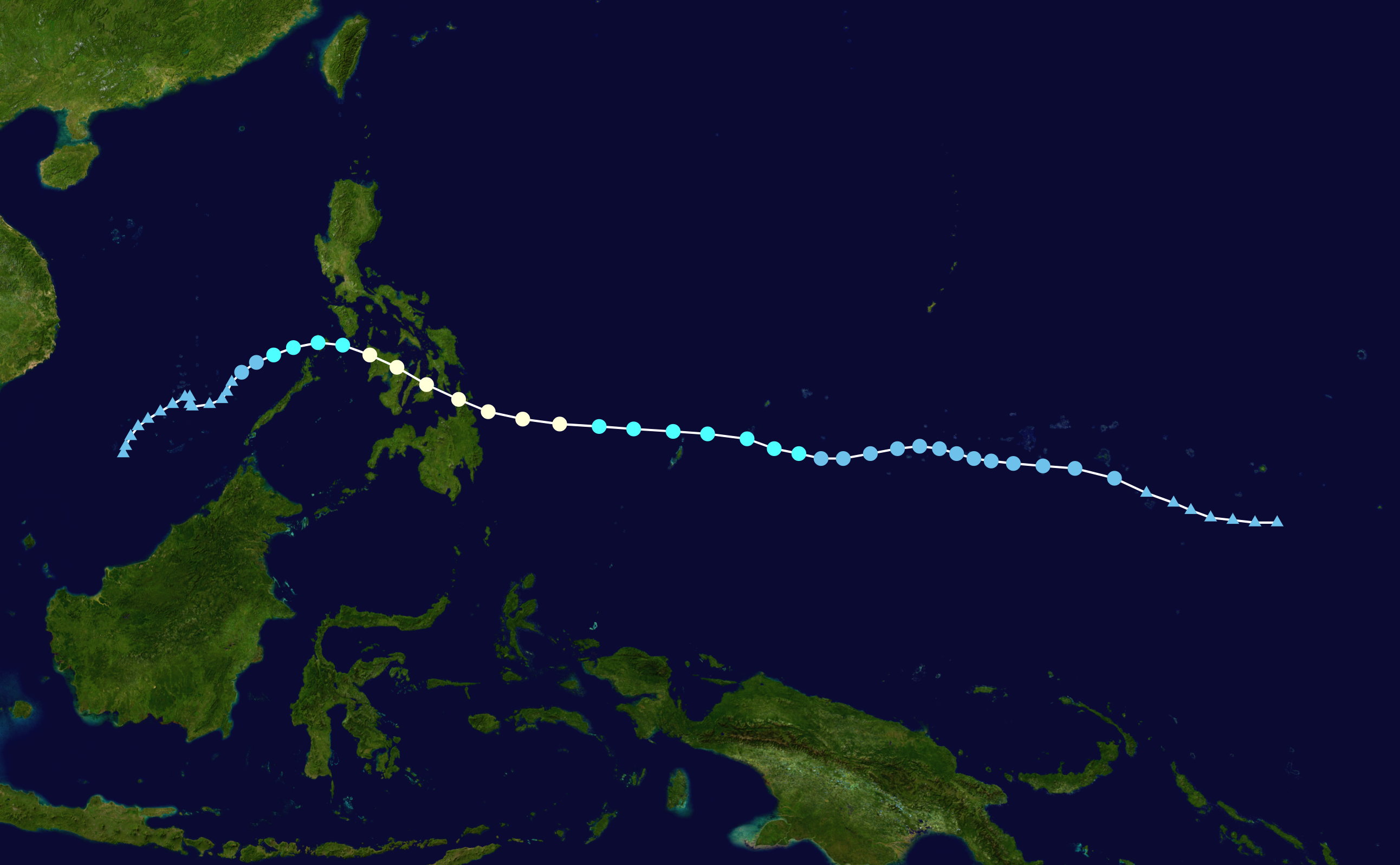
- Duration: December 20, 1993 – January 1, 1994
- Peak intensity: 110 km/h (70 mph) (10-min); 975 hPa (mbar)

Nell was the final system to hit the Philippines this year. 167 people were found dead due to Nell. Damages were estimated at US$105 million.

== Storm names ==
During the season 28 named tropical cyclones developed in the Western Pacific and were named by the Joint Typhoon Warning Center, when it was determined that they had become tropical storms. These names were contributed to a revised list which started on mid-1989.

Irma	Jack	Koryn	Lewis	Marian	Nathan	Ofelia	Percy	Robyn	Steve	Tasha	Vernon	Winona	Yancy	Zola
Abe	Becky	Cecil	Dot	Ed	Flo	Gene	Hattie	Ira	Jeana	Kyle	Lola	Manny	Nell	

=== Philippines ===
Atring	Bining	Kuring	Daling	Elang
Goring	Huling	Ibiang	Luming	Miling
Narsing	Openg	Pining	Rubing	Saling
Tasing	Unsing	Walding	Yeyeng	
Auxiliary list
Anding	Binang	Kadiang	Dinang	Epang
Gundang	Husing	Indang	Luring	Monang
Naning	Oning	Puring		

The Philippine Atmospheric, Geophysical and Astronomical Services Administration uses its own naming scheme for tropical cyclones in their area of responsibility. PAGASA assigns names to tropical depressions that form within their area of responsibility and any tropical cyclone that might move into their area of responsibility. Should the list of names for a given year prove to be insufficient, names are taken from an auxiliary list, the first 6 of which are published each year before the season starts. Names not retired from this list will be used again in the 1997 season. This is the same list used for the 1989 season. PAGASA uses its own naming scheme that starts in the Filipino alphabet, with names of Filipino female names ending with "ng" (A, B, K, D, etc.). Names that were not assigned/going to use are marked in gray.

==== Retirement ====
The name Monang was later retired.

== Season effects ==
This table summarizes all the systems that developed within or moved into the North Pacific Ocean, to the west of the International Date Line during 1993. The tables also provide an overview of a systems intensity, duration, land areas affected and any deaths or damages associated with the system.

Name	Dates	Peak intensity			Areas affected	Damage (USD)	Deaths	Ref(s).
Name	Dates	Category	Wind speed	Pressure	Areas affected	Damage (USD)	Deaths	Ref(s).
01W (Atring)	February 28 – March 1	Tropical depression	55 km/h (35 mph)	1010 hPa (29.83 inHg)	Philippines	None	None	
Irma	March 8 – 19	Severe tropical storm	95 km/h (60 mph)	985 hPa (29.09 inHg)	Marshall Islands, Caroline Islands	None	10	
03W (Bining)	April 9 – 13	Tropical depression	55 km/h (35 mph)	1002 hPa (29.59 inHg)	Caroline Islands, Philippines	None	None	
04W (Kuring)	April 19 – 26	Tropical depression	55 km/h (35 mph)	1008 hPa (29.77 inHg)	Caroline Islands, Philippines	None	None	
Daling	May 2 – 4	Tropical depression	45 km/h (30 mph)	1006 hPa (29.71 inHg)	Philippines	None	None	
Jack	May 16 – 22	Tropical depression	65 km/h (40 mph)	1008 hPa (29.77 inHg)	Caroline Islands, Mariana Islands	None	None	
Koryn (Goring)	June 16 – 29	Violent typhoon	195 km/h (120 mph)	905 hPa (27.02 inHg)	Caroline Islands, Philippines, China	$224 million	37	
07W (Elang)	June 17 – 20	Tropical depression	55 km/h (35 mph)	1008 hPa (29.77 inHg)	Philippines	None	None	
Lewis (Huling)	July 7 – 13	Severe tropical storm	95 km/h (60 mph)	985 hPa (29.09 inHg)	Philippines, South China, Vietnam	Unknown	19	
TD	July 13	Tropical depression	Not specified	1002 hPa (29.59 inHg)	South China	None	None	
Marian (Ibiang)	July 14 – 16	Tropical storm	75 km/h (45 mph)	1000 hPa (29.53 inHg)	None	None	None	
TD	July 17 – 22	Tropical depression	Not specified	1008 hPa (29.77 inHg)	None	None	None	
Nathan	July 19 – 25	Severe tropical storm	100 km/h (65 mph)	980 hPa (28.94 inHg)	Mariana Islands, Japan	$19.5 million	47	
TD	July 21	Tropical depression	Not specified	1008 hPa (29.77 inHg)	None	None	None	
Ofelia (Luming)	July 24 – 27	Tropical storm	85 km/h (50 mph)	990 hPa (29.23 inHg)	Japan	$197 million	13	
Percy (Miling)	July 27 – 30	Severe tropical storm	100 km/h (65 mph)	980 hPa (28.94 inHg)	Mariana Islands, Japan	$35.4 million	None	
Narsing	July 30 – 31	Tropical depression	55 km/h (35 mph)	1000 hPa (29.53 inHg)	None	None	None	
TD	July 31	Tropical depression	Not specified	1002 hPa (29.59 inHg)	Philippines, Taiwan	None	None	
Robyn (Openg)	August 1 – 11	Very strong typhoon	155 km/h (100 mph)	940 hPa (27.76 inHg)	Caroline Islands, Mariana Islands, Japan, South Korea	$178 million	45	
Steve (Pining)	August 6 – 14	Severe tropical storm	100 km/h (65 mph)	980 hPa (28.94 inHg)	Mariana Islands, Ryukyu Islands	None	None	
15W	August 13 – 14	Tropical depression	45 km/h (30 mph)	1002 hPa (29.59 inHg)	Marshall Islands	None	None	
Tasha (Rubing)	August 15 – 22	Typhoon	120 km/h (75 mph)	970 hPa (28.79 inHg)	Philippines, China	$88.9 million	1	
Keoni	August 19 – September 3	Very strong typhoon	165 km/h (105 mph)	940 hPa (27.76 inHg)	None	None	None	
Vernon	August 21 – 28	Typhoon	130 km/h (85 mph)	960 hPa (28.35 inHg)	Japan	Unknown	2	
Winona (Saling)	August 22 – 29	Tropical storm	75 km/h (45 mph)	990 hPa (29.23 inHg)	Philippines, Vietnam	Unknown	Unknown	
TD	August 23 – 25	Tropical depression	Not specified	1002 hPa (29.59 inHg)	Mariana Islands	None	None	
Yancy (Tasing)	August 29 – September 4	Very strong typhoon	175 km/h (100 mph)	925 hPa (27.32 inHg)	Japan	$1.67 billion	48	
Zola (Unsing)	September 5 – 9	Severe tropical storm	95 km/h (60 mph)	985 hPa (29.09 inHg)	Japan	None	None	
TD	September 7 – 8	Tropical depression	Not specified	1006 hPa (29.71 inHg)	Philippines	None	None	
Abe (Walding)	September 9 – 15	Very strong typhoon	155 km/h (100 mph)	945 hPa (27.76 inHg)	Philippines, Taiwan, China	$288 million	13	
Becky (Yeyeng)	September 13 – 18	Typhoon	120 km/h (75 mph)	980 hPa (28.94 inHg)	Philippines, South China	$260 million	8	
Dot (Anding)	September 20 – 27	Typhoon	130 km/h (85 mph)	965 hPa (28.65 inHg)	Philippines, China	$233 million	2	
Cecil	September 23 – 27	Typhoon	150 km/h (90 mph)	940 hPa (27.76 inHg)	Mariana Islands	None	None	
Binang	September 25	Tropical depression	Not specified	1004 hPa (29.65 inHg)	None	None	None	
Ed (Dinang)	September 30 – October 8	Very strong typhoon	185 km/h (115 mph)	915 hPa (27.32 inHg)	Caroline Islands, Mariana Islands	None	None	
Flo (Kadiang)	October 1 – 8	Very strong typhoon	185 km/h (115 mph)	915 hPa (27.32 inHg)	Philippines, Ryukyu Islands	$188 million	576	
28W (Epang)	October 6 – 13	Tropical depression	45 km/h (30 mph)	1002 hPa (29.59 inHg)	Philippines, South China	None	None	
Gene (Gundang)	October 7 – 10	Tropical storm	65 km/h (40 mph)	998 hPa (29.47 inHg)	Caroline Islands	None	None	
Hattie	October 19 – 25	Severe tropical storm	95 km/h (60 mph)	980 hPa (28.94 inHg)	Marshall Islands	None	None	
TD	October 22	Tropical depression	Not specified	992 hPa (29.29 inHg)	None	None	None	
Ira (Husing)	October 27 – November 5	Typhoon	150 km/h (90 mph)	950 hPa (28.05 inHg)	Caroline Islands, Mariana Islands, Philippines, China	$76 million	21	
Jeana	November 5 – 10	Tropical storm	85 km/h (50 mph)	992 hPa (29.29 inHg)	Caroline Islands	None	None	
Indang	November 12 – 13	Tropical depression	45 km/h (30 mph)	1008 hPa (29.77 inHg)	Philippines	None	None	
32W	November 13 – 16	Tropical depression	45 km/h (30 mph)	1002 hPa (29.59 inHg)	Caroline Islands	None	None	
33W	November 17 – 19	Tropical depression	45 km/h (30 mph)	1002 hPa (29.59 inHg)	Marshall Islands	None	None	
Kyle (Luring)	November 17 – 24	Typhoon	130 km/h (80 mph)	960 hPa (28.35 inHg)	Philippines, Vietnam, Cambodia	$1.5 million	110	
Lola (Monang)	December 1 – 9	Typhoon	150 km/h (90 mph)	955 hPa (28.20 inHg)	Caroline Islands, Philippines, Vietnam, Cambodia	$261 million	370	
Manny (Naning)	December 3 – 16	Typhoon	140 km/h (85 mph)	955 hPa (28.20 inHg)	Philippines, Vietnam, Thailand	$50 million	245	
Oning	December 14 – 16	Tropical depression	55 km/h (35 mph)	1004 hPa (29.65 inHg)	Philippines	None	None	
Nell (Puring)	December 21, 1993 – January 1, 1994	Severe tropical storm	110 km/h (70 mph)	975 hPa (28.79 inHg)	Philippines	$105 million	167	
Season aggregates
50 systems	February 28, 1993 – January 1, 1994		195 km/h (120 mph)	905 hPa (27.02 inHg)		>$3.78 billion	1,743	

== See also ==
- List of Pacific typhoon seasons
- 1993 Pacific hurricane season
- 1993 Atlantic hurricane season
- 1993 North Indian Ocean cyclone season
- South-West Indian Ocean cyclone season: 1992–93, 1993–94
- Australian region cyclone season: 1992–93, 1993–94
- South Pacific cyclone season: 1992–93, 1993–94
