= List of named storms (P) =

Storms are named for historical reasons to avoid confusion when communicating with the public, as more than one storm can exist at a time. Names are drawn in order from predetermined lists. For tropical cyclones, names are assigned when a system has one-, three-, or ten-minute winds of more than 65 km/h (40 mph). Standards, however, vary from basin to basin. For example, some tropical depressions are named in the Western Pacific, while within the Australian and Southern Pacific regions, the naming of tropical cyclones are delayed until they have gale-force winds occurring more than halfway around the storm center.

This list covers the letter P.

== Storms ==
Note: † indicates the name was retired after that usage in the respective basin

- Pabling (2001) – a weak tropical depression that persisted in the South China Sea.
- Pablo

- 1995 – did not affect land.
- 2004 – a tropical depression that was only recognized by PAGASA.
- 2008 – affected the Philippines as a weak tropical storm.
- 2012† – very intense typhoon that struck Mindanao, Philippines.
- 2019 – a Category 1 hurricane that became the easternmost Atlantic hurricane on record.

- Pabuk

- 2001 – struck Japan.
- 2007 – struck Taiwan and China.
- 2013 – a Category 2-equivalent typhoon that churned in the ocean.
- 2019 – a weak storm that made landfall in the Malay Peninsula.
- 2024 – a weak tropical storm that formed near Brunei and Malaysia.

- Paddy

- 1981 – a weak tropical cyclone that had no impact on land.
- 2021 – remained out to sea.

- Paeng

- 2006 – made landfall over the Philippines after its peak strength as a category 5 typhoon.
- 2014 – a typhoon that became a Category 5 super typhoon, but did not make landfall.
- 2018 – another Category 5 super typhoon that later made landfall in Japan as a weaker system.
- 2022† – a deadly tropical cyclone that caused widespread damage across the Philippines and later impacted Hong Kong and Macau.

- Page

- 1990 – a Category 5 super typhoon that became the fourth typhoon to strike Japan in three months.
- 1994 – a Category 2 typhoon that stayed out to sea and was difficult to track, having the largest track error of any typhoon in 1994.

- Paine

- 1986 – a Category 2 hurricane that contributed to one of the most significant flooding events in Oklahoma history.
- 1992 – minimal hurricane that stayed away from any land.
- 2016 – minimal hurricane that affected Baja California.
- 2022 – a weak tropical storm, dissipated in the open ocean.

- Paka (1997)† – originated in the Central Pacific and became a Category 5 super typhoon, affecting the Pacific islands, bringing total damages of up to US$580 million.
- Pakhar

- 2012 – a strong tropical storm that affected the Philippines and the Indochina as a whole in early-April 2012.
- 2017 – a strong tropical storm that impacted South China during late August 2017.
- 2022 – remained out at sea but caused 8 indirect deaths in the Philippines.

- Pali (2016) – earliest forming tropical cyclone in the East or Central Pacific after forming on January 7, became a Category 2 hurricane.
- Paloma (2008)† – sixth most intense November Atlantic hurricane on record; affected Cuba causing about US$450 million in damages.
- Pam

- 1974 – a Category 4 severe tropical cyclone that affected the northeastern coast of Australia.
- 1997 – a Category 2 tropical cyclone that affected the Cook Islands.
- 2015† – a Category 5 severe tropical cyclone that caused significant damage in Vanuatu and also affected the Solomon Islands, Tuvalu, and New Zealand.

- Pamela

- 1954 – Category 5 typhoon in the South China Sea that affected South China.
- 1958 – did not affect any land.
- 1961 – a Category 5 typhoon that crossed the island and the Taiwan Strait, the storm hit east China.
- 1964 – did not affect any land.
- 1966 –a category 2 typhoon made two landfalls with typhoon strength over Masbate and Mindoro before emerging from the South China Sea as a tropical storm.
- 1970 – brought rains and winds to the Philippines, but no major damage was reported.
- 1972 – a category 3 typhoon struck Philippines and Hong Kong killing one person.
- 1976 – a powerful typhoon that struck the U.S. territory of Guam in May 1976, causing about $500 million in damage (USD).
- 1979 – remained out to sea.
- 1982 – a Category 3 typhoon threatened Guam six years after the devastating typhoon of the same name.
- 2021 – a storm that made landfall in Mexico as a category 1 hurricane.

- Pancho

- 1986 – a short-lived tropical cyclone that persisted off the coast of Western Australia.
- 1997 – a severe tropical cyclone that meandered in the Indian Ocean.
- 2008 – affected Southwestern Australia bringing rainfall.

- Paolo

- 2013 – PAGASA name for Typhoon Wutip which impacted Vietnam as a Category 3 typhoon.
- 2017 – PAGASA name for Typhoon Lan, a large intense typhoon that impacted Japan.
- 2025 – a Category 2 typhoon that made landfall in the Philippines and South China.

- Paring

- 1968 – a Category 4 typhoon that did not affect land.
- 1972 – the most destructive tropical cyclone to strike Japan during the 1992.
- 1976 – a weak tropical storm that made landfall Northern Philippines and Hong Kong.
- 1980 – a tropical depression that affected Philippines, South China and Vietnam.
- 1984 – a weak tropical depression that persisted near the Philippines.
- 1988 – a Category 5 super typhoon that did not affect any land.
- 1992 – a severe tropical storm intensified over the South China Sea before making landfall in Vietnam.
- 1996 – a Category 3 equivalent typhoon that crossed the Ryukyu Islands.
- 2000 – a Category 3 typhoon executed a cyclonic loop near the Ryukyu Islands dissipated near Taiwan.

- Parma

- 2003 – a Category 4 super typhoon that did not affect any land.
- 2009† – a Category 4 typhoon that impacted northern Philippines and South China; same storm as Typhoon Pepeng of 2009 below.

- Pasing

- 1974 – a Category 1 typhoon that made landfall Japan.
- 1978 – a weak tropical storm that made landfall Vietnam.
- 1982 – s strong tropical storm significant flooding caused the evacuation of several thousand people and damaged the rice crop.
- 1986 – a Category 1 typhoon that made landfall Philippines and South China.
- 1990 – the fifth tropical cyclone of a record-six to hit Japan during the 1990.
- 1994 – a weak tropical storm that made landfall Taiwan and China.

- Pat

- 1948 – a typhoon that did not affect land.
- 1951 – a Category 2 typhoon that made landfall on the Philippines and China.
- 1977 – a weak and short-lived tropical cyclone.
- 1982 – a Category 3 typhoon that neared the Philippines.
- 1985 – impacted southern Japan and was known as one of three cyclones that interacted with each other.
- 1988 – a severe tropical storm that hit the Philippines.
- 1991 – a Category 4 typhoon that did not affect land.
- 1994 – a Category 2 typhoon that did not affect land.
- 2010† – a Category 3 severe tropical cyclone that affected the Cook Islands.

- Patricia

- 1949 – a category 4 typhoon that did not affect any land.
- 1970 – remained in the open ocean.
- 1974 – caused no known damage or deaths.
- 2003 – remained at sea, causing no damages.
- 2009 – briefly affected parts of Baja California Sur, causing no damage.
- 2015† – strongest storm ever recorded in the Western Hemisphere, the second-strongest worldwide in terms of pressure, and the strongest in terms of 1-minute sustained winds.

- Patsy

- 1955 – Category 4 super typhoon, struck the Philippines as a tropical storm.
- 1959 – Category 5 hurricane and Category 4-equivalent typhoon, crossed the International Dateline twice.
- 1962 – struck Samar, in the Philippines, and China.
- 1965 – struck the Philippines.
- 1967– struck China and North Vietnam.
- 1970 – Category 4 super typhoon, struck the Philippines and North Vietnam.
- 1973 – Category 5-equivalent super typhoon, brushed the Philippines.
- 1977 – remained out at sea.
- 1986 – a Category 2 tropical cyclone that affected Vanuatu and New Caledonia but caused little or no damage to the island nation.

- Patty

- 2012 – weak and short-lived tropical storm that formed near The Bahamas without affecting land.
- 2024 – a tropical storm that affected the Azores as a subtropical cyclone

- Paul

- 1978 – made landfall in western Mexico.
- 1980 – affected much of Queensland.
- 1982 – killed over 1,000 in Central America.
- 1994 – never threatened land.
- 1999 – a disorganized tropical storm.
- 2000 (April) – a severe tropical cyclone that did not affect any land.
- 2000 (October) – made landfall in Hawaii as a tropical depression.
- 2006 – made landfall in Mexico as a tropical depression.
- 2010 – a tropical cyclone that brought flooding in Northern Territory of Australia.
- 2012 – threatened Baja California, but weakened before landfall.
- 2018 – never threatened land.
- 2024 – a Category 2 tropical cyclone that remained away from land in the Coral sea.

- Paula

- 1973 – a weak cyclone that did not impact land.
- 2001† – caused extensive damage to areas of Vanuatu.
- 2010 – a small hurricane that struck Honduras and Cuba, causing minimal damage.

- Paulette (2020) – a long-lasting Category 2 hurricane that impacted Bermuda.
- Pauline

- 1947 – a Category 3 typhoon that battered northern Philippines.
- 1961 – remained well out at sea.
- 1968 – made landfall on Baja California.
- 1985 – threatened Hawaii.
- 1997† – was one of the deadliest Pacific hurricanes to make landfall in Mexico, killing more than 200 people.

- Pawan (2019) – a relatively weak cyclonic storm that made landfall in Somalia.
- Pearl

- 1948 – a Category 2 typhoon that made landfall Eastern China and Korea.
- 1983 – a tropical low that was classified as a tropical cyclone during the season.
- 1994 – a severe tropical cyclone that had no impacts on land which later crossed over to the South-West Indian Ocean.

- Pedring (2011)† – a strong Category 4 typhoon that ravaged the Philippines.
- Pedro (1989)† – a Category 2 tropical cyclone that stayed at sea.
- Peggy

- 1945 – a weak tropical storm which did not make landfall.
- 1965 – not areas land.
- 1986 – a Category 5 super typhoon that later made landfall on Luzon and China, killing at least 422 people.
- 1989 – a weak tropical storm which did not impact land.

- Peilou (2026) – a tropical storm that did not affect land.
- Peipah

- 2007 – affected the Philippines and Vietnam as a minimal typhoon during November.
- 2014 – a weak tropical storm that did not affect any land.
- 2019 – a weak tropical storm that did not affect any land.
- 2025 – a weak tropical storm that brushed the southern and eastern coasts of Japan.

- Peke (1987) – a Category 2 hurricane that persisted in both the Central and Northwest Pacific basins.
- Pena (2026) – a tropical storm that stayed away from any land.
- Penha (2026) – weak tropical storm that made landfall in the Southern Philippines.
- Peni

- 1980 – a Category 3 severe tropical cyclone that affected Fiji.
- 1990† – a severe tropical cyclone that did not affect any land.

- Penny

- 1974 – a November Category 2 tropical cyclone; did not affect any land.
- 1998 – a severe tropical storm that affected Philippines.
- 2018 – a Category 2 tropical cyclone that affected northern Australia.

- Pepang

- 1963 – remained over the open ocean.
- 1967 – a Category 1 typhoon that affected Philippines and South China.
- 1971 – a strong typhoon affected Philippines, South China and Vietnam.
- 1975 – hit the Philippines and Vietnam
- 1979 – crossed southern Luzon and then made landfall near Hong Kong.
- 1983 – a strong tropical storm that affected Philippines and South China.
- 1987 – responsible for severe flooding in Taiwan
- 1991 – short-lived storm that brushed Japan
- 1995 – a Category 4 typhoon that crossed the central Philippines and then made landfall on eastern Vietnam, causing 110 deaths
- 1999 – a Category 3 typhoon that hit northern Luzon then eastern China

- Pepeng

- 2005 – a severe tropical storm that brushed the northeastern tip of the Philippines.
- 2009† – a Category 4 typhoon that impacted northern Philippines and South China; same storm as Typhoon Parma of 2009 above.

- Pepito

- 2020 – a typhoon that affected the Philippines, Vietnam and Southern China.
- 2024† – a Category 5 super typhoon that made landfall in Aurora and Catanduanes.

- Percy

- 1980 – a Category 4 typhoon that impacted Taiwan.
- 1983 – persisted in the South China Sea.
- 1987 – affected the Caroline Islands.
- 1990 – impacted northern Philippines and eastern China.
- 1993 – impacted Japan as a severe tropical storm.
- 2005† – a Category 5 severe tropical cyclone that did not affect any land.

- Perla (2019) – a small Category 2 typhoon that did not affect any land.
- Peta (2013) – a weak tropical cyclone that made landfall in northern Western Australia.
- Pete (1999) – a weak Category 2 tropical cyclone that crossed from the Australian region to the South Pacific and did not impact land.
- Peter

- 1978 – the wettest tropical cyclone on record in Australia; caused damages throughout the Gulf of Carpentaria.
- 1997 – a Category 1 typhoon that made landfall in Japan.
- 2003 – a strong tropical storm that formed out of an extratropical gale in December, almost reaching hurricane status in the open ocean.
- 2021 – a weak and poorly organized tropical storm that stayed at sea.

- Petie (1950) – remained out to sea.
- Pewa (2013) – a severe tropical storm that persisted in both the Central and Northwestern Pacific basins.
- Phailin (2013) – was the most intense tropical cyclone to make landfall in India; damages were totalled to US$4.26 billion.
- Phanfone

- 2002 – a Category 4 typhoon that minimal affected Japan.
- 2008 – was only recognized by the Japan Meteorological Agency as a severe tropical storm.
- 2014 – a Category 4 super typhoon that made landfall in Japan.
- 2019† – a Category 3 typhoon that struck the Philippines on Christmas, killing over 50.

- Phet (2010) – a powerful tropical cyclone that made landfall on Oman, Western India, and Pakistan, killing 861 people.
- Phethai (2018) – affected the Andhra Pradesh region in December 2018.
- Phil (1996) – a long-lasting Category 2 tropical cyclone that affected Northern Australia before moving out into the Indian Ocean
- Philippe

- 2005 – a short-lived Category 1 hurricane that stayed out in Atlantic Ocean.
- 2011 – a Category 1 hurricane that never impacted any land.
- 2017 – a short-lived and weak tropical storm which affected Cuba and South Florida.
- 2023 – a long-lived storm that affected the northern Leeward Islands and Bermuda, then made landfall in Maine as an extra-tropical cyclone.

- Phoebe (2004) – a weak offseason crossover cyclone from the South-West Indian Ocean to the Australian region that did not threaten land.
- Phyan (2009) – a cyclonic storm that made landfall on India and brought heavy rains.
- Phyllis

- 1953 – a Category 1 typhoon that made landfall Taiwan and China.
- 1958 – a Category 5 super typhoon that remained over open waters.
- 1960 – remained over open waters.
- 1963 a Category 1 typhoon that affected Philippines.
- 1966 – had minor effects during the Vietnam War, briefly limiting the number of bombing raids conducted by the United States due to squally weather.
- 1969 – remained over open waters.
- 1972 – a Category 4 typhoon struck southeastern Japan.
- 1975 – was one of seven tropical cyclones in 1975 to pass within range of the Japan Meteorological Agency's (JMA) radar surveillance.
- 1978 – remained over open waters.
- 1981 – a strong tropical storm that made landfall Northern Japan.
- 1984 – remained over open waters.
- 1987 – a Category 3 typhoon the affecting the Philippines three weeks after Typhoon Nina devastated the archipelago.

- Pierre

- 1985 – brushed the coast of Queensland.
- 2007 – an off-season tropical cyclone that impacted Papua New Guinea.

- Pilandok (2026) – a weak tropical storm that struck in Japan.
- Pilar

- 1987 – a weak and short-lived tropical storm that dissipated before affecting land.
- 2017 – minimal tropical storm that brushed the Mexican coastline with heavy rainfall.
- 2023 – moderate tropical storm that formed near Central America and then moved out to sea, caused heavy rainfall in El Salvador and in other neighboring countries.

- Pining

- 1965 – did a loop and only survived 5 days before dissipating.
- 1969 – remained over open waters.
- 1977 – a strong but short-lived tropical storm which struck Hong Kong.
- 1981 – a Category 2 typhoon that caused severe flooding in South Korea.
- 1985 – a Category 2 Typhoon that caused minor damages in Japan, Taiwan and South Korea.
- 1989 – a strong tropical storm that caused widespread flooding throughout Eastern China.
- 1993 – remained over open waters.
- 1997 – a weak tropical storm brought locally heavy rainfall to areas of northern Luzon, resulting in minor flooding.

- Piper (1996) – did not threaten or impact land.
- Pita (2025) – a Category 1 tropical cyclone that caused flooding in Fiji and Samoa.
- Pitang

- 1966 – a Category 4 super typhoon that produced heavy rain over Taiwan.
- 1970† – a Category 5 super typhoon that made landfall on Luzon at peak intensity.

- Podul

- 2001 – a super typhoon that did not affect land.
- 2007 – a short-lived severe tropical storm only recognized by the JMA.
- 2013 – a weak tropical storm that affected the Philippines and Vietnam.
- 2019 – a disorganized tropical storm that affected the Philippines.
- 2025 – a Category 2 typhoon that struck Southern Taiwan and Fujian, China.

- Pogi (2003)† – PAGASA name for Typhoon Maemi, which heavily impacted South Korea.
- Pola (2019)† – a severe tropical cyclone that affected Tonga.
- Polly

- 1952 – a Category 1 typhoon that did not affect land.
- 1956 – made landfall in Philippines as a category 2 typhoon.
- 1960 – a Category 4 typhoon that made landfall Eastern China.
- 1963 – a Category 1 typhoon that impacts were caused primarily by heavy rainfall.
- 1965 – a weak tropical storm that made landfall Vietnam.
- 1968 a weak tropical storm dropped heavy rains on the southern islands of Japan.
- 1971 (January) – formed in the Indian Ocean west of the Keeling Islands.
- 1971 (August) – a tropical storm that made landfall Korea Peninsula.
- 1974 – a Category 2 typhoon that made landfall Japan.
- 1978 – a weak tropical storm that affected southern Japan.
- 1992 – triggered devastating floods across Fujian and Zhejiang Provinces in China.
- 1993† – developed in the Australian region of the Coral Sea, crossed into the South Pacific.
- 1995 – brushed Luzon before curving out to sea.

- Polo

- 1984 – a Category 3 hurricane that struck southern Baja California as a tropical depression.
- 1990 – a low-end Category 1 hurricane that remained at sea.
- 2008 – a tropical storm that did not threaten land.
- 2014 – a Category 1 hurricane that paralleled the Mexican coastline but did not make landfall.
- 2020 – a weak november tropical storm that remained at sea.
- 2026 – a Category 5 hurricane that impacted Baja California Sur as a Category 2; second-most intense Pacific hurricane by central pressure.

- Pongsona (2002)† – a Category 4 typhoon that caused over US$730 million of damage in Guam and the Northern Mariana Islands.
- Potira (2021) – a rare South Atlantic subtropical storm.
- Prapiroon

- 2000 – affected the Ryukyu Islands and Korean Peninsula.
- 2006 – affected China.
- 2012 – a Category 3 typhoon that meandered in the Philippine Sea.
- 2018 – a minimal typhoon that brought torrential rainfall towards the Korean Peninsula.
- 2024 – a severe tropical storm that made landfall in Hainan and Vietnam.

- Prema

- 1983 – did not affect any land.
- 1993† – was among the worst tropical cyclones to hit Vanuatu.

- Priscilla

- 1946 – a Category 3 typhoon that went out to sea.
- 1967 – a hurricane that did not impact land.
- 1970 – a very weak and short-lived tropical cyclone.
- 1971 – a Category 3 hurricane which made landfall on Mexico as a tropical storm.
- 1975 – a tropical storm that did not impact land.
- 1983 – a Category 3 hurricane which impacted the Southwestern United States despite not making landfall.
- 1989 – a tropical storm that did not impact land.
- 2013 – a weak tropical storm that had no impact on land.
- 2019 – a weak tropical storm that made landfall on Mexico quickly after forming.
- 2025 – a large Category 3 hurricane that affected several Mexican states while it passed near the coastline.

- Prudence (1964) – a strong tropical storm that did not threaten land.
- Pulasan (2024) – a strong tropical storm that affected East China, Japan, South Korea and the Philippines.
- Pyarr (2005) – a cyclonic storm that affected eastern India and Bangladesh, killing 84 people.

== See also ==
- Tropical cyclone
- Tropical cyclone naming
- European windstorm names
- Atlantic hurricane season
- List of Pacific hurricane seasons
- South Atlantic tropical cyclone
