= List of storms named Pam =

The name Pam has been used for three tropical cyclones in the South Pacific Ocean.

- Cyclone Pam (1974) – a Category 4 severe tropical cyclone that affected the northeastern coast of Australia.
- Cyclone Pam (1997) – a Category 2 tropical cyclone that affected the Cook Islands.
- Cyclone Pam (2015) – a Category 5 severe tropical cyclone that caused significant damage in Vanuatu and also affected the Solomon Islands, Tuvalu, and New Zealand.
