= List of storms named Peni =

The name Peni has been used for two tropical cyclones in the South Pacific region of the Southern Hemisphere:

- Cyclone Peni (1980) – a Category 3 severe tropical cyclone that affected Fiji.
- Cyclone Peni (1990) – a Category 3 severe tropical cyclone that did not affect any land.
