= List of storms named Pitang =

The name Pitang was used for two tropical cyclones by the Philippine Weather Bureau, the predecessor of the modern-day Philippine Atmospheric, Geophysical and Astronomical Services Administration (PAGASA), in the Western Pacific Ocean:

- Typhoon Elsie (1966) (T6619, 22W, Pitang) – a Category 4 super typhoon that produced heavy rain over Taiwan.
- Typhoon Georgia (1970) (T7015, 17W, Pitang) – a Category 5 super typhoon that made landfall on Luzon at peak intensity.

The name Pitang was retired after the 1970 season, and was replaced by Pasing in 1974.
