= Tropical Storm Ofelia =

Pacific tropical storm in 1993

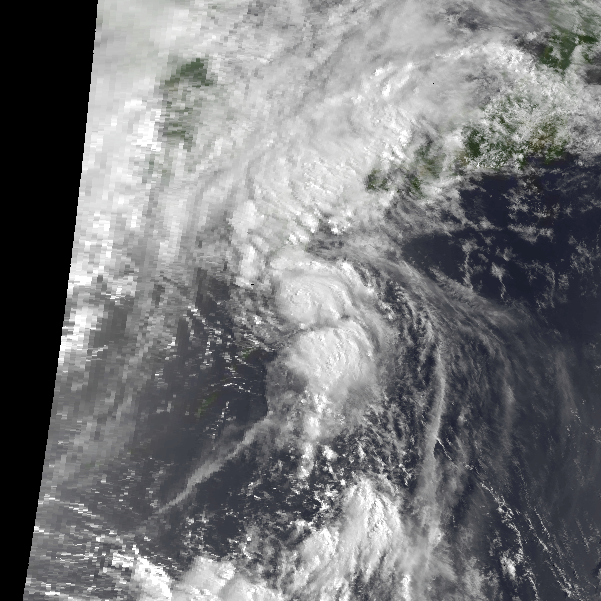
- Tropical Storm Ofelia at peak intensity late on July 26, 1993

Meteorological history
- Formed: July 24, 1993
- Dissipated: July 27, 1993

Tropical storm
- 10-minute sustained (JMA)
- Highest winds: 85 km/h (50 mph)
- Lowest pressure: 990 hPa (mbar); 29.23 inHg

Tropical storm
- 1-minute sustained (SSHWS/JTWC)
- Highest winds: 85 km/h (50 mph)
- Lowest pressure: 991 hPa (mbar); 29.26 inHg

Overall effects
- Fatalities: 13
- Damage: $197 million (1993 USD)
- Areas affected: Japan
- Part of the 1993 Pacific typhoon season

Tropical Storm Ofelia, known in the Philippines as Tropical Storm Luming, was an early-season tropical cyclone that passed south Japan during July 1993. An area of disturbed weather developed from the Western Pacific monsoon trough in late July 1993. The disturbance organized into a tropical depression on July 24, and the next day developed into a tropical storm. Tracking west-northwestward, Ofelia slowly deepened and attained its peak intensity of 80 km/h (50 mph) and a minimum barometric pressure of 994 mbar (29.4 inHg) at noon on July 26. On the next day, the storm made landfall shortly before weakening to a tropical depression. On July 27, Ofelia transitioned into an extratropical cyclone.

Across Tokushima Prefecture, 3 people were killed and 44 homes were damaged while 25 other homes were destroyed. Elsewhere, across Kochi Prefecture, 142 homes were damaged and an additional 452 were destroyed. Three people were also killed and another was injured. The storm dropped heavy rains in Ehime Prefecture for a 36-hour period, resulting in 17 landslides and the cancellation of 16 flights. Throughout the prefecture, 119 houses were damaged and 10 others were destroyed. In Oita Prefecture, a landslide destroyed a home in Honyabakei, killing three. In Hiroshima Prefecture, 18,060 households lost power after 934 power lines were downed while 713 homes were damaged and 54 were destroyed. A total of 22 railtracks and 1,165 roads were damaged. Three people were also hurt. In Yamaguchi Prefecture, four people were killed. Moreover, 1,312 homes were damaged and 84 others were destroyed. Overall, 13 people were killed and damage was estimated at 21.9 billion yen (US$197 million). (Note: All currencies are converted from Japanese yen to United States Dollars using this with an exchange rate of the year 1992.) (Note: All damage totals are in 1992 values of their respective currencies.)

== Meteorological history ==
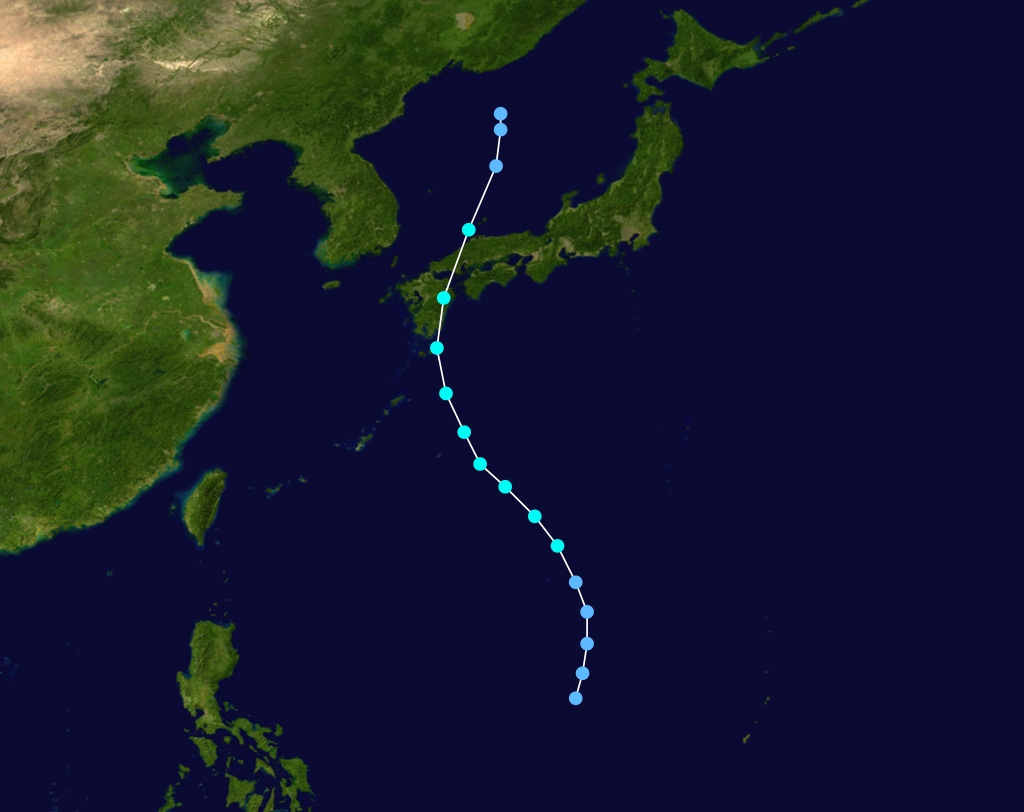
Map plotting the storm's track and intensity, according to the Saffir–Simpson scale Map key Saffir–Simpson scale Tropical depression (≤38 mph, ≤62 km/h) Tropical storm (39–73 mph, 63–118 km/h) Category 1 (74–95 mph, 119–153 km/h) Category 2 (96–110 mph, 154–177 km/h) Category 3 (111–129 mph, 178–208 km/h) Category 4 (130–156 mph, 209–251 km/h) Category 5 (≥157 mph, ≥252 km/h) Unknown Storm type Tropical cyclone Subtropical cyclone Extratropical cyclone, remnant low, tropical disturbance, or monsoon depression

Tropical Storm Ofelia originated from the Western Pacific monsoon trough during July 1993. At 06:00 UTC on July 24, the Joint Typhoon Warning Center (JTWC) started tracking a tropical disturbance, which the Japan Meteorological Agency classified as a tropical depression twelve hours later. (Note: The Japan Meteorological Agency is the official Regional Specialized Meteorological Center for the western Pacific Ocean.) (Note: Wind estimates from the JMA and most other basins throughout the world are sustained over 10 minutes, while estimates from the United States-based Joint Typhoon Warning Center are sustained over 1 minute. 10-minute winds are about 1.14 times the amount of 1-minute winds.) Around this time, the Philippine Atmospheric, Geophysical and Astronomical Services Administration (PAGASA) also monitored the storm and assigned it with the local name Luming. At 22:00 UTC, a Tropical Cyclone Formation Alert was issued based on satellite imagery that showed a well-organized system, although the low-level circulation remained exposed from the deep convection. Due to the sudden development of central dense overcast over the low-level circulation center, the JTWC issued its first warning on Tropical Storm Ofelia at 06:00 UTC on July 25, although post-season analysis from the JTWC indicated that Ofelia did not become a tropical storm until three hours later. The JMA followed suit that evening. Tracking west-northwestwards, Ofelia slowly intensified. Midday on July 26, the storm attained its peak intensity of 80 km/h (50 mph) and a minimum barometric pressure of 994 mbar (29.4 inHg). On the next day, the storm made landfall over Kyushu about 60 km (35 mi) east-southeast of Kagoshima at peak intensity. Overland, the storm weakened to a tropical depression later on July 27. After moving across southern Japan, Ofelia recurved northeastwards and became an extratropical cyclone over the Sea of Japan on July 28. The JTWC ceased tracking the system that morning, with the JTWC doing the same a day later.

== Impact ==
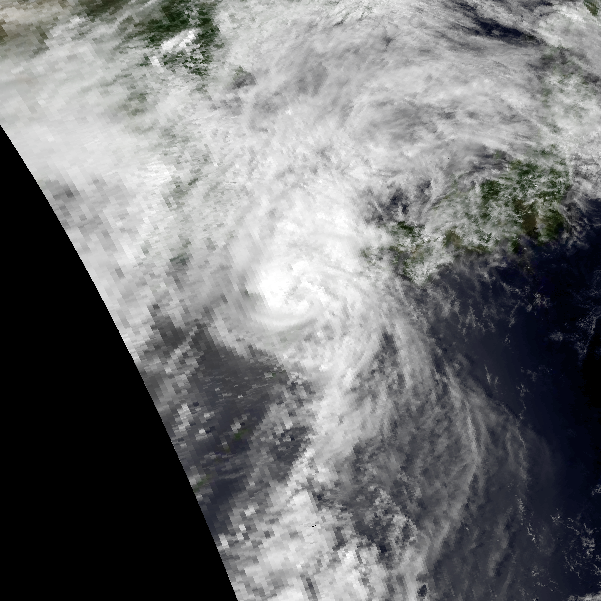
Ofelia over Japan on July 27

Under the anticipation of landfall over Kyushu, weather alerts were issued for Kyushu and western Honshu, where rains up to 150 mm (5 in) expected. The cyclone, in conjunction with Tropical Storm Nathan before it and Tropical Storm Percy after it, dropped heavy rainfall across southern portions of the Japanese archipelago across late July and early August 1993. A total of 1,282 mm (50.5 in) fell in Ebino; this was the highest rainfall recorded throughout the passage of the three systems combined. A peak hourly rainfall total of 82 mm (3.2 in) was observed by Lake Miike. Meanwhile, a peak daily precipitation total of 637 mm (25.1 in) fell in Asahimaru. A wind gust of 98 km/h (61 mph) was recorded in Kinugasayama. Nation-wide, damage amounted to 21.9 billion yen (US$197 million). Thirteen people were killed by Ofelia.

Across Tokushima Prefecture, 44 homes and 487 roads were damaged while 25 other homes were destroyed. A total of 2,309 ha (5,710 acres) of cops were damaged. Monetary damage there was assessed at 9.82 billion yen. Three people were killed in a landslide near Mount Tsurugi. Across Kochi Prefecture, 142 homes were damaged and an additional 452 were destroyed. Moreover, 622 roads were damaged. Heavy rains contributed to flooding that overflowed rivers in Kochi, Kagami, and Yusuhara, destroying some homes. Throughout the prefecture, three people were killed and another was injured. Two homes were damaged in Kagawa Prefecture. Ofelia dropped heavy rains across Ehime Prefecture for a 36-hour period, resulting in 17 landslides. As a result of the rainfall, 11 trains were delayed and 16 flights were cancelled. Throughout the prefecture, 119 houses were damaged and 10 others were destroyed. Damage totaled 2.87 billion, which was primarily from crops. Four homes were damaged and one was destroyed in Miyazaki Prefecture. Heavy rains from Ofelia, Percy, and Nathan caused Nagasaki City to have their wettest July on record. Three homes were damaged and another was destroyed in Nagasaki Prefecture.

In Oita Prefecture, a landslide triggered by the rain crushed a home in Honyabakei, burying an 87-year old, 57-year-old and 10-year-old. All of the buried were found, two of whom had already perished and another later died in a hospital. Throughout the prefecture, six roads were damaged and there were twenty landslides. Due to a combination of Ofelia and Percy, two homes were damaged in Osaka Prefecture. Twelve homes were damaged in Hyogo Prefecture. Damage in Okayama Prefecture amounted to 789 million yen. Across Hiroshima Prefecture, 18,060 households lost power after 934 power lines were downed while 713 homes were damaged and 54 were destroyed. A total of 22 railtracks and 1,165 roads were damaged. Three people were wounded, including two after a home collapsed. Damage in the prefecture amounted to 8.11 billion yen. Six trains and some road traffic was halted in Yamaguchi Prefecture, located on the western tip of the Honshu. There, four people were killed, including a middle school student who drowned in floodwaters and a 49-year-old that was initially rendered missing, and eight others sustained injuries, three of whom in a tent in Tokuyama. Moreover, 1,312 homes were damaged and 84 others were destroyed; most of the damage and destroyed homes occurred in Ube. Across Shimane Prefecture, 230 homes were damaged and crop damage was estimated at 307 million yen. Due to a combination of Ofelia and Percy, eight homes were damaged in Hokkaido Prefecture.

== See also ==
- Tropical Storm Winona (1990)
