= List of storms named Ramil =

The name Ramil has been used for four tropical cyclones in the Philippine Area of Responsibility by PAGASA in the Western Pacific Ocean. It replaced the unused name Roleta following the 2001 Pacific typhoon season.

- Typhoon Lupit (2009) (T0920, 22W, Ramil) – Powerful Category 5 super typhoon that stayed away from any landmass.
- Typhoon Danas (2013) (T1324, 23W, Ramil) – Category 4 typhoon, which struck the Ryukyu Islands and Japan.
- Typhoon Damrey (2017) (T1723, 28W, Ramil) – Deadly Category 2 typhoon that made landfall in Vietnam.
- Severe Tropical Storm Fengshen (2025) (T2524, 30W, Ramil) – A tropical storm that struck the Philippines and Vietnam.

| Preceded by Quedan | Pacific typhoon season names Ramil | Succeeded by Salome |
