= List of storms named Quedan =

The name Quedan has been used for five tropical cyclones in the Philippine Area of Responsibility by PAGASA in the Western Pacific Ocean.

- Tropical Storm Kajiki (2001) (T0124, 30W, Quedan) – struck the Philippines
- Tropical Depression Quedan (2005) (25W) – a tropical depression that was only recognized by PAGASA and JTWC
- Typhoon Melor (2009) (T0918, 20W, Quedan) – a powerful typhoon that hit Japan.
- Typhoon Fitow (2013) (T1323, 22W, Quedan) – the strongest typhoon to make landfall in mainland China during October
- Severe Tropical Storm Saola (2017) (T1722, 27W, Quedan) – a strong tropical storm which caused moderate damages in Japan despite not making landfall.
- Typhoon Nakri (2025) (T2523, 29W, Quedan) – a strong typhoon which passed near the coast of Japan.

Preceded by Paolo	Pacific typhoon season names Quedan	Succeeded by Ramil
