= List of storms named Page =

The name Page has been used to name two Tropical cyclones in the Western Pacific Ocean.

- Typhoon Page (1990) (T9024, 26W, Tering) – Category 5 equivalent typhoon, became the fourth typhoon to strike Japan within three months
- Typhoon Page (1994) (T9403, 03W, Klaring) – Category 2 equivalent typhoon that stayed out at sea, generated large waves and high tides in the western Mariana Islands
