= List of storms named Pauline =

The name Pauline was used for four tropical cyclones in the Eastern Pacific Ocean:

- Tropical Storm Pauline (1961), remained well out at sea
- Hurricane Pauline (1968), made landfall on Baja California
- Hurricane Pauline (1985), threatened Hawaii
- Hurricane Pauline (1997), a Category 4 hurricane that made landfall in Mexico, killing between 230 and 500 people, and causing 447.8 million (1997 USD) in damage.

Following the hurricane in 1997, the name Pauline was retired from use in the Eastern Pacific, and replaced with Patricia for the 2003 season.

The name Pauline has also been used for one tropical cyclone in the Western Pacific Ocean:

- Typhoon Pauline (1947)
