= List of storms named Prema =

The name Prema has been used to name two tropical cyclones in the South Pacific Ocean. The name is Hindi for Love.

- Cyclone Prema (1983) – A Category 1 tropical cyclone (Australian scale) that churned in the open ocean.
- Cyclone Prema (1993) – A Category 4 tropical cyclone (Australian scale) that caused $60 million (1994 US$) in damage.

Prema was retired from use in the South Pacific following the 1992–93 cyclone season and replaced with Pat.
