= List of storms named Percy =

The name Percy has been used to name six tropical cyclones: five in the West Pacific Ocean and one in the South Pacific Ocean.

In the West Pacific:

- Typhoon Percy (1980) (T8014, 19W) – A strong Category 4 typhoon that brushed southern Taiwan before weakening and striking southeastern mainland China
- Typhoon Percy (1983) (T8320, 21W, Yayang) – Category 1 typhoon that only had minor effects, primarily in the Philippines
- Tropical Storm Percy (1987) (T8702, 02W) – A weak and short-lived storm that never affected land
- Typhoon Percy (1990) (T9006, 07W) – Category 4 typhoon that crossed extreme northern Luzon as a Category 2 before hitting southeastern China as a weak Category 1 typhoon
- Typhoon Percy (1993) (T9306, 12W) – Weak typhoon that hit southwestern Japan

In the South Pacific:

- Cyclone Percy (2005) – powerful Category 5 cyclone that caused severe damage in the Cook Islands

== See also ==
- Cyclone Per (2007) – a European windstorm with a similar name
