= List of storms named Pasing =

The name Pasing was used for six tropical cyclones by the Philippine Atmospheric, Geophysical and Astronomical Services Administration (PAGASA) and its predecessor, the Philippine Weather Bureau, in the Western Pacific Ocean.

- Typhoon Shirley (1974) – a Category 1 typhoon that made landfall Japan.
- Tropical Storm Shirley (1978) – a weak tropical storm that made landfall Vietnam.
- Tropical Storm Hope (1982) – a strong tropical storm significant flooding caused the evacuation of several thousand people and damaged the rice crop.
- Typhoon Ellen (1986) (T8620, 17W, Pasing) – a Category 1 typhoon that made landfall Philippines and South China.
- Typhoon Hattie (1990) – the fifth tropical cyclone of a record-six to hit Japan during the 1990.
- Tropical Storm Caitlin (1994) – a weak tropical storm that made landfall Taiwan and China.
