= List of storms named Pilar =

The name Pilar has been used for three tropical cyclones in the Eastern Pacific Ocean.

- Tropical Storm Pilar (1987) – a weak and short-lived tropical storm that dissipated before affecting land
- Tropical Storm Pilar (2017) – minimal tropical storm that brushed the Mexican coastline with heavy rainfall
- Tropical Storm Pilar (2023) – moderate tropical storm that formed south of Guatemala and then moved out to sea, caused heavy rainfall in El Salvador and other parts of Central America
