= List of storms named Peggy =

The name Peggy has been used for three tropical cyclones in the Western Pacific Ocean:

- Tropical Storm Peggy (1945)
- Typhoon Peggy (1986)
- Tropical Storm Peggy (1989)

It has also been used for one tropical cyclone in the South-West Indian Ocean:

- Cyclone Peggy (1965)
