= List of storms named Paddy =

The name Paddy has been used for two tropical cyclones in the Australian region of the Southern Hemisphere:

- Cyclone Paddy (1981) – a weak tropical cyclone that had no impact on land.
- Cyclone Paddy (2021) – remained out to sea.
