= List of storms named Patty =

The name Patty has been used for two tropical cyclones in the Atlantic Ocean:

- Tropical Storm Patty (2012) – weak and short-lived tropical storm that formed near The Bahamas without affecting land
- Tropical Storm Patty (2024) – caused minor damage in the Azores as a subtropical storm
