= List of storms named Pepeng =

The name Pepeng was used for two tropical cyclones in the Philippine Area of Responsibility in the West Pacific Ocean. Pepeng replaced Pabling following the 2001 Pacific typhoon season:

- Tropical Storm Bolaven (2005) (T0523, 24W, Pepeng) – struck the northern Philippines.
- Typhoon Parma (2009; T0917, 19W, Pepeng) – a damaging Category 4 super typhoon that traversed the Northern Philippines, made landfall on the island of Hainan, China, and then in Vietnam.

The name Pepeng was retired after the 2009 season and replaced with Paolo.

== See also ==
- Storm Claudia (2025) – a European windstorm that was named Pepe by the Free University of Berlin.
