= Hurricane Pamela =

Category 1 Pacific hurricane in 2021

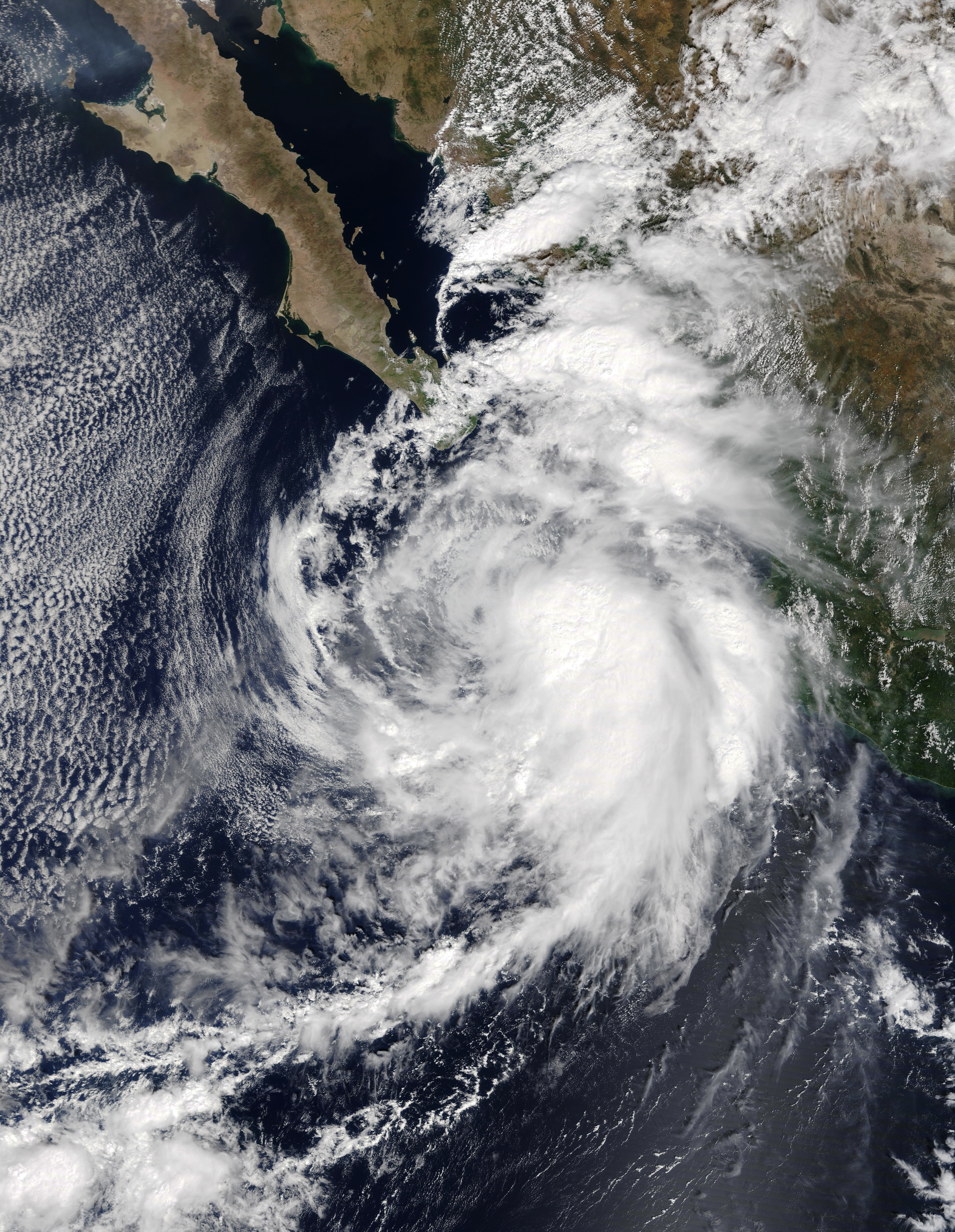
- Hurricane Pamela at peak intensity on October 12, 2021

Meteorological history
- Formed: October 10, 2021
- Dissipated: October 13, 2021

Category 1 hurricane
- 1-minute sustained (SSHWS/NWS)
- Highest winds: 75 mph (120 km/h)
- Lowest pressure: 987 mbar (hPa); 29.15 inHg

Overall effects
- Fatalities: 3 total
- Missing: 4
- Damage: $94.4 million (2021 USD)
- Areas affected: Northwestern and Western Mexico, Southern United States
- IBTrACS
- Part of the 2021 Pacific hurricane season

Hurricane Pamela was a Category 1 Pacific hurricane that caused significant damage across several northwestern and western states of Mexico in October 2021. The sixteenth named storm and seventh hurricane of the 2021 Pacific hurricane season, the storm originated from a tropical wave over the Atlantic basin, over the Caribbean Sea. It then quickly crossed into the Pacific Ocean, where it slowly consolidated, with a low-pressure area forming from the wave on October 9. Environmental conditions in the area were proved favorable for tropical cyclogenesis and developed into Tropical Depression Sixteen-E on the next day. It then organized further into Tropical Storm Pamela on that night. Despite wind shear and dry air affecting the cyclone, Pamela continued to strengthen and became a hurricane on October 12 before weakening back to a tropical storm as it continued to succumb onto these factors. However, as the system turned towards the coast of Mexico, Pamela restrengthened to a low-end hurricane before making landfall over Estacion Dimas, Sinaloa on 15:00 UTC on October 13 before rapidly weakening inland. It then dissipated over Coahuila on the early hours on the next day.

Pamela caused widespread flooding and blackouts across Sinaloa, Nayarit, Durango and Coahuila while seven deaths were confirmed from the storm. Many agricultural crops, trees, houses and huts across the affected areas were damaged or destroyed following the storm. Many rivers also overflowed, affecting and submerging many cars and establishments. Many people lost their homes due to Pamela's flooding and one person was swept up in Nayarit, where four people were also reported missing. Two people died in Texas after being swept away into a creek. The hurricane was responsible for $94.4 million (2021 USD) in damages across Mexico alone and at least three total deaths. The remnant moisture from Pamela contributed to severe weather in the eastern United States from October 15-16.

== Meteorological history ==
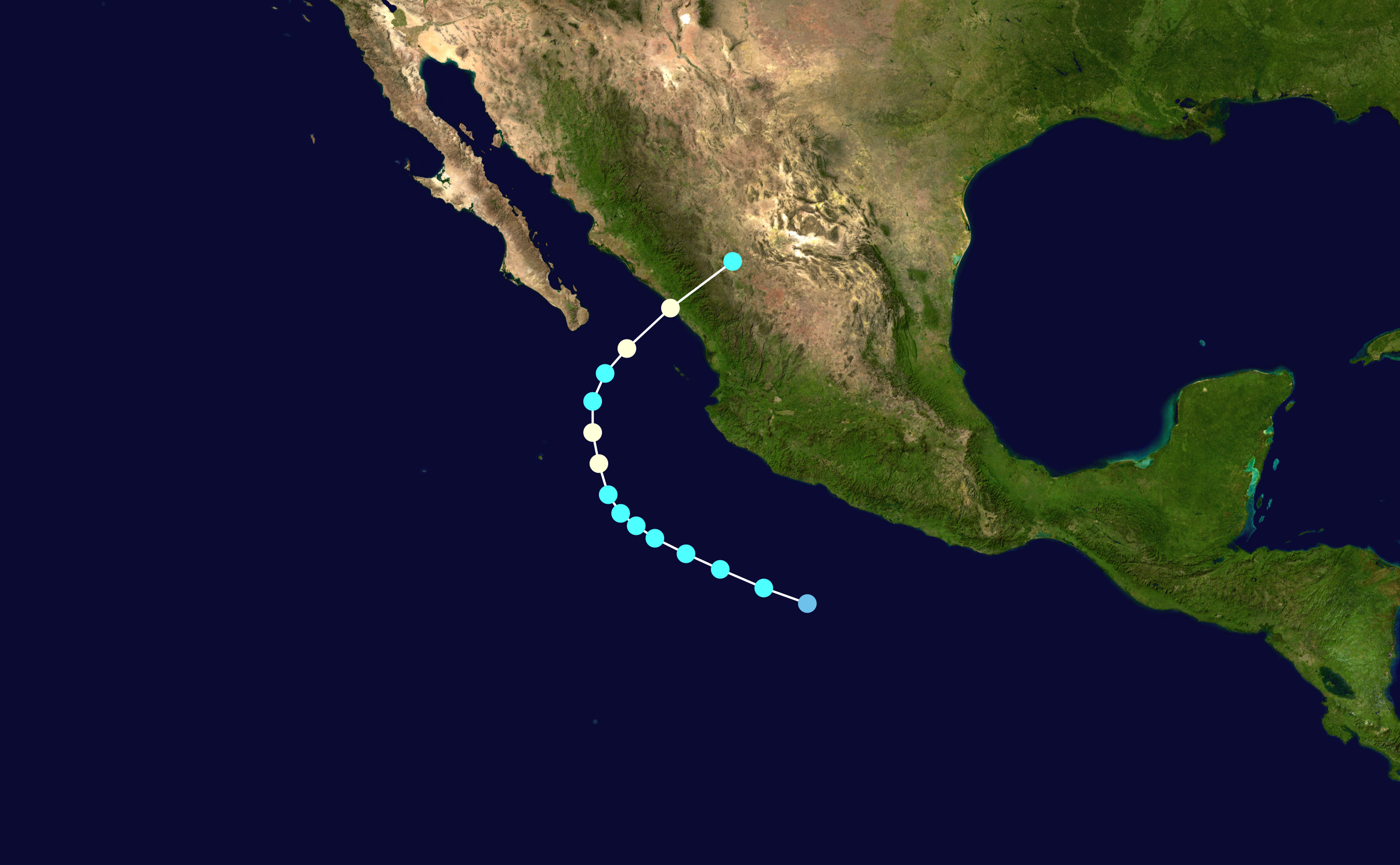
Map plotting the storm's track and intensity, according to the Saffir–Simpson scale Map key Saffir–Simpson scale Tropical depression (≤38 mph, ≤62 km/h) Tropical storm (39–73 mph, 63–118 km/h) Category 1 (74–95 mph, 119–153 km/h) Category 2 (96–110 mph, 154–177 km/h) Category 3 (111–129 mph, 178–208 km/h) Category 4 (130–156 mph, 209–251 km/h) Category 5 (≥157 mph, ≥252 km/h) Unknown Storm type Tropical cyclone Subtropical cyclone Extratropical cyclone, remnant low, tropical disturbance, or monsoon depression

On October 7 at 06:00 UTC, the National Hurricane Center (NHC) began to monitor a tropical wave, along with its disorganized showers and thunderstorms centered over the southwestern Caribbean Sea, or near Nicaragua for possible tropical cyclogenesis in the Eastern Pacific basin. The aforementioned disturbance crossed the country and nearby Costa Rica, emerging over the Pacific on the next day. The system subsequently took a westward track and on 00:00 UTC on October 9, a broad area of low pressure developed from the wave. However, its convection remained disorganized until it became better organized on the next day.

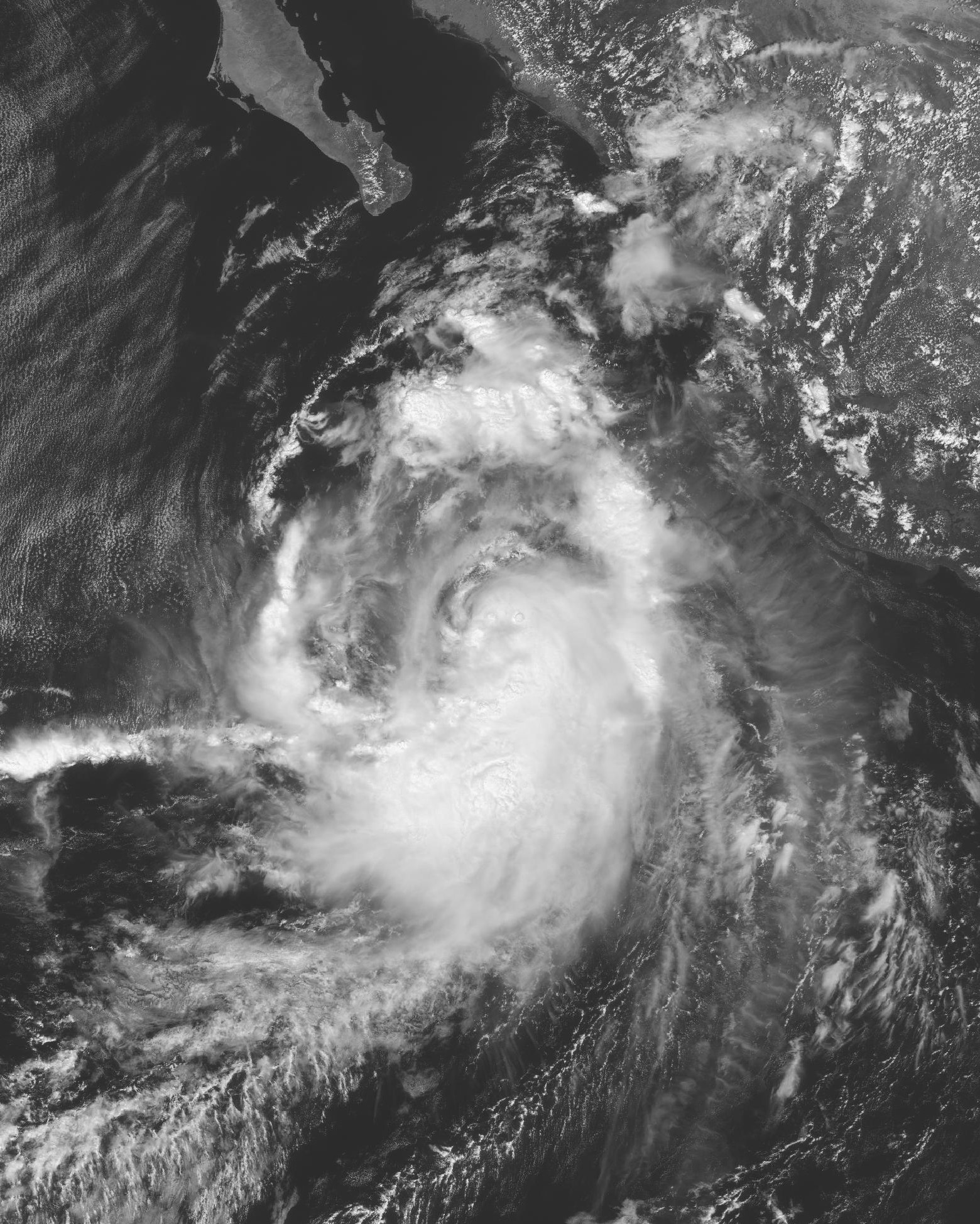
Tropical Storm Pamela on October 11 taken from the red visible band onboard GOES-17.

A 02:57 UTC ASCAT pass on that day revealed a developing closed circulation on the system. With the additional scatterometer data retrieved from the disturbance and Dvorak ratings of T2.0, along with its increasing convection, the NHC started initiating its first advisory on Tropical Depression Sixteen-E, the first active tropical cyclone in the basin in nearly a month. Later, cloud tops colder than -80 °C sprawling onto the new depression, initiating a west-northwestward motion, the system was located over an area conductive for further development. that night, convection got further concentrated into its low level circulation center (LLCC), although it became partially exposed due to northeasterly wind shear. However, gale-force winds were detected by a scatterometer pass in its northeastern quadrant and as a result, the NHC upgraded the depression to a tropical storm, assigning it the name “Pamela” on 21:00 UTC. Despite the shear and dry air, Pamela continued to intensify near hurricane status on the next day and becoming a fully-fledged Category 1 system, twelve hours later while turning northwards. Pamela underwent a convective bursting phase at this time, and it continued intensifying slowly to its first peak of 70 knots (130 km/h; 81 mph) regardless of wind shear disrupting its outflow layer before weakening to a high-end tropical storm at 21:00 UTC on October 12, based on the data retrieved from an Air Force reconnaissance aircraft that investigated the system that day. By the next day, Pamela turned to the north-northeast and maintained its tropical storm intensity before reintensifying to a low-end Category 1 hurricane once again as the system neared the coast of Mexico on 09:00 UTC on October 13.

Three hours later, Pamela made landfall over Estacion Dimas, Sinaloa with winds of 75 mph, soon after it was downgraded to a tropical storm at 15:00 UTC while located inland. Rapid weakening further took toll on Pamela while accelerating across the rugged terrains of Mexico, with the system weakening to a tropical depression, six hours later, the NHC issued its final advisory as the agency declared the system to have dissipated on 03:00 UTC on October 14 while over Coahuila.

== Preparations ==
The Government of Mexico issued tropical cyclone watches across the affected areas of Mexico, starting on 15:00 UTC on October 11 and ended as Pamela weakened to a tropical depression inland. The Comisión Nacional del Agua (National Water Commission) also issued an alert for the Mexican state of Sinaloa due to the possible threat of Pamela. The storm was also anticipated to bring heavy rainfall with possible landslides, strong winds, rough seas and a possible increase in water levels of streams and rivers throughout the coastal and inland areas of Baja California Sur, Sinaloa, Durango and Nayarit, according to the Servicio Meteorológico Nacional. The former's State Council of Civil Protection also declared the state itself in an alert due to Pamela's approach. The Cabo San Lucas' port was closed to all boats while 8 safety shelters in La Paz and 11 in Cabo San Lucas were opened in case of possible evacuation. The Comisión Federal de Electricidad (CFE) also sent some of its people on the latter to fix possible electrical problems. The government of Sinaloa put 10 of its southern municipalities in red alert due to the threat of the storm while 13 flights were canceled by the Mazatlán International Airport for October 13. 40 shelters were opened for possible heavy rains and strong winds. The Civil Protection in Mazatlán also noted that over 80 areas in the state were in risk of possible flooding, with 23 people going to safety shelters to ride out the storm.

== Impact ==
=== Mexico ===
The passage of the outer bands of Pamela caused flooding in Colima. In Manzanillo, these inundations caused several towns to be cut off. A stream on Colimilla overflowed due to heavy rains, resulting in people in the place crossing by boat to go through the nearby Barra de Navidad, Jalisco. On October 11 in that morning, a hotel worker in Colima tried to cross a stream, but was unsuccessful as the person were already swept away by the current; however, they managed to escape the accident without being harmed. The road connecting the Ejido el Huizcolote with Camotlán collapsed due to the storm; the thoroughfare were already previously damaged because of rainfall. Several highways also sustained damages throughout Manzanillo and Colima due to various reasons. Rainfall from the storm also flooded central areas of Tecuala, Nayarit. This made passengers and motorists wade the swamped roadways. Other municipalities to its north were also affected by torrential downpours. The waters of the river that passes through Huajicori was reported to have been rising due to the amount of rainfall being collected along the mountainous areas of Durango and Zacatecas, forcing the passage through Quiviquinta, a town over Nayarit to be temporarily closed. 4 people were also missing in Nayarit, including three public officials and two residents of the Huajicori Riverbed. In the municipalities of Acaponeta, Tecuala and Tuxpan, there were floods with water reaching 5 meters high.

Several palm trees were swaying in the wind brought by Pamela in Sinaloa while a bank lost its windows, authorities there reported. Many trees were also uprooted by the storm in Mazatlan. Shops and restaurants in the beach resort area also sustained damages due to the system. The Mexican National Guard informed Reuters that their people performed rescues in people whose trapped in their homes as a result of flooding. Many palapas in Isla de la Piedra were destroyed as a result of the storm's strong winds. Landslides also affected a part of the Mazatlán-Durango tollway and the libre (free highway) between the same cities. However, Mazatlan authorities reported only minor damages from Pamela, the worst being the flooding in several neighborhoods of the area. 141.0 millimetres (5.55 in) of rain were recorded in the area, according to the Comité Local de Atención a Emergencias (CLAE). Meanwhile, the Comisión Federal de Electricidad (CFE) restored 57% of power that was cut during Pamela's passage on October 13. Over 195,990 customers were affected overall. Over 10,732 lost their electricity in the state of Nayarit, 173,191 in Sinaloa, 9,887 in Durango and 2,980 in Coahuila.

The Acaponeta River in Nayarit overflowed their banks, which resulted in the inundation of several nearby towns. Individuals near the area were also forced to climb onto their cars and wait for help or seek shelter in higher ground. The Tepic-Mazatlán highway was also included in the affected areas by the overflowing of the said river, in which two people were trapped in the Tecuala toll booth, with one person being swept away and the other being rescued. The subdivision of Urbi Villa del Rey in Los Mochis was also inundated by the storm's rainfall, although public transportation was not affected. As the Baluarte River also overflowed, the municipality of Rosario in Sinaloa promptly evacuated more than 1,500 families in 6 communities in the area. Authorities there also described the damages in the area as "catastrophic". Tecuala, Nayarit was also reported by the authorities as inaccessible, due to rains generated by Pamela, causing a large sinkhole in Acaponeta-Tecuala road. 7,648 hectares (18,900 acres) of cropland were also damaged in Sinaloa, in which the chili pepper industry suffered the most. Over 9,106 people were affected in Nayarit and 8,000 of them early lost their homes. Despite the disaster, the rains brought by Pamela were reported as "beneficial" on Carrizo Valley as crops there are still growing and they are mostly needed. Damages from Pamela were calculated at 1.94 billion pesos (US$94.4 million) in Mexico, almost all of which occurred in Sinaloa.

=== Southern United States ===
Despite dissipating over the mountainous terrain of Mexico, Pamela's remnant moisture moved into Texas, where two individuals were killed after they were swept into a creek in Bexar County. Five other individuals were rescued from two vehicles. Heavy rainfall also affected San Antonio, with 3.5 inches (89 mm) being recorded there, and 7 inches (180 mm) recorded in Gonzales County. Multiple water rescues were also carried out in the state, due to the storm.

== See also ==
- Weather of 2021
- Tropical cyclones in 2021
- Timeline of the 2021 Pacific hurricane season
- List of Category 1 Pacific hurricanes
- Other storms of the same name
