= List of storms named Pierre =

The name Pierre has been used for two tropical cyclones worldwide, both in the Australian region.

- Cyclone Pierre (1985) – paralleled the Queensland coast but only produced minor damage.
- Cyclone Pierre (2007) – an off-season storm which affected Queensland, Papua New Guinea and the Solomon Islands.
