= List of storms named Penny =

The name Penny has been used for three tropical cyclones worldwide, one in the Western Pacific Ocean and two in the Australian Region.

In the Western Pacific:

- Tropical Storm Penny (1998) – a severe tropical storm that affected Philippines.

In the Australian Region:

- Cyclone Penny (1974) – a Category 2 tropical cyclone that did not affect any land.
- Cyclone Penny (2018) – a Category 2 tropical cyclone that affected northern Australia.
