= List of storms named Priscilla =

The name Priscilla has been used for ten tropical cyclones worldwide; eight in the Eastern Pacific, and once in the Western Pacific and Australian region.

In the Eastern Pacific:

- Hurricane Priscilla (1967) – a Category 1 hurricane that did not affect land
- Hurricane Priscilla (1971) – a Category 3 hurricane that made landfall in Mexico as a strong tropical storm
- Tropical Storm Priscilla (1975) – did not affect land
- Hurricane Priscilla (1983) – a Category 3 hurricane that stayed out to sea; remnants affected the Southwestern United States
- Tropical Storm Priscilla (1989) – brushed Mexico before moving out to sea
- Tropical Storm Priscilla (2013) – did not affect land
- Tropical Storm Priscilla (2019) – made landfall in Mexico
- Hurricane Priscilla (2025) – a large Category 3 hurricane that affected several Mexican states while it passed near the coastline

In the Western Pacific:

- Typhoon Priscilla (1946) – a Category 3 typhoon that did not affect land

In the Australian region:

- Cyclone Priscilla (1970) – weak cyclone that did not affect land
