= List of storms named Pamela =

The name Pamela has been used for eleven tropical cyclones worldwide, one in the Eastern Pacific Ocean and ten in the Western Pacific.

In the Eastern Pacific:

- Hurricane Pamela (2021) – made landfall in Sinaloa, Mexico, as a Category 1 hurricane.

In the Western Pacific:

- Typhoon Pamela (1954) (T5416)
- Tropical Storm Pamela (1958) (T5823, 28W)
- Typhoon Pamela (1961) (T6118, 50W)
- Tropical Storm Pamela (1964) (T6419, 24W)
- Typhoon Pamela (1966) (T6630, 38W, Aning)
- Tropical Storm Pamela (1970) (T7004, 03W, Klaring)
- Typhoon Pamela (1972) (T7227, 29W, Toyang)
- Typhoon Pamela (1976) (T7608, 06W) – struck Guam as a Category 4 super typhoon.
- Tropical Storm Pamela (1979) (T7916, 20W) – remained out to sea.
- Typhoon Pamela (1982) (T8225, 27W, Aning) – struck the Philippines.
