= Tropical Storm Vera (1989) =

1989 Pacific tropical storm

Tropical Storm Vera (Pining)
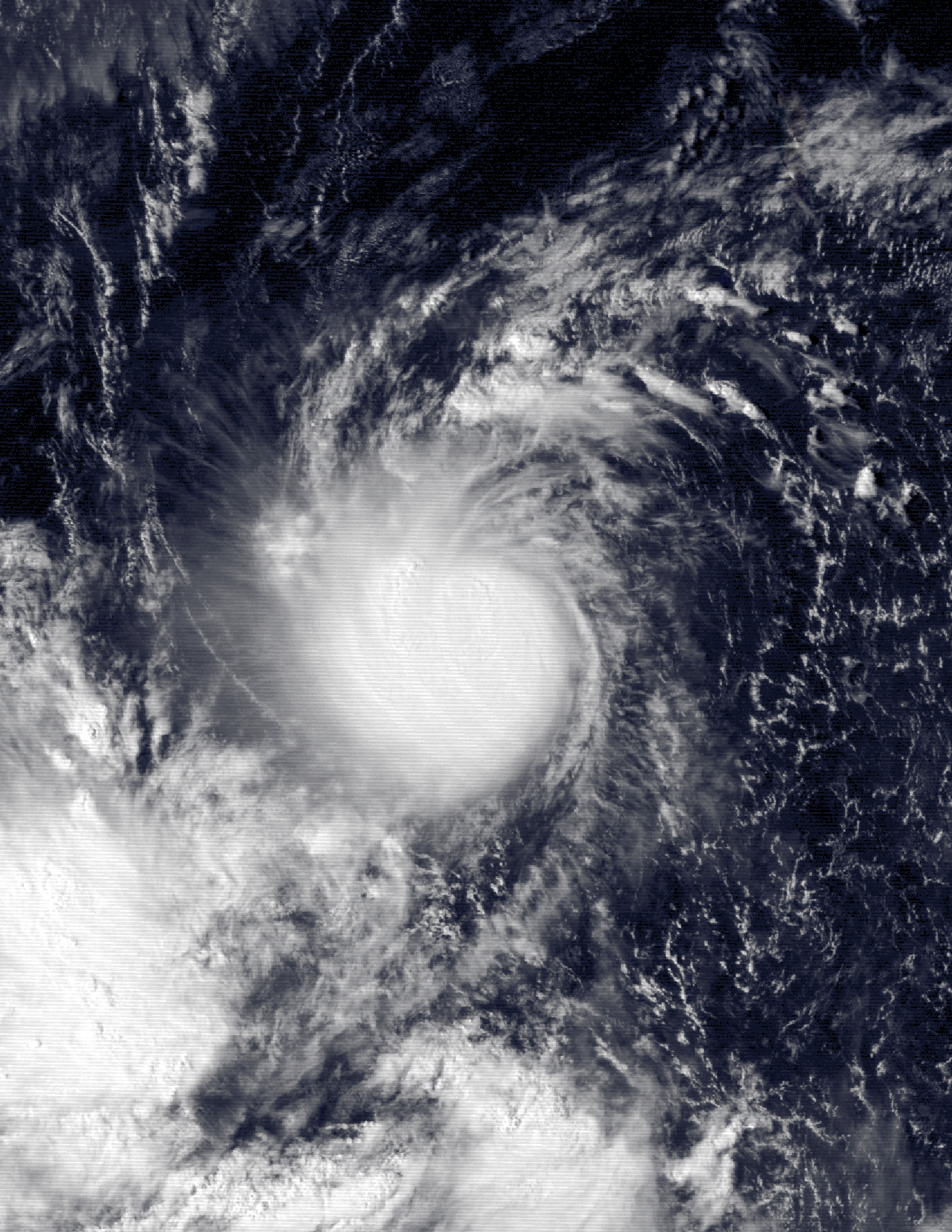
- Tropical Storm Vera on September 13, 1989

Meteorological history
- Formed: September 11, 1989
- Dissipated: September 16, 1989

Severe tropical storm
- 10-minute sustained (JMA)
- Highest winds: 100 km/h (65 mph)
- Lowest pressure: 980 hPa (mbar); 28.94 inHg

Tropical storm
- 1-minute sustained (SSHWS/JTWC)
- Highest winds: 95 km/h (60 mph)
- Lowest pressure: 987 hPa (mbar); 29.15 inHg

Overall effects
- Fatalities: 500–700 total
- Injuries: > 882
- Missing: > 354
- Damage: $351 million (1989 USD)
- Areas affected: China; Korea; Japan
- Part of the 1989 Pacific typhoon season

Tropical Storm Vera, known in the Philippines as Severe Tropical Storm Pining, originated from a system that began to develop within a monsoon trough several hundred kilometers north of Guam on September 10. The JTWC issued a TCFA early on September 11, and the system was classified as a tropical depression later that day. The depression moved slowly and erratically at first, but then it was steered west-northwest by a subtropical ridge. It strengthened into a tropical storm, being named Vera, and reached its peak intensity with winds of 95 km/h (60 mph). The storm then weakened due to increasing wind shear and made landfall in China. It weakened further and became an extratropical cyclone on September 16. The remnants of the storm moved east-northeast over South Korea and Japan before dissipating on September 19.

Vera caused widespread flooding throughout Eastern China, with the worst damage occurring in Zhejiang Province, which reached $351 million (1989 USD), and at least 162 people were killed in and 354 were missing. 882 people were injured, and 3.1 million homes were damaged or destroyed. Additionally, significant losses also occurred in nearby Jiangsu Province, where 34 people were killed and an estimated 2,000 more were injured. Throughout eastern China, approximately 5.86 million households (23 million people) were affected by flooding triggered by the storm. According to news estimates, a total of 500–700 people died as a result of Vera.

== Meteorological history ==
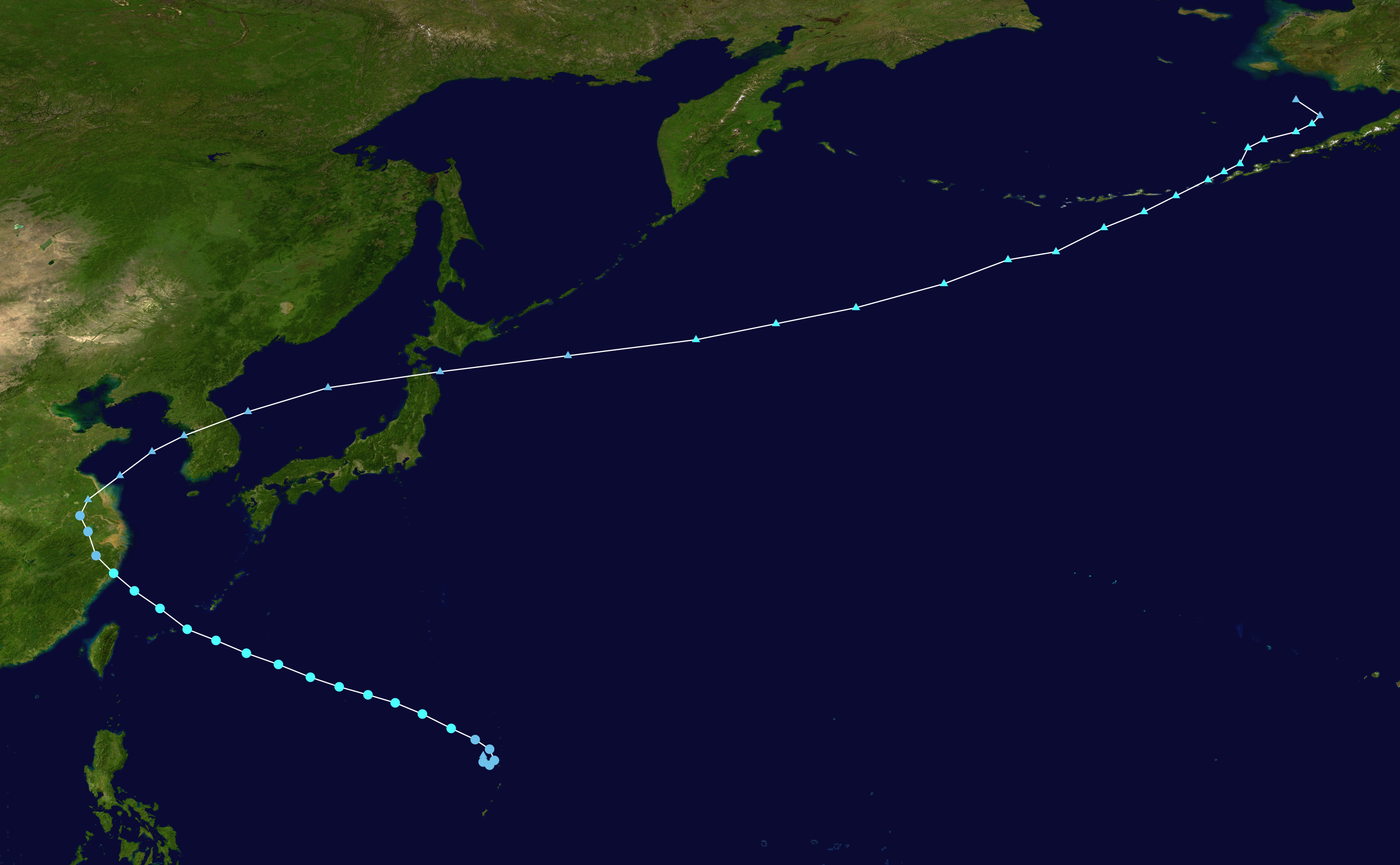
Map plotting the storm's track and intensity, according to the Saffir–Simpson scale Map key Saffir–Simpson scale Tropical depression (≤38 mph, ≤62 km/h) Tropical storm (39–73 mph, 63–118 km/h) Category 1 (74–95 mph, 119–153 km/h) Category 2 (96–110 mph, 154–177 km/h) Category 3 (111–129 mph, 178–208 km/h) Category 4 (130–156 mph, 209–251 km/h) Category 5 (≥157 mph, ≥252 km/h) Unknown Storm type Tropical cyclone Subtropical cyclone Extratropical cyclone, remnant low, tropical disturbance, or monsoon depression

On September 10, 1989, an area of low-level convergence developed within a monsoon trough several hundred kilometers north of Guam. The Joint Typhoon Warning Center (JTWC) began to monitor the disturbance on September 11, and issued a Tropical Cyclone Formation Alert (TCFA) early that morning. The system was classified as a tropical depression at 18:00 UTC on September 11, with maximum sustained winds of 45 km/h (28 mph). The depression moved slowly and erratically to the west-northwest and began to intensify as it was steered by a subtropical ridge. It was upgraded to a tropical storm at 00:00 UTC on September 12, with maximum sustained winds of 65 km/h (40 mph). Vera continued to intensify and reached its peak intensity at 12:00 UTC on September 13, with maximum sustained winds of 95 km/h (60 mph) and a central pressure of 964 mbar (hPa; 28.47 inHg). Vera began to weaken as it approached China, due to increasing wind shear. It made landfall on the coast of China about 240 km (150 mi) south of Shanghai at 12:00 UTC on September 15. The storm weakened to a tropical depression as it moved overland and dissipated on September 16. The remnants of Vera later transitioned into an extratropical cyclone on September 16 as it emerged over the Yellow Sea. The system tracked east-northeast for several days, passing over South Korea and northern Japan before moving over north Pacific Ocean. Vera was last noted as a powerful system near the International Date Line on September 19 with a central pressure of 964 mbar (hPa; 28.47 inHg).

== Preparations and impact ==
Although only a tropical storm at landfall, torrential rains associated with Vera triggered widespread flooding throughout eastern China. Damage from the storm was regarded as the worst in 27 years. Large parts of Zhejiang Province were inundated by the storm, including the port city of Hangzhou. Early reports indicated that at least 190 people were injured near Shanghai. Two days after the storm, only scarce reports on the scale of damage were available. On September 18, officials announced over national television that at least 72 people were killed, and hundreds were missing. By then, workers began repairing damaged coastlines and building up stone sea walls. According to the nation's flood control officials, approximately 347,000 hectares (860,000 acres) of farmland and 16,000 hectares (40,000 acres) of crops were flooded by the storm. At least 162 people were killed and another 354 were listed as missing. Additionally, 692 people were injured by the storm. Immense structural losses took place throughout the province with 3.1 million homes damaged or destroyed. Additionally, 430 km (270 mi) of coastal dykes and 174 km (108 mi) of irrigation ditches were washed away. Total losses throughout Zhejiang Province reached $351 million. Significant losses also took place in nearby Jiangsu Province where 34 people were killed and an estimated 2,000 more were injured. Approximately 590,000 hectares (1.5 million acres) of farmland was inundated by the storm and total losses reached $485,000. Throughout eastern China, approximately 5.86 million households (23 million people) were affected by flooding triggered by the storm. According to news estimates, a total of 500–700 people died as a result of Vera.

== See also ==
- Typhoon Cora (1966) – a category 5-equivalent typhoon that devastated East China; named the 2nd Miyako-jima Typhoon by the Japan Meteorological Agency (JMA).
- Tropical Storm Bill (1988) – a deadly tropical storm which also made landfall in East China.
- Tropical Storm Ken-Lola (1989) – a tropical storm that took a comparable trajectory in the same season.
- Typhoon Abe (1990) – a category 2-equivalent typhoon that took a similar track.
- Tropical Storm Rumbia (2018) – a costly tropical storm that affected similar areas.
