= List of storms named Pancho =

The name Pancho has been used for three tropical cyclones in the Australian region.

- Cyclone Pancho (1986), a Category 2 tropical cyclone.
- Cyclone Pancho (1997), a Category 5 severe tropical cyclone; crossed into the Indian Ocean and was renamed Helinda.
- Cyclone Pancho (2008), a category 4 severe tropical cyclone.
