= List of storms named Polo =

The name Polo has been used for six tropical cyclones in the East Pacific Ocean:

- Hurricane Polo (1984) – a Category 3 hurricane that struck southern Baja California as a tropical depression
- Hurricane Polo (1990) – a low-end Category 1 hurricane that remained at sea
- Tropical Storm Polo (2008) – a weak late-season storm that stayed at sea
- Hurricane Polo (2014) – a Category 1 hurricane that paralleled the Mexican coastline but did not make landfall
- Tropical Storm Polo (2020) – a weak late-season storm that remained at sea
- Hurricane Polo (2026) – a Category 5 hurricane that impacted Baja California Sur as a Category 2 and became the second-most intense Pacific hurricane by central pressure

== See also ==
Storms with similar names

- Hurricane Nolo (2026) (T2628, 15E) – a Category 4 Central Pacific hurricane that neared Hawaii; crossed over into the Western Pacific and was reclassified as Typhoon Nolo
- Cyclone Pola (2019) – a Category 4 South Pacific severe tropical cyclone
- Storm Poly (2023) – a European windstorm that became the strongest summer storm to impact the Netherlands on record
