= List of storms named Pearl =

The name Pearl has been used for three tropical cyclones worldwide, one in the Western Pacific Ocean and two in the Australian region.

In the Western Pacific:

- Typhoon Pearl (1948) (T4806, 06W)

In the Australian region:

- Tropical Low Pearl (1983) – a tropical low that was classified as a tropical cyclone during the season.
- Cyclone Pearl-Farah (1994) – a severe tropical cyclone that had no impacts on land which later crossed over to the South-West Indian Ocean.
