= List of storms named Paolo =

The name Paolo has been used for three tropical cyclones in the Philippine Area of Responsibility by PAGASA in the Western Pacific Ocean. It replaced the name Pepeng after it was retired following the 2009 Pacific typhoon season.

- Typhoon Wutip (2013) (T1321, 20W, Paolo) – formed near the western Philippines and made landfall in northern Vietnam.
- Typhoon Lan (2017) (T1721, 25W, Paolo) – a very large and strong typhoon that impacted Japan.
- Typhoon Matmo (2025) (T2521, 27W, Paolo) – a Category 2 typhoon that made landfall in Philippines and South China.

Preceded by Omar	Pacific typhoon season names Paolo	Succeeded by Quedan
