= List of storms named Patricia =

The name Patricia has been used for five tropical cyclones in the East Pacific Ocean and one in the West Pacific Ocean. Patricia has also been used for two European windstorms.

In the East Pacific:

- Hurricane Patricia (1970) – Category 2 hurricane that remained in the open ocean
- Hurricane Patricia (1974) – Category 1 hurricane that remained at sea
- Hurricane Patricia (2003) – Category 1 hurricane that also remained far from land
- Tropical Storm Patricia (2009) – briefly affected parts of Baja California Sur, causing no damage
- Hurricane Patricia (2015) – an exceptionally intense Category 5 hurricane that made landfall near Jalisco, Mexico; the strongest storm ever recorded in the Western Hemisphere, the second-strongest worldwide in terms of pressure, and the strongest in terms of 1-minute sustained winds

After the 2015 season, the name Patricia was retired and replaced with Pamela.

In the West Pacific:

- Typhoon Patricia (1949) – a Category 4 typhoon that passed near Japan

In Europe:

- Storm Patricia (2023)
- Storm Patricia (2026)
