= List of storms named Polly =

The name Polly has been used for 13 tropical cyclones worldwide. Eleven were in the West Pacific Ocean, one was in the Australian region, and one was in the South Pacific Ocean.

In the West Pacific:

- Typhoon Polly (1952)
- Typhoon Polly (1956) – made landfall in Philippines as a category 2 typhoon.
- Typhoon Polly (1960)
- Typhoon Polly (1963) (T6302, 09W, Auring)
- Tropical Storm Polly (1965) (Tasing)
- Tropical Storm Polly (1968)
- Tropical Storm Polly (1971) (Trining)
- Typhoon Polly (1974)
- Tropical Storm Polly (1978) (T7803, 03W, Bising) – struck southern Japan.
- Tropical Storm Polly (1992) (16W, Isang) – triggered devastating floods across Fujian and Zhejiang Provinces in China.
- Typhoon Polly (1995) (18W, Ising) – approached Luzon before curving out to sea.

In the Australian region:

- Tropical Cyclone Polly (1971) – Category 2 tropical cyclone (Australian scale), formed in the Indian Ocean west of the Keeling Islands.

In the South Pacific:

- Cyclone Polly (1993) – Category 3 severe tropical cyclone (Australian scale), developed in the Coral sea well off the Queensland coast and crossed east of the Australian region where it passed to the southwest of New Caledonia.

== See also ==
Storms with similar names

- Hurricane Pali (2016) – the earliest-forming Central Pacific hurricane on record.
- Storm Poly (2023) – a European windstorm that became the strongest summer storm to impact the Netherlands on record.
