= List of storms named Pat =

The name Pat has been used for nine tropical cyclones: seven in the West Pacific Ocean and two in the South Pacific Ocean.

In the West Pacific:

- Typhoon Pat (1948)
- Typhoon Pat (1951)
- Typhoon Pat (1982) – a Category 3 typhoon that neared the Philippines.
- Typhoon Pat (1985) – impacted southern Japan and was known as one of three cyclones that interacted with each other.
- Tropical Storm Pat (1988) – a severe tropical storm that hit the Philippines.
- Typhoon Pat (1991) – a Category 4 typhoon that did not affect land.
- Typhoon Pat (1994) – a Category 2 typhoon that did not affect land.

In the South Pacific:

- Tropical Cyclone Pat (1977) – a weak and short-lived tropical cyclone.
- Cyclone Pat (2010) – affected the Cook Islands.
