= Typhoon Pamela (1954) =

Pacific typhoon in 1954

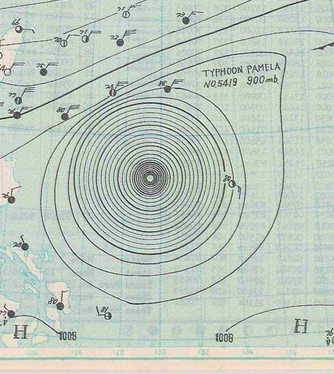
- Pamela at its peak intensity over the West Pacific Ocean on November 2

Meteorological history
- Formed: October 26, 1954
- Dissipated: November 7, 1954

Typhoon
- 10-minute sustained (JMA)
- Lowest pressure: 900 hPa (mbar); 26.58 inHg

Category 5-equivalent super typhoon
- 1-minute sustained (SSHWS/FWC)
- Highest winds: 280 km/h (175 mph)

Overall effects
- Fatalities: 6
- Injuries: 13
- Missing: 26
- Areas affected: Philippines (primarily Luzon), Hong Kong, Macau, South China
- Part of the 1954 Pacific typhoon season

Typhoon Pamela was an intense and destructive typhoon which affected the Philippines, Hong Kong, Macau, and South China during October and November 1954. It was the first of the only four Category 5 Super Typhoons recorded in the South China Sea. The others being Rammasun in 2014, Rai in 2021, and Yagi in 2024.

== Meteorological history ==
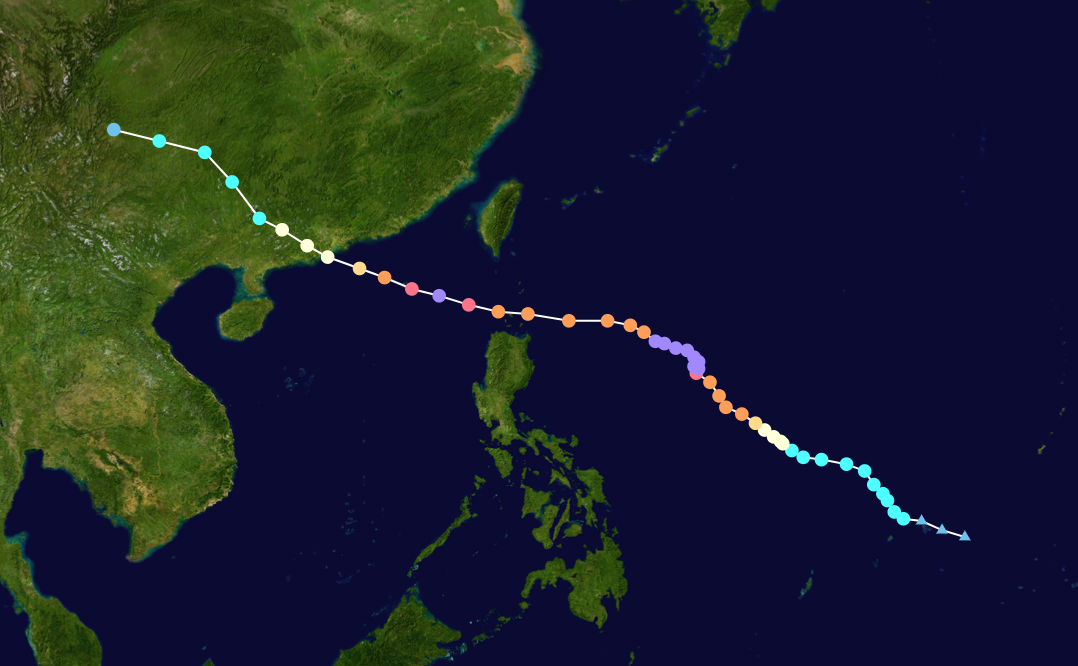
Map plotting the storm's track and intensity, according to the Saffir–Simpson scale Map key Saffir–Simpson scale Tropical depression (≤38 mph, ≤62 km/h) Tropical storm (39–73 mph, 63–118 km/h) Category 1 (74–95 mph, 119–153 km/h) Category 2 (96–110 mph, 154–177 km/h) Category 3 (111–129 mph, 178–208 km/h) Category 4 (130–156 mph, 209–251 km/h) Category 5 (≥157 mph, ≥252 km/h) Unknown Storm type Tropical cyclone Subtropical cyclone Extratropical cyclone, remnant low, tropical disturbance, or monsoon depression

On October 26, a tropical cyclone formed east of the Philippines, having a minimum pressure of 1,006 hPa (29.7 inHg). Early the next day, the Fleet Weather Center (FWC) began tracking the cyclone, which had intensified into a tropical storm, naming it Pamela. The JMA followed suit the next day, noting that it had intensified into a tropical storm and deepened to have a minimum pressure of 998 hPa (29.5 inHg). Intensifying further, on October 30, both the FWC and JMA noted that Pamela had rapidly intensified into a typhoon.

Soon after, Pamela began intensifying again, having 1-minute sustained winds of 100 mph (155 km/h) early on October 31, being a Category 2-equivalent hurricane on the Saffir–Simpson scale. At 12:00 UTC that same day, Pamela would intensify into a super typhoon according to the FWC, attaining a minimum pressure of 960 hPa (28 inHg). Soon after, it peaked with sustained winds of 175 mph (280 km/h), later peaking with a minimum pressure of 900 hPa (27 inHg) early the next day. However, soon after, it began steadily weakening, with its pressures rising steadily.

Despite that, on November 5, Pamela re-intensified into a super typhoon over the South China Sea, becoming the first of only four super typhoons in the area—the others were Yagi in 2024, Rammasun in 2014, and Rai in 2021. The next day, Pamela made landfall in China as a minimal typhoon. As a result, early on September 7, Pamela weakened into a tropical storm, prior to the JMA last tracking the typhoon a few hours later. The FWC kept tracking it until it had weakened into a tropical depression early the next day.

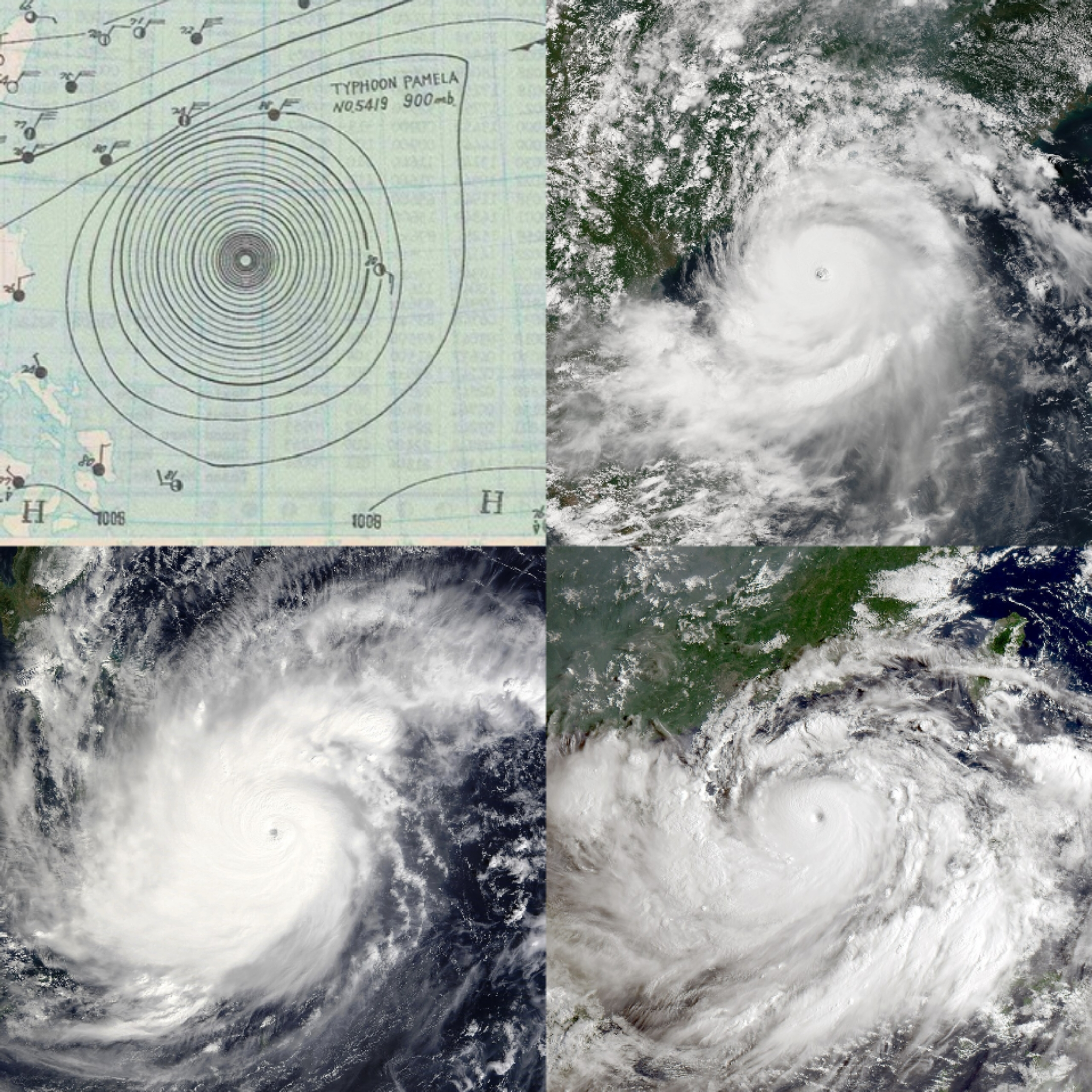
The 4 only Category 5 Super Typhoons recorded in the South China Sea

== Preparations and impact ==
All of Hong Kong's cross harbour ferry services and some tram services were suspended prior to the typhoon. The SS Chusan, which was loading cargo in Victoria Harbour, had to leave it as Pamela approached. In Hong Kong, baby was killed by a loosened rock and three fisherman died after their boat capsized. Additionally, an electrician was indirectly killed while repairing an electrical line broken during the typhoon. In total, five deaths and thirteen injuries were recorded in the island. Both Quarry Bay and North Point received a storm surge of 1.16 m (3.8 ft).

In Haiphong, all of the Task Force 90 ships, vessels which were involved in Operation Passage to Freedom, had to evade the typhoon until November 7. Alongside the southern coast of China, Pamela sunk around 1,100 fishing boats, causing it to be the "worst disaster to the fishing people of South China in a century". The USS Muskingum, a cargo ship which at the time was 130 mi (210 km) southwest of Taiwan, was caught in the typhoon. As a result, the British steamer HMS Birmingham, a Norwegian motor ship Hoi Houw, and a ship off the coast of Luzon began searching for it. A man fell off the USS Helena and had to be saved by a lifeboat crew. Elsewhere, the moorings of the SS Gujarat were torn. Two Hong Kong fishing trawlers, which had a crew of 14 and 12 respectively, went missing due to rough seas produced by Pamela.
