= Cyclone Peni =

Australian cyclone in 1990

Severe Tropical Cyclone Peni
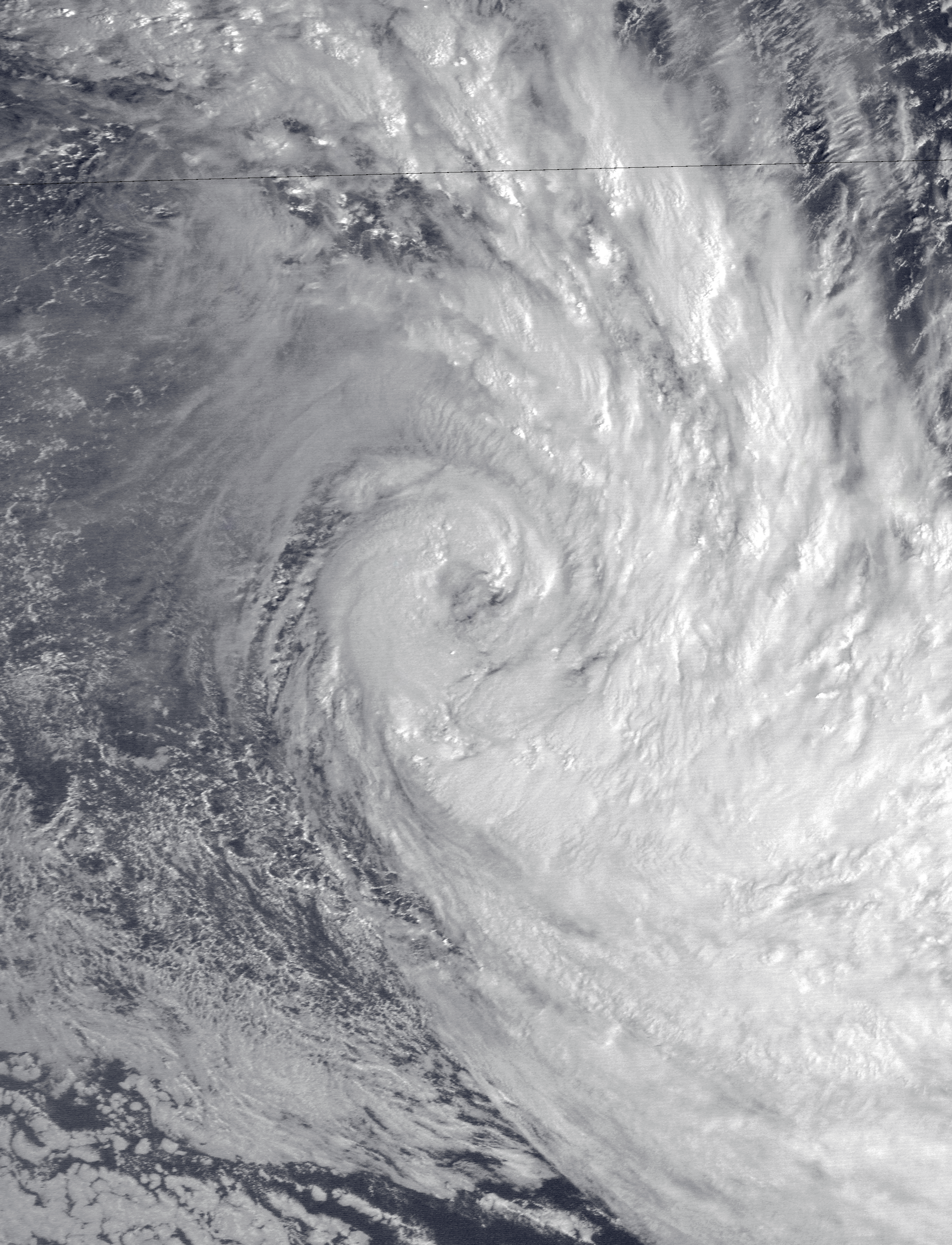
- Cyclone Peni on February 15, 1990

Meteorological history
- Formed: February 12, 1990
- Extratropical: February 17, 1990
- Dissipated: February 18, 1990

Category 3 severe tropical cyclone
- 10-minute sustained (MetService)
- Highest winds: 120 km/h (75 mph)
- Lowest pressure: 970 hPa (mbar); 28.64 inHg

Category 1-equivalent tropical cyclone
- 1-minute sustained (SSHWS/JTWC)
- Highest winds: 130 km/h (80 mph)

Overall effects
- Fatalities: 1
- Damage: $1 million (1990 USD)
- Areas affected: Cook Islands
- Part of the 1989–90 South Pacific cyclone season

Severe Tropical Cyclone Peni was the first and only tropical cyclone to impact and cause significant damage to the Cook Islands in the 1990 South Pacific cyclone season. A shallow area of low-pressure began to develop near Rakahanga, an island in the Cook Island chain. The storm had also formed on the South Pacific convergence zone. The storm was first recognized on February 12, and had received tropical cyclone characteristics on the 13th. At 21:00 UTC, the storm was recognized as Tropical Cyclone Peni. The storm then took a path southwest towards the Cook Islands, Peni made a narrow turn and passed close to Aitutaki. Peni had gained hurricane status on the 15th, at 06:00 UTC. Peni had been able to keep hurricane characteristics until February 17, when it was downgraded to a storm, and soon, was declared extratropical. The name Peni was retired from the naming list.

== Meteorological history ==
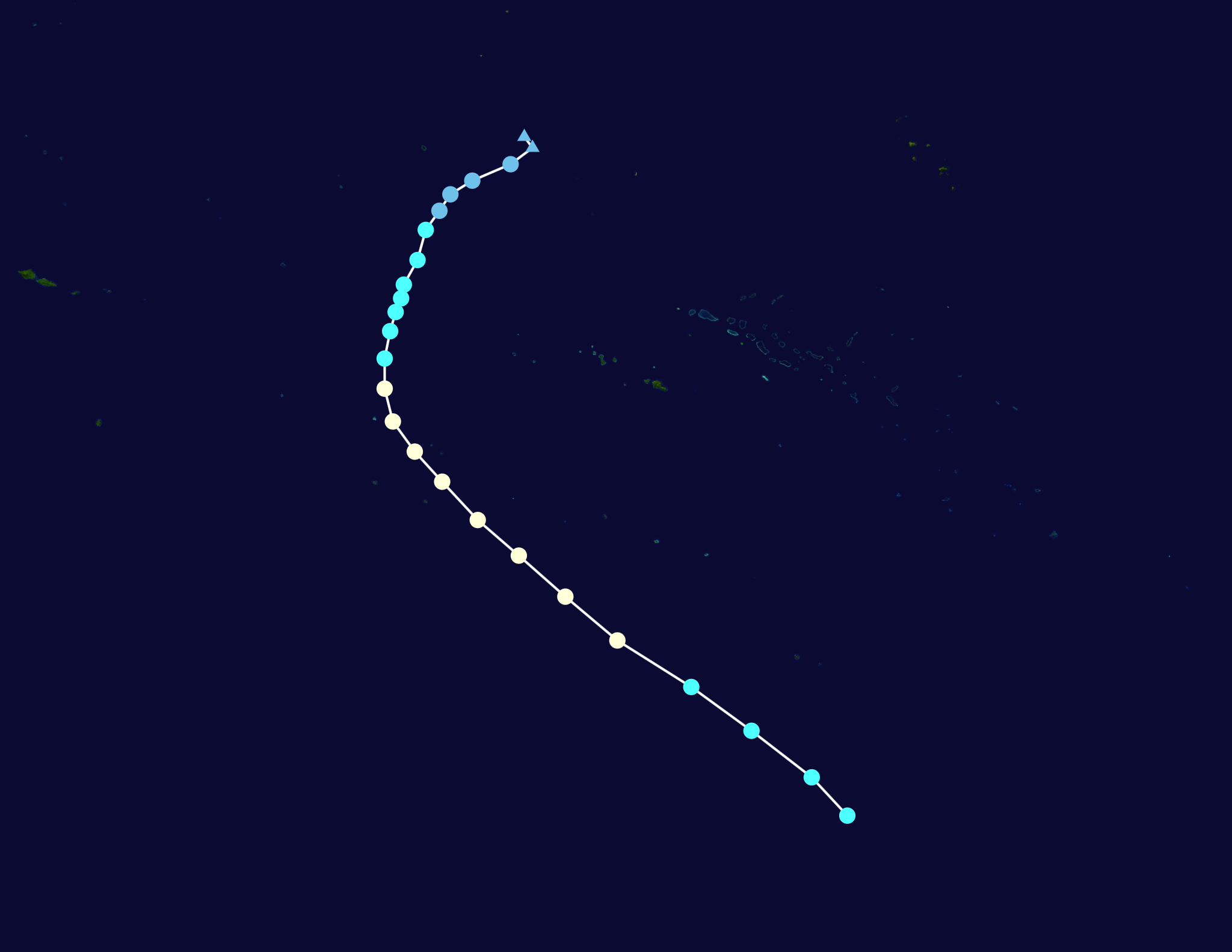
Map plotting the storm's track and intensity, according to the Saffir–Simpson scale Map key Saffir–Simpson scale Tropical depression (≤38 mph, ≤62 km/h) Tropical storm (39–73 mph, 63–118 km/h) Category 1 (74–95 mph, 119–153 km/h) Category 2 (96–110 mph, 154–177 km/h) Category 3 (111–129 mph, 178–208 km/h) Category 4 (130–156 mph, 209–251 km/h) Category 5 (≥157 mph, ≥252 km/h) Unknown Storm type Tropical cyclone Subtropical cyclone Extratropical cyclone, remnant low, tropical disturbance, or monsoon depression

On February 11, 1990, a shallow area of low-pressure which had formed near the South Pacific convergence zone began to develop near Rakahanga. The low-pressure system had gone through development and had acquired tropical cyclone status. The tropical cyclone was designated as Tropical Cyclone Peni on February 12.

Tropical Cyclone Peni had developed normal tropical cyclone characteristics around February 13 and had wind speeds up to 50 kts. Over the next 30 hours, Peni headed southwest towards the Cook archipelago. Peni had taken a steady southwestern track before passing close nearby Aitutkai around 10:00 UTC on the 15th. The Aitutkai Meteorological Office was evacuated due to dreadful and deteriorating weather conditions. At 06:00 UTC, Peni was upgraded to cyclone status. After gaining severe cyclone status, Peni made its closest point to the Cooks archipelago, near Rakahanga. Rakahanga was the only island reporting major damage, and Aitutaki was hit with severe weather.

Cyclone Peni had downgraded to a tropical cyclone on 06:00 UTC on February 17 after encountering the Cook Islands. Peni lost tropical cyclone characteristics as it neared southern vertical wind shear. The storm dissipated in the cold waters of the Pacific Ocean at 17:00 UTC.

== Preparations and impact ==
Not much is known about preparations from Cyclone Peni but the island of Rarotonga was prepared. The Cook Islands had significant impact with Peni. Peni had caused more than $1 million in 1990 USD. The cyclone had brought waves more than 8 meters high. Peni had specifically impacted these 3 islands:

- Rakahanga
- Aitutki
- Rarotonga
- Atiu
- Mangaia
- and Mauke

While Cyclone Peni was still 2" east of Rarotonga, rain and gale winds had spread around the islands. Airstrips in Mauke and Rakahanga were closed due to the harsh weather, but Rarotonga International Airport were still in operation. Wharves on the beaches of Suwarrow were badly damages by the impact. Bananas, coconuts, roads, schools and government buildings were impacted by the storm. One person was killed in Rarotonga.

== Aftermath ==
The governments of Samoa and Australia spoke about Cyclone Peni and Cyclone Ofa and the devastation in the archipelagos in a UNDP session. The Australian representer spoke out, saying:

"Cyclone Ofa had caused widespread devastation in the South Pacific region, and another tropical cyclone – Cyclone Peni – had been wreaking havoc in the region of the northern Cook Islands. The small island developing country of Samoa had been particularly hard hit."

The UNDP had approved 30,000 emergency personnel to the island. The government of New Zealand had a reconnaissance aircraft flight make a fly-by to deliver building materials and fuel to the archipelago. The Cook Island government had asked for an emergency relief, which was granted. The UNDP had given a $4 million (1990 USD) relief for the Cook Islands.
