= Typhoon Elsie (1966) =

Typhoon Elsie (Pitang)
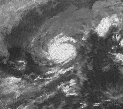
- Elsie's slow movement near Taiwan resulted in prolonged rainfall across the island.

Meteorological history
- Formed: September, 10, 1966
- Dissipated: September, 17, 1966

Very strong typhoon
- 10-minute sustained (JMA)
- Highest winds: 175 km/h (110 mph)
- Lowest pressure: 945 hPa (mbar); 27.91 inHg

Category 4-equivalent typhoon
- 1-minute sustained (SSHWS/JTWC)
- Highest winds: 215 km/h (135 mph)
- Lowest pressure: 943 hPa (mbar); 27.85 inHg

Overall effects
- Fatalities: 7
- Missing: Unknown
- Damage: $60.1 million
- Areas affected: Philippines; Taiwan; China; Japan
- Part of the 1966 Pacific typhoon season

Typhoon Elsie, known in the Philippines as Typhoon Pitang, moved slowly near Taiwan, producing prolonged rainfall across the island. Numerous locations recorded exceptionally high rainfall, with six top-ten storm accumulations still standing as of 2015. Yilan County experienced the highest totals, with 1,076.9 mm (42.40 in) of rain—the largest single-storm accumulation on record for the county. The storm caused seven deaths and injured thirty people in Taiwan. The typhoon's damage included the collapse of 120 homes and structural damage to 121 others, significant losses to the banana crop (totalling approximately $500,000), and overall losses estimated at to NT$60.1 million.

== Meteorological history ==
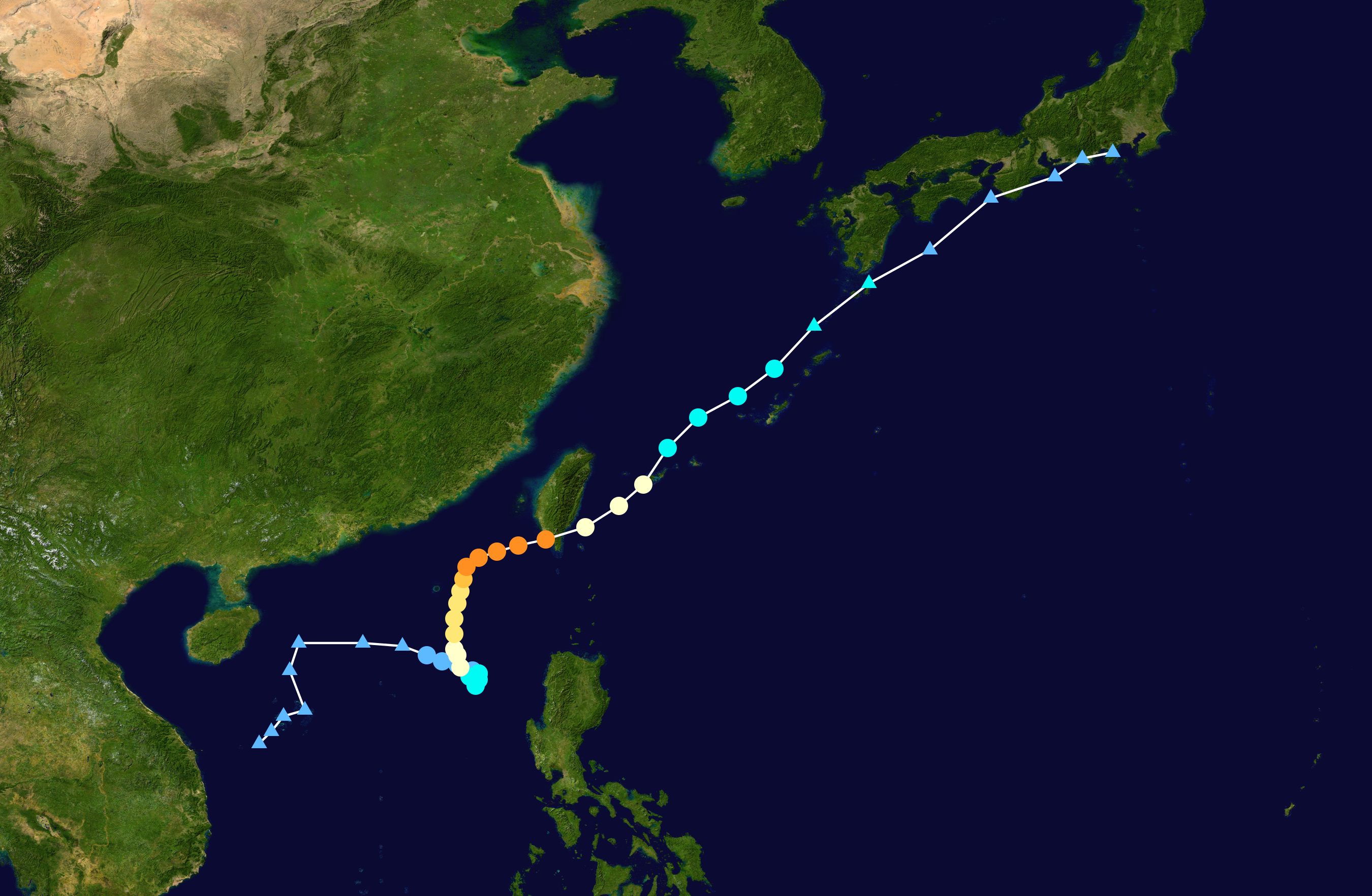
Map plotting the storm's track and intensity, according to the Saffir–Simpson scale Map key Saffir–Simpson scale Tropical depression (≤38 mph, ≤62 km/h) Tropical storm (39–73 mph, 63–118 km/h) Category 1 (74–95 mph, 119–153 km/h) Category 2 (96–110 mph, 154–177 km/h) Category 3 (111–129 mph, 178–208 km/h) Category 4 (130–156 mph, 209–251 km/h) Category 5 (≥157 mph, ≥252 km/h) Unknown Storm type Tropical cyclone Subtropical cyclone Extratropical cyclone, remnant low, tropical disturbance, or monsoon depression

== See also ==
- 1966 Pacific typhoon season
