= Typhoon Page =

Pacific typhoon in 1990

Typhoon Page (Tering)
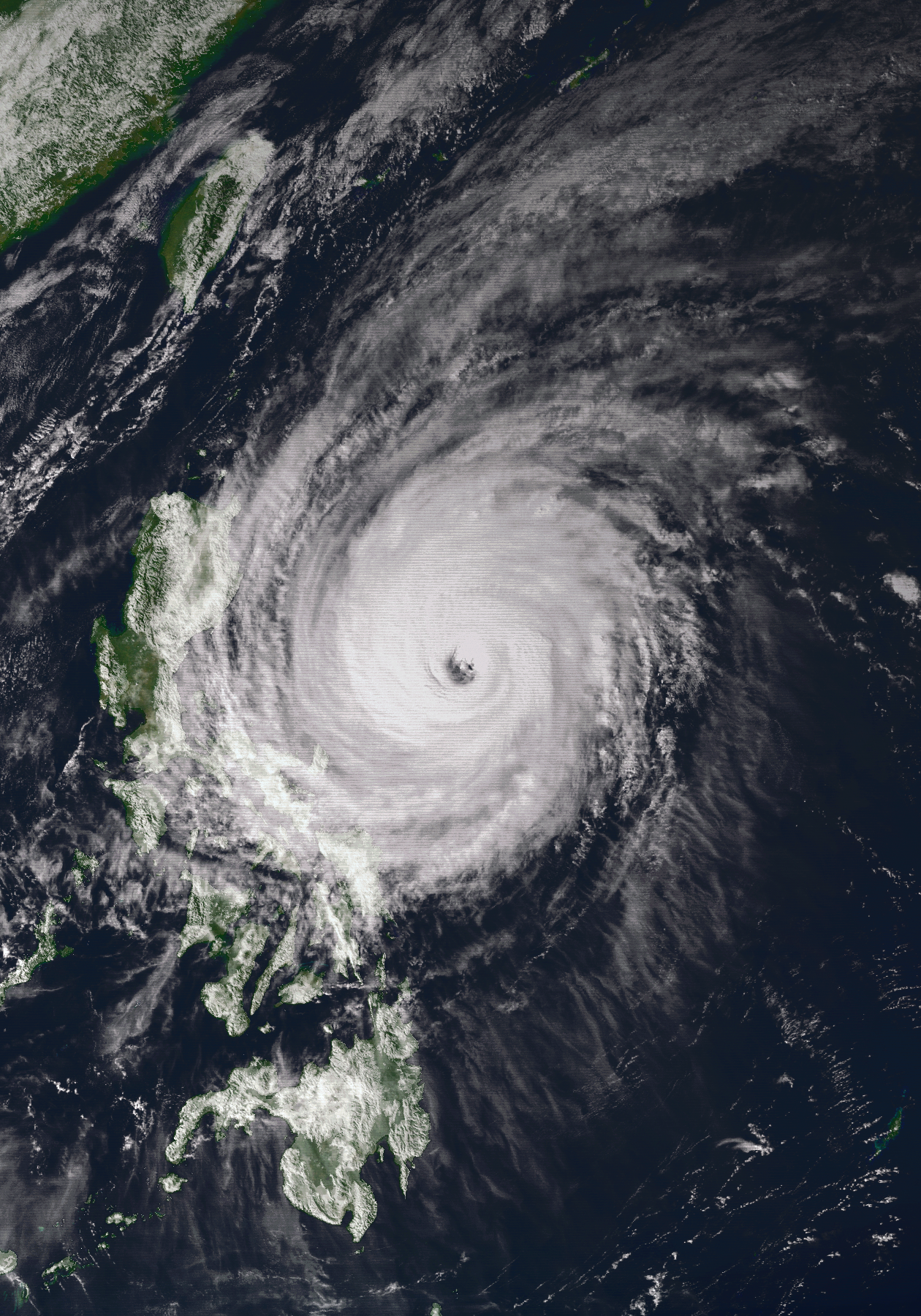
- Typhoon Page near peak on November 27

Meteorological history
- Formed: November 21, 1990
- Extratropical: November 30, 1990
- Dissipated: December 3, 1990

Violent typhoon
- 10-minute sustained (JMA)
- Highest winds: 195 km/h (120 mph)
- Lowest pressure: 910 hPa (mbar); 26.87 inHg

Category 5-equivalent super typhoon
- 1-minute sustained (SSHWS/JTWC)
- Highest winds: 260 km/h (160 mph)
- Lowest pressure: 898 hPa (mbar); 26.52 inHg

Overall effects
- Fatalities: 4 total
- Damage: $33 million (1990 USD)
- Areas affected: Japan
- IBTrACS
- Part of the 1990 Pacific typhoon season

Typhoon Page, known in the Philippines as Super Typhoon Tering, was the fourth tropical cyclone to strike Japan in three months and the sixth in 1990. An area of disturbed weather developed on November 5 near the International Date Line. For more than two weeks, the disturbance failed to develop appreciably while it tracked generally westward. The disturbance began to organize on November 17. Four days later, the disturbance was designated a tropical depression, and on November 22, the depression was classified as a tropical storm. After resuming a westward course, Page intensified into a typhoon on November 24. Page then entered a period of rapid deepening before plateauing in intensity early on November 26. Page turned northwest, north, and later northeast as it rounded a subtropical ridge. Because of the change in steering, Page began to encounter stronger wind shear, which resulted in a prolonged weakening trend. On November 30, Page, just offshore Honshu, weakened below typhoon intensity, and became an extratropical cyclone on the same day after making landfall in central Honshu.

Typhoon Page was the record sixth tropical cyclone to directly affect Japan that year. It also was the latest typhoon to hit the country, with the previous mark set by Typhoon Agnes of the 1948 Pacific typhoon season. In Tokyo, 61 homes were damaged and 16 were destroyed. Elsewhere, in Mie Prefecture, 276 homes were damaged and 9 other homes were destroyed. Overall, four fatalities were reported and twelve others suffered injuries. A total of 162 homes were destroyed while 1,544 other houses were flooded. Nearly 35 hectares (86 acres) of farmland were damaged. Total damage was estimated at 4.8 billion yen (US$33 million).

== Meteorological history ==
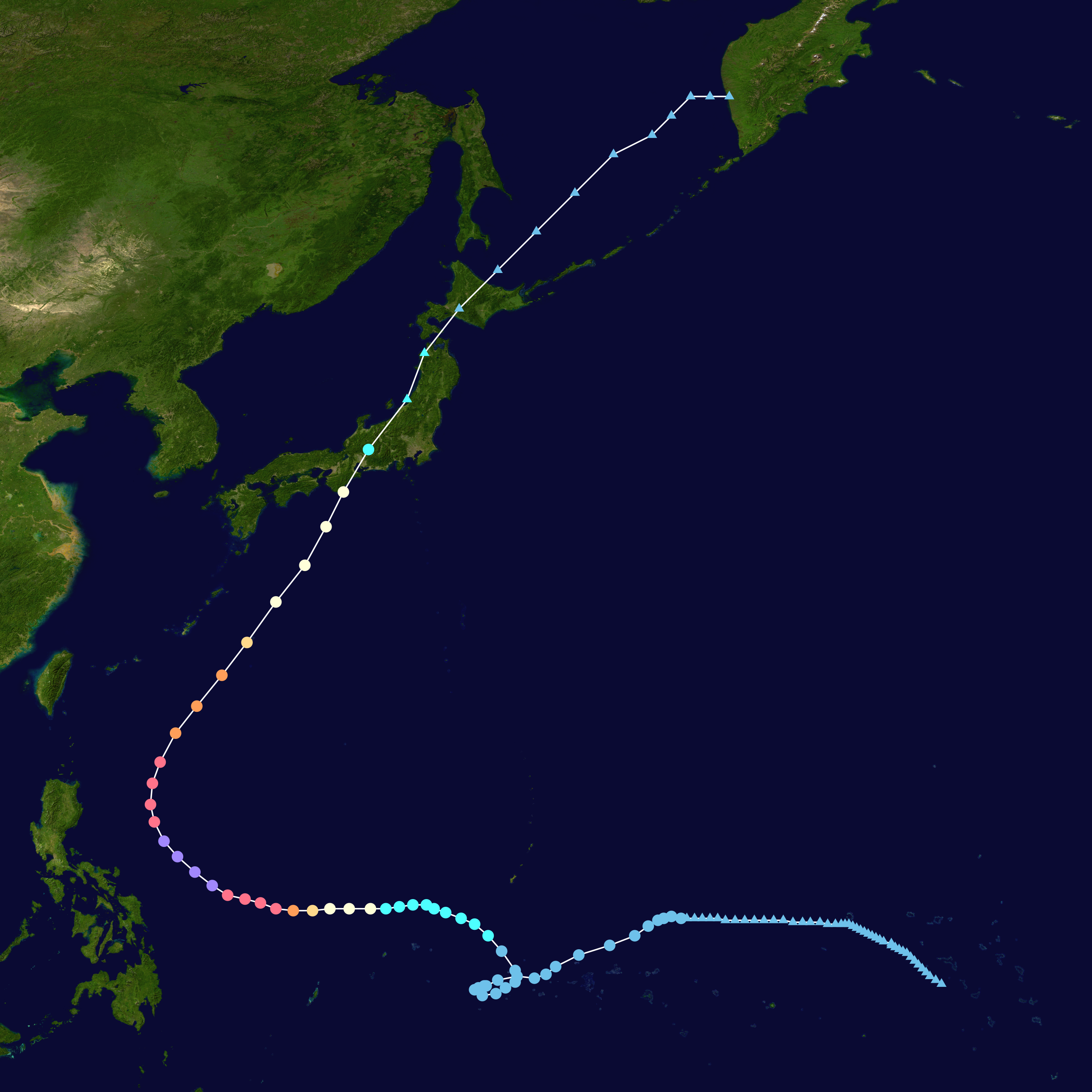
Map plotting the storm's track and intensity, according to the Saffir–Simpson scale Map key Saffir–Simpson scale Tropical depression (≤38 mph, ≤62 km/h) Tropical storm (39–73 mph, 63–118 km/h) Category 1 (74–95 mph, 119–153 km/h) Category 2 (96–110 mph, 154–177 km/h) Category 3 (111–129 mph, 178–208 km/h) Category 4 (130–156 mph, 209–251 km/h) Category 5 (≥157 mph, ≥252 km/h) Unknown Storm type Tropical cyclone Subtropical cyclone Extratropical cyclone, remnant low, tropical disturbance, or monsoon depression

The origins of Typhoon Page can be traced back to an area of disturbed weather that was first tracked by the Joint Typhoon Warning Center (JTWC) at 06:00 UTC on November 5. After forming near the International Date Line, the disturbance tracked northwest initially before turning west three days later. The disturbance failed to develop appreciably due to strong easterly wind shear aloft. Poorly organized, the disturbance then briefly turned west-northwest under the influence of a subtropical ridge. Convection organization improved, and on November 17, Dvorak classifications reached T1.5/30 mph (50 km/h), which prompted the JTWC to issue a Tropical Cyclone Formation Alert. The low-level center became better defined overnight in response to decreased wind shear, and on November 19, the JTWC upgraded the disturbance into a tropical depression.

The depression executed a counterclockwise loop for the next two days. Meanwhile, organized deep convection quickly developed over the center, and on November 21, the disturbance was upgraded into a tropical depression by the Japan Meteorological Agency (JMA). (Note: The Japan Meteorological Agency is the official Regional Specialized Meteorological Center for the western Pacific Ocean.) At that time, the depression was located 580 km (360 mi) east-southeast of Yap. At 00:00 UTC on November 22, the JTWC upgraded the depression into Tropical Storm Page. Several hours later, the JMA followed suit. (Note: Wind estimates from the JMA and most other basins throughout the world are sustained over 10 minutes, while estimates from the United States-based Joint Typhoon Warning Center are sustained over 1 minute. 10-minute winds are about 1.14 times the amount of 1-minute winds.) Resuming a westward track, Page began to intensify at a faster pace on November 23 due to decreased wind shear. The JMA upgraded Page to a severe tropical storm at 18:00 UTC on November 23. Following the development of a small eye, Page was upgraded into a typhoon twelve hours later by the JTWC, with the JMA following suit on the evening of November 24. Page then entered a period of rapid deepening; the JTWC estimated that during a three-day period the pressure fell to 898 mbar (26.5 inHg) and the winds increased by 175 km/h (110 mph). Based on the appearance of a 75 km (45 mi) well-defined eye, Page was declared a super typhoon by the JTWC, the second of the month, at 06:00 UTC on November 26. Six hours later, the JTWC estimated that typhoon attained its highest intensity, with 1-minute sustained winds of 255 km/h (160 mph). Around this time, the JMA also estimated that Page peaked in intensity, with 10-minute sustained winds of 185 km/h (115 mph) and a minimum barometric pressure of 910 mbar (27 inHg).

Typhoon Page, while maintaining peak strength, began to turn northwest on the evening of November 26 as it approached a break in the subtropical ridge. The next day, the typhoon turned northward along the 125th meridian east, then accelerated to the northeast as it rounded a ridge. As a result of the change in steering, Page began to encounter stronger wind shear. A loss in eye definition and a decrease in Dvorak estimates led to the JTWC downgrading Page back to a typhoon at 18:00 UTC on November 27. The storm continued to gradually deteriorate, and on November 30, the JMA downgraded Page to a severe tropical storm. Six hours later, the agency declared Page an extratropical cyclone as the storm passed over central Honshu about 130 km (80 mi) south of Osaka. However, the JTWC did not downgrade Page into a tropical storm until 12:00 UTC as wind shear continued to take toll on the system. Later that day, the JTWC issued its last warning based on a combination of land interaction with Honshu and extratropical transition. The JMA stopped tracking the extratropical remnants of Page on December 3.

== Impact ==
The typhoon dropped heavy rainfall across much of the Japanese archipelago. The highest rainfall total associated with Page was 637 mm (25.1 in) at Mount Amagi. A peak hourly rainfall total of 74 mm (2.9 in) was observed in Yamada. Meanwhile, a peak daily precipitation total of 415 mm (16.3 in) fell in Hidegadake. A wind gust of 112 km/h (70 mph) was recorded on Muroto.

Damage to Okinawa Prefecture amounted to 87.8 million yen. Ten flights and ferry service to and from Okinawa Prefecture were cancelled. Nearby, schools and public offices were closed on Minamidaitōjima. Twenty-seven flights to and from Tokushima Prefecture were cancelled. In Kagoshima Prefecture, on the southern tip of the island of Kyushu, damage amounted to 149 million yen. Approximately 600 homes in Wakayama Prefecture lost power. Across Osaka Prefecture. 562 ha (1,390 acres) of crops were damaged, amounting to 232 million yen. Four landslides damaged five roads in Kobe. Five flights to and from Oki Airport were called off. A parking lot was flooded in Hayama with 2,000 m^{3} (4,226,755 US pt) of water; four homes were flooded as a result of this. Around 18,000 homes briefly lost power in Sagamihara. In Tokyo, 61 homes were damaged and 16 were destroyed. Offshore, the vessel Panama Flag sunk, which led to the disappearance of one person.

Further north, in Mie Prefecture, where the storm made landfall, 276 homes were damaged and 9 others were demolished, which resulted in 30 people losing their homes. Damage in the prefecture was estimated at 3.38 billion yen. Strong winds downed many trees and power lines, leaving 9,600 households without electricity. One person was wounded in Chiba Prefecture. Eleven homes were damaged and four were destroyed. A total of 176 train lines were also cancelled. A 55-year-old man drowned in Saitama Prefecture. There, a total of 584 homes were damaged and 74 other houses were destroyed. Damage in Saitama Prefecture was estimated at 1.66 billion yen. Crop damage in Gunma prefecture was estimated at 128 million yen. Strong winds damaged 24 homes in Nagano Prefecture. Around 2,500 homes lost power in Niigata Prefecture. One person was injured in Fukushima Prefecture. A total of 126 homes were damaged and 17 homes were destroyed in Soma, which resulted in authorities evacuating 834 individuals. Throughout Miyagi Prefecture, 282 homes were damaged and 19 were demolished. Damage there amounted to 2.66 billion yen. Offshore Yamagata Prefecture, a 62-year-old man drowned. Ninety homes were damaged in Akita Prefecture. On the northern tip of Honshu, in Aomori Prefecture two people were injured and 82 homes suffered damage.

Typhoon Page was the sixth tropical cyclone to directly affect Japan in 1990, setting a record for the most systems to hit the country in a year; it was also the latest typhoon to hit the country, with the previous mark set by Typhoon Agnes of the 1948 Pacific typhoon season. Nationwide, four fatalities were reported and twelve others sustained injuries. Almost 170 domestic flights were cancelled. A total 162 houses were destroyed while 1,544 others were flooded. Close to 35 ha (85 acres) of farmland were damaged. Monetary damage totaled 4.8 billion yen. (Note: All currencies are converted from Japanese yen to United States Dollars using this with an exchange rate of the year 1990.) (Note: All damage totals are in 1990 values of their respective currencies.)

== See also ==
- Typhoon Hal (1985)
