= Tropical Storm Percy (1993) =

Pacific tropical storm in 1993

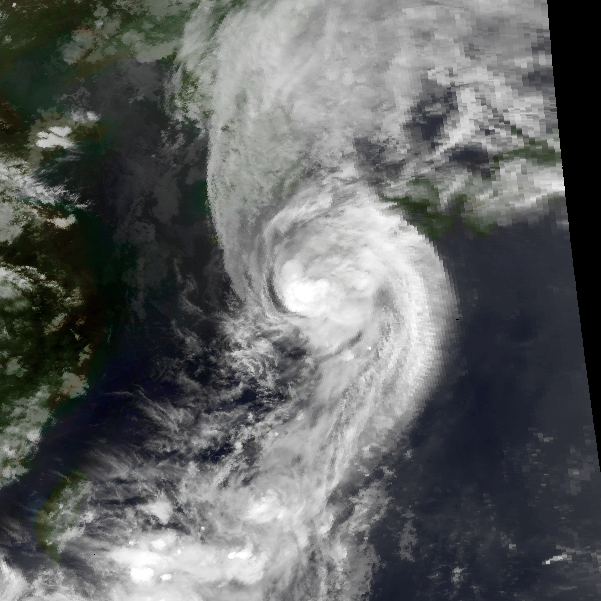
- Tropical Storm Percy near peak intensity on July 29

Meteorological history
- Formed: July 26, 1993
- Dissipated: August 1, 1993

Severe tropical storm
- 10-minute sustained (JMA)
- Highest winds: 110 km/h (70 mph)
- Lowest pressure: 975 hPa (mbar); 28.79 inHg

Category 1-equivalent typhoon
- 1-minute sustained (SSHWS/JTWC)
- Highest winds: 120 km/h (75 mph)
- Lowest pressure: 976 hPa (mbar); 28.82 inHg

Overall effects
- Damage: $35.4 million (1993 USD)
- Areas affected: Japan
- Part of the 1993 Pacific typhoon season

Tropical Storm Percy, known in the Philippines as Tropical Storm Miling, was an early-season tropical cyclone that passed through Japan during July 1993. An area of disturbed weather developed in the Philippine Sea on July 26. Gradual development ensued and on July 27, the disturbance was classified as a tropical depression. The following morning, the depression was upgraded into Tropical Storm Percy. Moving north-northwest, Percy slowly deepened and obtained its peak intensity of 115 km/h (70 mph) and a minimum barometric pressure of 975 mbar (28.79 inHg). Late on July 29, Percy passed over Kyushu and began to weaken. Percy was downgraded to a tropical depression on July 30 and dissipated completely two days later.

Across Kagoshima Prefecture, ten people suffered injuries. A total of 5,000 households lost power in Kumamoto Prefecture, with an additional 33,200 individuals losing power in Nagasaki Prefecture. Across Aichi Prefecture, 31 houses were damaged. In all, damage was estimated at 3.93 billion yen (US$35.4 million), though there were no deaths. (Note: All currencies are converted from Japanese yen to United States Dollars using this with an exchange rate of the year 1993.) (Note: All damage totals are in 1993 values of their respective currencies.)

== Meteorological history ==
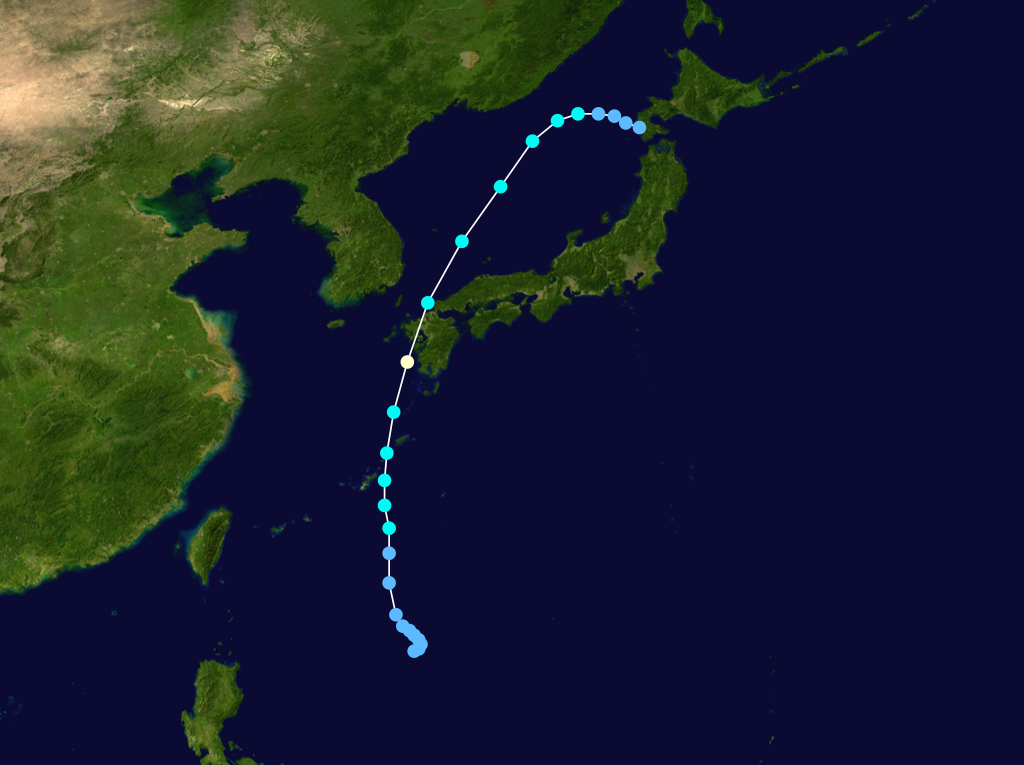
Map plotting the storm's track and intensity, according to the Saffir–Simpson scale Map key Saffir–Simpson scale Tropical depression (≤38 mph, ≤62 km/h) Tropical storm (39–73 mph, 63–118 km/h) Category 1 (74–95 mph, 119–153 km/h) Category 2 (96–110 mph, 154–177 km/h) Category 3 (111–129 mph, 178–208 km/h) Category 4 (130–156 mph, 209–251 km/h) Category 5 (≥157 mph, ≥252 km/h) Unknown Storm type Tropical cyclone Subtropical cyclone Extratropical cyclone, remnant low, tropical disturbance, or monsoon depression

Tropical Storm Percy originated from an area of persistent convection over the Philippine Sea, which separated from a large area of deep convection associated with converging monsoonal flow into Tropical Storm Ofelia, that was first noted by the Joint Typhoon Warning Center (JTWC) on July 26. Thirty hours later, an increase in thunderstorm activity prompted a Tropical Cyclone Formation Alert while the Japan Meteorological Agency (JMA) classified the system as a tropical depression. (Note: The Japan Meteorological Agency is the official Regional Specialized Meteorological Center for the western Pacific Ocean.) (Note: Wind estimates from the JMA and most other basins throughout the world are sustained over 10 minutes, while estimates from the United States-based Joint Typhoon Warning Center are sustained over 1 minute. 10-minute winds are about 1.14 times the amount of 1-minute winds.) Around this time, the Philippine Atmospheric, Geophysical and Astronomical Services Administration (PAGASA) also monitored the storm and assigned it with the local name Milling. At 18:00 UTC on July 27, the JTWC followed suit and declared the system a tropical depression, following an increase in organization. Around this time, the depression was located around 310 mi (500 km) south-southeast of Okinawa. Based on ship reports, the JTWC and the JMA each upgraded the cyclone to Tropical Storm Percy on the morning of July 28.

Following two previous tropical cyclones to the northwest, Percy tracked generally north-northwest while slowly strengthening. On the evening of July 28, the JMA declared Percy a severe tropical storm. The development of a cloud-filled eye and satellite intensity estimates of T4.0/120 km/h (75 mph) prompted the JTWC to upgrade Percy into a typhoon midday on July 29, with winds of 120 km/h (75 mph), its peak intensity. Meanwhile, the JMA estimated that Percy attained its peak wind speed of 115 km/h (70 mph) and a minimum barometric pressure of 975 mbar (28.79 inHg). Accelerating towards Japan, Percy began to weaken. That evening, the storm made landfall over Kyushu before emerging into the Sea of Japan. On July 30, the JMA downgraded Percy to a tropical depression, and several hours later, the JTWC issued its final advisory on the system, as it had dissipated over the Sea of Japan. The JMA ceased tracking the system altogether on August 1.

== Impact ==
The cyclone, along with Tropical Storms Nathan and Percy before it, dropped heavy rainfall across southern portions of the Japanese archipelago across late July and early August 1993. A total of 1,282 mm (50.5 in) occurred at Ebino, the highest across the country during this series of tropical cyclones. A peak hourly rainfall total of 82 mm (3.2 in) was observed by Lake Miike. Meanwhile, a peak daily precipitation total of 637 mm (25.1 in) fell in Asahimaru. A wind gust of 98 km/h (61 mph) was recorded in Kinugasayama. Overall, damage was estimated at 3.93 billion yen (US$35.4 million), though no fatalities were reported.

Five landslides occurred and six roads were damaged in Tokushima Prefecture. Damage in the Kochi Prefecture was less than that from Tropical Storm Ofelia. Twenty-two buses in Ehime Prefecture were cancelled, which affecting 2,100 citizens. Heavy rains from Ofelia, Percy, and Nathan caused Nagasaki City to have their wettest July on record. In Nage City in Kagoshima prefecture, strong winds partially destroyed one house and injured an individual. Offshore, a 6,466 t (7,128 short tons) ferry was titled sideways, resulting in ten injured. Crop damage in Kumamoto Prefecture reached 487 million yen and around 5,000 customers were left without power. A 47-year-old women in Nagasaki Prefecture was injured by strong winds. Around 33,200 people lost power throughout the prefecture. In Oita Prefecture, damage was estimated at 40 million yen. Damage in Saga Prefecture totaled 800 million yen. Two people were injured in Fukuoka Prefecture, where heavy rains resulted in 2.26 billion yen of damage. Two homes were destroyed in Osaka Prefecture while at the Kansai International Airport, 26 flights were cancelled. In Yamaguchi Prefecture, damage was estimated at 346 million yen. Thirteen flights were called off at the Oki Airport. Fourteen train lines were delayed for 37 minutes. Across western portions of Aichi Prefecture, thirty-one homes were damaged and one was destroyed. Due to a combination of Ofelia and Percy, eight homes were damaged in Hokkaido Prefecture.

== See also ==
- Tropical Storm Winona (1990) - similar early-season Western Pacific tropical storm
