= Cyclone Pam (1997) =

Category 2 South Pacific cyclone in 1997

Tropical Cyclone Pam
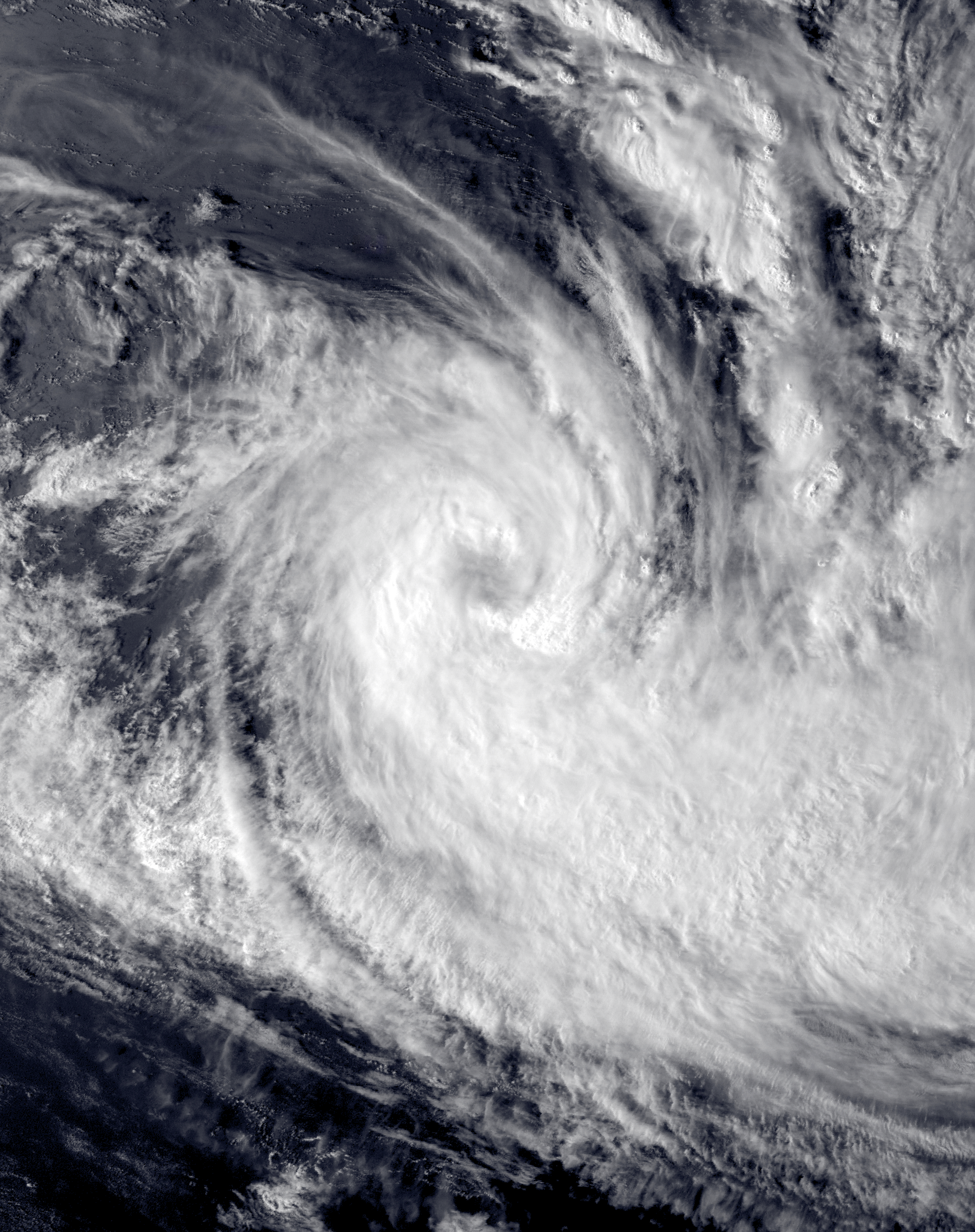
- Cyclone Pam near its peak intensity on December 8

Meteorological history
- Formed: December 5, 1997
- Extratropical: December 10, 1997
- Dissipated: December 14, 1997

Category 2 tropical cyclone
- 10-minute sustained (FMS)
- Highest winds: 110 km/h (70 mph)
- Lowest pressure: 975 hPa (mbar); 28.79 inHg

Category 1-equivalent tropical cyclone
- 1-minute sustained (SSHWS/NPMOC)
- Highest winds: 120 km/h (75 mph)

Overall effects
- Fatalities: None
- Damage: Minimal
- Areas affected: Cook Islands, French Polynesia
- IBTrACS
- Part of the 1997–98 South Pacific cyclone season

Tropical Cyclone Pam was a tropical cyclone that threatened the southern Cook Islands in December 1997. A tropical depression developed December 6, which developed slowly while drifting to the south-southeast. Forming south of Typhoon Paka, Pam steadily intensified and moved close to Suwarrow, later passing east of Palmerston Island and peaking in intensity on December 8, though the storm's minimum pressure was not recorded until much later. The cyclone passed by Rarotonga early on December 9. Pam slowly weakened and was no longer a tropical cyclone by December 10. Damage on the island was relatively minor, though heavy rain and gale-force winds were recorded. Subsequently, 400 people were evacuated.

== Meteorological history ==
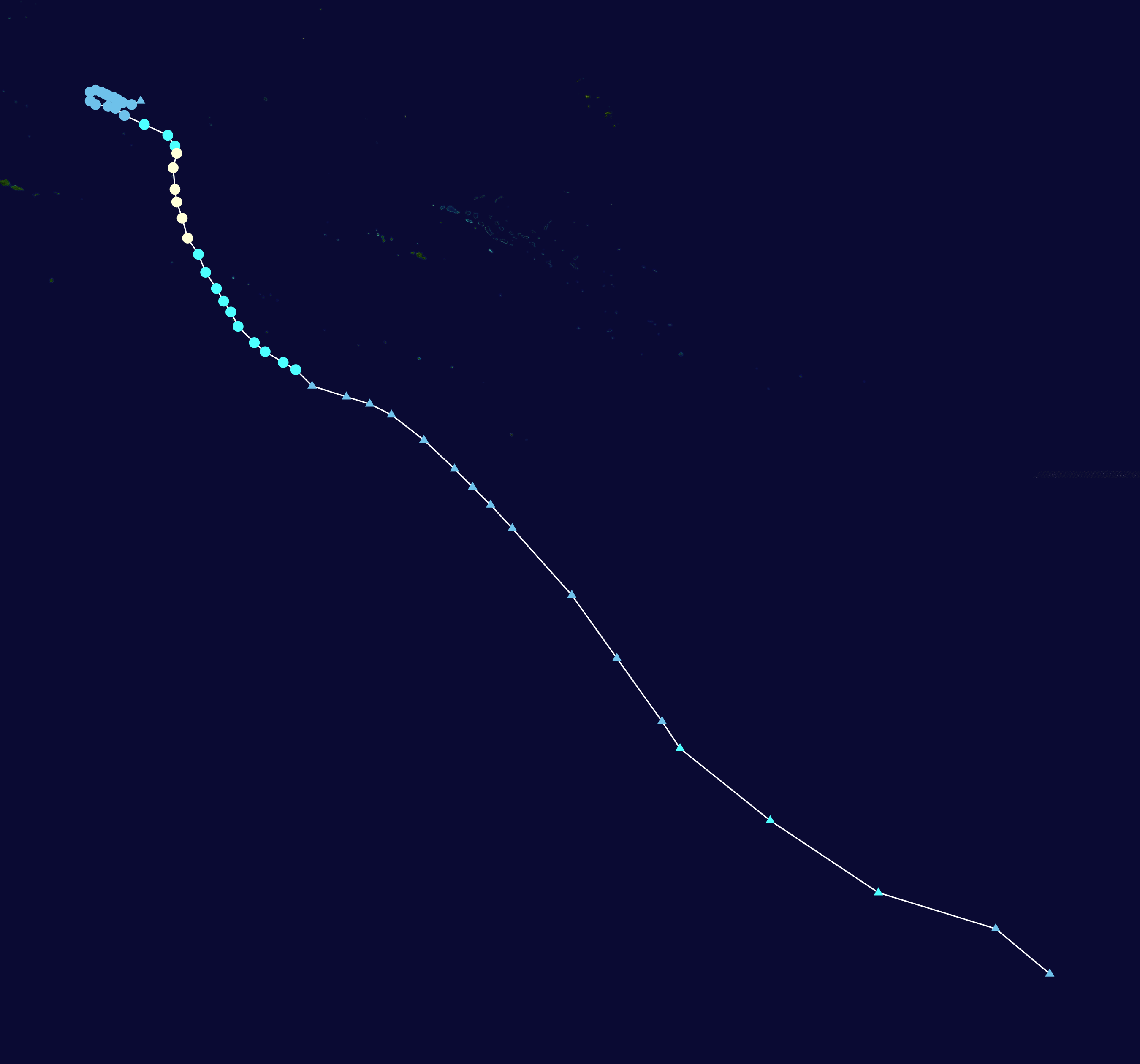
Map plotting the storm's track and intensity, according to the Saffir–Simpson scale Map key Saffir–Simpson scale Tropical depression (≤38 mph, ≤62 km/h) Tropical storm (39–73 mph, 63–118 km/h) Category 1 (74–95 mph, 119–153 km/h) Category 2 (96–110 mph, 154–177 km/h) Category 3 (111–129 mph, 178–208 km/h) Category 4 (130–156 mph, 209–251 km/h) Category 5 (≥157 mph, ≥252 km/h) Unknown Storm type Tropical cyclone Subtropical cyclone Extratropical cyclone, remnant low, tropical disturbance, or monsoon depression

Towards the end of November 1997, a westerly wind burst occurred near the equator, about 2000 km (1245 mi) to the southwest of Hawaii. This wind burst led to the development of two twin tropical disturbances to the east of the International Dateline on either side of the equator. During December 2, the system in the Northern Hemisphere was designated as a tropical depression and eventually developed into Typhoon Paka. During December 5, the Fiji Meteorological Service started to monitor the Southern Hemisphere disturbance as a tropical depression while it was located about 785 km (490 mi) to the northeast of American Samoa and about 2,100 km (1,305 mi) to the southeast of Paka. Later that day, the Naval Pacific Meteorology and Oceanography Center (NPMOC) initiated advisories on the system and classified it as Tropical Cyclone 07P after the system had become better organized. The FMS subsequently reported early the next day that the depression had developed into a Category 1 tropical cyclone on the Australian tropical cyclone intensity scale and named it Pam.

After it was named, the system continued to slowly drift to the south-southeast before starting to move quicker later that day as it passed near Suwarrow, an island of the Cook Islands. As the system passed near Suwarrow, the NPMOC reported that Pam had reached its peak intensity with 1-minute sustained wind speeds of 120 km/h (75 mph), which made it equivalent to a category 1 hurricane on the Saffir–Simpson hurricane wind scale. Over the next couple of days, the system moved south, before the FMS reported during December 8 that Pam had peaked as a category 3 severe tropical cyclone with 10-minute sustained wind-speeds of 120 km/h (75 mph). However, during the system's post analysis, the FMS reduced these winds slightly to 110 km/h (70 mph) which made Pam a category 2 tropical cyclone rather than a category 3 severe tropical cyclone on the Australian scale. On December 8, the system passed about 140 km (85 mi) to the east of Palmerston Island. It passed about 75 km (45 mi) to the southwest of Rarotonga early the next day. During December 9, Pam started to rapidly weaken as it transitioned into an extratropical cyclone, while the FMS reported during the next day that the system had degenerated into a depression. Over the next few days, the system continued to move southeastwards, before it was last noted during December 14, while located to the west of Chile.

== Preparations and impact ==
Cyclone Pam was the third tropical cyclone to affect the Cook Islands during the 1997-98 season, after Severe Tropical Cyclones Martin and Osea affected the island nation during November 1997. Ahead of the system, gale warnings were issued for various islands in both the Northern and Southern Cook Islands. On the island of Aitutaki, machinery and equipment were cleared from the seafront, while tourists were evacuated to Rarotonga.

Rarotonga recorded winds of 44 mph (71 km/h) and gusts of 74 mph (119 km/h). A total of 149 mm (5.9 in) of rain fell on the island during a six-hour period. Damage on the island was minimal, limited from downed power lines or fallen trees. A few houses lost their roofs and low-lying roads sustained flooding due to both heavy rains and rough seas. Although 400 people had to be evacuated due to coastal flooding, damage was reduced because of careful precaution prior to the storm's arrival.

As Pam weakened, it threatened French Polynesia's Austral Islands, but it caused no damage there.

== See also ==
- Tropical cyclones in 1997
