= List of named storms (T) =

Storms are named for historical reasons to avoid confusion when communicating with the public, as more than one storm can exist at a time. Names are drawn in order from predetermined lists. For tropical cyclones, names are assigned when a system has one-, three-, or ten-minute winds of more than 65 km/h (40 mph). Standards, however, vary from basin to basin. For example, some tropical depressions are named in the Western Pacific, while within the Australian and Southern Pacific regions, the naming of tropical cyclones are delayed until they have gale-force winds occurring more than halfway around the storm center.

This list covers the letter T.

== Storms ==
Note: † indicates the name was retired after that usage in the respective basin

- Tahmar (1981)† – a moderate tropical cyclone that stayed out to sea.
- Talas

- 2004 – a weak tropical storm that remained inland.
- 2011 – a storm that caused severe damage in Japan.
- 2017 – a tropical cyclone that impacted Vietnam during mid July 2017.
- 2022 – brushed the coast of Japan, claiming 3 livess.

- Taliah (2025) – a Category 3 severe tropical cyclone that stayed out to sea.
- Talim

- 2005 – a strong Category 4 super typhoon that made landfall in Taiwan and China.
- 2012 – tropical storm that affected the southern coast of China and hit Taiwan.
- 2017 – a powerful Category 4 typhoon that through the Ryukyu Islands and made landfall on Kyushu.
- 2023 – a severe tropical storm that affected Philippines and Southern China, caused widespread rains over the country.

- Tam

- 2006 – a weak tropical cyclone that caused minor damage in American Samoa.
- 2025 – a Category 1 tropical cyclone that caused minor damage in Vanuatu.

- Tammy

- 2005 – a weak tropical storm that caused flooding throughout the East Coast of the United States, killing 10 people.
- 2023 – a Category 2 hurricane that made landfall on Barbuda, then passed to the east of Bermuda.

- Tanya

- 1985 – made landfall in Queensland and then in the Northern Territory of Australia.
- 1995 – a Category 1 hurricane that meandered around the central Atlantic
- 1999 – a short-living severe tropical storm that stayed out at sea.

- Tapah

- 2002 – a weak tropical storm that slightly affected the Philippines.
- 2007 – not areas land.
- 2014 – a powerful tropical storm that remained in the open waters of the ocean.
- 2019 – a storm that caused widespread rains and flooding in the Philippines.
- 2025 – a Category 1 typhoon which affected Hong Kong, Macau, and South China.

- Tara

- 1961 – a catastrophic Category 1 hurricane.
- 1968 – never threatened land.
- 1982 – never threatened land.
- 2018 – brushed southwestern Mexico.

- Tasha

- 1990 – a severe tropical storm that caused flooding in southern China east of Hong Kong, resulting in 103 fatalities.
- 1993 – a Category 1 typhoon that hit east of Leizhou Peninsula in China.
- 2010† – a weak tropical cyclone that was short-lived but exacerbated widespread floods in Queensland, Australia, causing devastation.

- Tauktae (2021) – an extremely severe cyclonic storm was devastating landfall in Gujarat.
- Ted

- 1976† – made landfall in Queensland, causing 2 fatalities and incurring $49 million worth of damages.
- 1992 – affected Luzon, southern Taiwan, eastern China, and South Korea, killing 61.
- 1995 – crossed the Philippines as a tropical low before striking southern China as a Category 1-equivalent typhoon.

- Teddy (2020) – a Category 4 hurricane that affected both Bermuda and Atlantic Canada as a strong Category 1 hurricane and strong post-tropical cyclone, respectively.
- Tej (2023) – a tropical cyclone that formed over the central-south Arabian Sea and made landfall on Socotra and Yemen.
- Tembin

- 2000 – was not a threat to land while tropical.
- 2005 – a weak tropical storm that once crossed the Philippines, it dissipated quickly.
- 2012 – unusually approached Taiwan twice, first as a strong typhoon and second as a Category 2 typhoon.
- 2017† – devastated southern Philippines, killing over 266 people.

- Teratai (2021) – a weak Category 1 tropical cyclone which slightly affected Indonesia and Christmas Island.
- Teresa

- 1994 – a Category 1 typhoon that struck the Philippines and Vietnam.
- 2021 – a weak and disorganized storm that stayed at sea.

- Tering

- 1974 – struck the Philippines.
- 1978 – a tropical depression that affected the Philippines.
- 1982 – struck Japan as a Category 1 typhoon.
- 1986 – hit the Philippines.
- 1990 – A super typhoon that did not affect land.
- 1994 – A tropical depression that was not tracked by the JMA.

- Terri (2001) – made landfall in the Pilbara region of Western Australia.
- Terry

- 1976 – struck Madagascar and then hit the east coast of Mozambique and South Africa.
- 1985 – a moderate Category 3 hurricane that churned in the open ocean.
- 2021 – formed at an unusually low latitude while staying at sea.

- Tess

- 1945 – a Category 1 typhoon that made landfall in southern China.
- 1953 – struck the Central Honshū Island in Japan. 393 people were killed and 85 were missing.
- 1958 – a category 1 typhoon that only slightly affected the Ryukyu Islands.
- 1961 – a powerful category 4 typhoon that remained in the open ocean.
- 1964 – a powerful category 2 typhoon that remained in the open ocean.
- 1966 – a Category 2 typhoon hitting China.
- 1969 – a Category 1 typhoon that hit the Philippines and Vietnam.
- 1972 – caused strong flooding and strong surf killed 29 people, with 20 missing.
- 1975 – a category 2 typhoon that remained in the open ocean.
- 1978 – a powerful tropical storm that remained in open waters.
- 1982 – a weak tropical storm that affected China and Taiwan.
- 1985 – a powerful Category 1 typhoon hits Philippines and Taiwan.
- 1988 – was the second of three tropical cyclones to directly impact the Philippines in a two-week time frame in 1988.

- Tessa (1977) – caused significant precipitation over the islands, with the Puka Puka weather station recording a 24-hour rainfall total of 154.2 mm (6.07 in).
- Tessi (2000)† – a severe tropical cyclone that caused extensive damage along the coast of North Queensland in 2000.
- Thad

- 1981 – struck Japan; one of the most damaging tropical cyclones in Japanese history
- 1984 – a Category 4 typhoon that stayed out at sea.
- 1988 – approached the Philippines but turned away

- Thane (2011) – was the strongest tropical cyclone of 2011 within the Bay of Bengal.
- Thelma

- 1951 – a Category 4 typhoon that was the strongest typhoons in the season, but did not affect the land.
- 1956 – a Category 5 typhoon that struck Philippines as a Category 2 typhoon in April.
- 1959 – a short lived tropical depression that was analyzed by JTWC as tropical storm.
- 1962 – a Category 4 typhoon that was formed from a fractured portion of a westerlies surge, later go on to affect Japan.
- 1965 – a short lived tropical storm that was analyzed by JMA as tropical depression.
- 1967 – a weak tropical storm that was formed in North Pacific Ocean, later would become a strong extratropical cyclone near Alaska.
- 1971 – a tropical storm that made a loop to the east of Philippines in March.
- 1973 – a tropical storm that struck southern Vietnam and dissipated in Gulf of Thailand.
- 1977 – a Category 2 typhoon that brought destruction in southern Taiwan.
- 1980 – a tropical storm that was formed and stayed in the open sea.
- 1983 – a tropical storm that was the last named tropical cyclone of the 1983 Pacific typhoon season.
- 1987 – a Category 4 typhoon that was the first super typhoon of the 1987 Pacific typhoon season.
- 1991† – a tropical storm that overwhelmed Anilao–Malbasag watershed, causing devastation Ormoc City in Philippines with 4,922 deaths. 192 people were killed across Leyte and Negros Occidental, and 1,941–3,084 were missing and presumed dead, making Thelma deadliest Philippine tropical cyclone history until surpassed by Haiyan in 2013.
- 1998† – a Category 5 severe tropical cyclone that was the first Category 5 severe tropical cyclone observed in Timor Sea, and was the most intense tropical cyclone to threaten Darwin since Tracy.

- Theodore (1994)† – a Category 5 severe tropical cyclone that affected New Caledonia and Vanuatu.
- Therese

- 1967 – a strong severe tropical storm that never impacted land.
- 1970 – a weak tropical storm that stayed out at open sea.
- 1972 – a Category 3-equivalent typhoon, killed 90 people in the Philippines and Vietnam.
- 1976 – a Category 4 typhoon that affected South Japan.

- Three

- 1891 – a Category 3 hurricane that made landfall in Martinique.
- 1935 – a Category 5 hurricane that made landfall in Florida with the lowest recorded barometric pressure in the United States.
- 1940 – a Category 2 hurricane that made landfall in the South Carolina and Georgia Coast.

- Theta (2020) – a strong tropical storm that affected Madeira Island.
- Tia

- 1980 – a Category 2 tropical cyclone that affected Fiji and Tonga.
- 1991† – a Category 3 severe tropical cyclone the first of six tropical cyclones to affect Vanuatu.

- Tico (1989) – a powerful major hurricane that made landfall in Mazatlán.
- Tiffany

- 1986 – Category 2 tropical cyclone (Australian scale), remained away from land in the Indian Ocean.
- 1998 – Category 4 severe tropical cyclone (Australian scale), formed west of the Australian coast and moved out to sea.
- 2022 – Category 2 tropical cyclone (Australian scale), made landfall over Northern Queensland, crossed the Gulf of Carpentaria, then made landfall over the Northern Territory.

- Tilda

- 1954 - A Category 4 that affected the Philippines.
- 1959 - A strong typhoon that never impacted land.
- 1961 - One of many category 5s in the 1961 Pacific Typhoon Season.
- 1964† - A moderate typhoon that meandered in the South China Sea.

- Tim

- 1984 – a strong tropical cyclone that never affected land.
- 1991 – never affected land.
- 1994 (March) – a very small weak tropical cyclone that never affected land.
- 1994 (July) – a powerful category 4 typhoon made landfall Taiwan and East China.
- 2005 – a weak tropical cyclone that never affected land.
- 2013 – a weak tropical cyclone minor damage was also sustained at the Willis

- Tina

- 1974† – formed in late April.
- 1990† – crossed western Australia.
- 1992 – second longest-lived Eastern Pacific hurricane
- 1997 – a Category 2 typhoon that affected the Ryukyu Islands and South Korea.
- 2016 – a short-lived, weak tropical storm.

- Tingting (2004)† – a destructive tropical cyclone that produced record-breaking rains in Guam.
- Tino

- 2009 – a tropical depression that affected eastern Philippines.
- 2013 – a Category 4 typhoon that later struck Japan.
- 2017 – a tropical storm that affected the Philippines.
- 2020† – a Category 2 tropical cyclone that caused significant damage across ten island nations in the South Pacific Ocean.
- 2025† – a deadly and destructive typhoon that heavily impacted Visayas in the Philippines, and later in Central Vietnam.

- Tip

- 1979 – a Category 5 super typhoon that was the largest and most intense tropical cyclone ever recorded.
- 1983 – a Category 1 typhoon that affected Hong Kong.
- 1986 – a Category 1 typhoon that stayed out at sea.
- 1989 – a minimal tropical storm that remained well out at sea in September 1989.

- Tisoy

- 2003 – a Category 4 typhoon that stayed out at open sea.
- 2019† – struck the Philippines as a Category 4 typhoon, killing a total of 17 people.

- Titli (2018) – a deadly and destructive tropical cyclone that caused extensive damage to Eastern India in October 2018.
- Todd (1998) – a Category 4 super typhoon that mainly affected southern Japan.
- Tokage

- 2004 – the deadliest typhoon to strike Japan since Typhoon Bess in 1982.
- 2011 – not affect.
- 2016 – a Category 1 typhoon hits Philippines.
- 2022 – remained out at sea.

- Tom

- 1977 – a Category 2 tropical cyclone that minimal affected Solomon Islands.
- 1996 – a Category 1 typhoon that did not affect land.

- Tomas

- 1994 – Category 3 tropical cyclone, remained over the open ocean.
- 2006 – a weak tropical storm; the final storm of the 2006 typhoon season.
- 2010 (March)† – Category 4 tropical cyclone, caused extensive damage in Fiji.
- 2010 (October)† – a Category 2 hurricane that made the latest recorded landfall on Windward Islands and caused flooding in Haiti that intensified the cholera outbreak in the wake of earthquake earlier that year.
- 2018 – a Category 2 typhoon that made an anticyclonic loop because of weather systems late that season.

- Tony

- 1979 – A strong tropical cyclone that did not affect land.
- 2012 – a tropical storm that came from the tropical wave that also spawned Hurricane Sandy.

- Tonyo

- 2004 – struck Taiwan as a Category 3 typhoon.
- 2008 – a tropical storm that affected Vietnam.
- 2020 – a tropical storm that affected the Philippines and Vietnam.

- Toraji

- 2001 – impacted Taiwan and China, killing at least 72.
- 2007 – struck Vietnam.
- 2014 – struck Japan.
- 2018 – a weak system that struck Vietnam.
- 2024† – struck the Northern Philippines

- Toyang

- 1964 – affected the Philippines and Hainan.
- 1968 – a Category 4 equivalent typhoon that made landfall in the Philippines as a category 1 equivalent typhoon.
- 1972 – struck Hong Kong as a category 3 equivalent typhoon, killing one person.
- 1975 – meandered over the South China Sea and struck South China.
- 1980 – sank the MV Derbyshire.
- 1984 – one of the most intense typhoons on record.
- 1988 – also affected the Philippines and Hainan.
- 1996 – traversed the Philippines.
- 2000 – brought deadly flooding to the central and southern Philippines.

- Tracy (1974)† – a Category 4 severe tropical cyclone that destroyed Darwin as well as the smallest tropical cyclone on record until 2008.
- Trami

- 2001 – impacted Taiwan before crossing the island and dissipating in the strait as a depression.
- 2006 – not a threat to land.
- 2013 – caused flooding in the Philippines.
- 2018 – a Category 5 super typhoon which affected Taiwan and Japan in mid-September.
- 2024† – a deadly high-end tropical storm which affected the Philippines, Vietnam and Thailand.

- Trases (2022) – struck the mainland of South Korea.
- Trevor (2019)† – a severe tropical cyclone that caused major damage across Papua New Guinea, Northern Territory and Queensland.
- Trina (2001)† – a weak but destructive tropical cyclone in late 2001 which caused some of the worst flooding in the South Pacific island of Mangaia, Cook Islands, in nearly 50 years.
- Trining

- 1963 – was rated a typhoon by the JMA.
- 1967 – a Category 5-equivalent typhoon, Carla caused significant rainfall in the Philippines and Taiwan, killing 250 with 30 missing.
- 1971 – made landfall on the Korean Peninsula.
- 1979
- 1983 – affected the Philippines and Vietnam.
- 1987 – sank a ferry boat carrying 50 people; 10 deaths and 13 missing.
- 1991 – a Category 5 super typhoon that weakened before landfall on Luzon.
- 1995 – curved away from the Philippines.
- 1999 – remained out at sea.

- Trix

- 1952 – a Category 4 typhoon that devastated Bicol Region in Philippines killing 995 people, and as such was the 10th deadliest Philippine typhoon on the record.
- 1957 – a Category 4 typhoon that made a sharp recurve to the east and would dissipate just over the International Date Line.
- 1960 – a Category 4 typhoon that made a sharp turn to the south-west and hit northwestern Taiwan one week after Shirley causing more floods and four deaths.
- 1963 – a Category 1 typhoon that made landfall as a tropical storm on Philippines and China in quick fashion.
- 1965 – a Category 4 super typhoon that affected Japan just days after Shirley, killing 98 people and 9 were missing.
- 1968 – a strong tropical storm that affected Kyūshū and Shikoku after a loop, killing 25 people.
- 1971 – a Category 3 typhoon that affected much of Japan's southern coasts in most of its lifetime, causing 44 deaths and $50.6 million in damage.
- 1974 – a weak tropical storm that made landfall east of Leizhou Peninsula, China.
- 1978 – a Category 1 typhoon that made a loop in the middle of northwestern Pacific Ocean.

- Trixi (2016) – a rare Mediterranean tropical-like cyclone
- Trixie (1975) – a strong tropical cyclone that brought the second highest wind gust to the Australian mainland.
- Trudy

- 1978 – a Category 4 severe tropical cyclone that minimal affected East Timor and Indonesia.
- 1990 – a Category 4 hurricane that churned in the open ocean.
- 2014 – a short-lived tropical storm that made landfall in Mexico.
- 2026 – a Category 3 hurricane that approached the Mexican coast without making landfall.

- Tui (1998)† – a weak tropical cyclone that affected American Samoa.
- Tuni (2015) – a weak tropical cyclone that slightly affected American Samoa.
- Tusi (1987)† – a tropical cyclone which affected the island nations of Tuvalu, Tokelau, Western Samoa, American Samoa, Niue and the Southern Cook Islands during January 1987.

== See also ==
- European windstorm names
- Atlantic hurricane season
- Pacific hurricane season
- Tropical cyclone naming
- South Atlantic tropical cyclone
- Tropical cyclone
