= Tilda =

Tilda or TILDA may refer to:

- Tilda, a variant of the female given name Matilda
- Tilda (food manufacturer), British food brand specializing in rice
- Tilda (software), GTK terminal emulator
- Tilda Johnson, the secret identity of Nightshade
- Tilda Newra, municipality near Raipur City, India
- Tilda Swinton (born 1960), British actress
- Tilda Thamar (1921–1989), Argentine actress
- The Irish Longitudinal Study on Ageing (TILDA)
- List of storms named Tilda
