= List of storms named Tess =

The name Tess has been used for thirteen tropical cyclones in the northwest Pacific Ocean.

- Typhoon Tess (1945)
- Typhoon Tess (1953) (T5313) – struck Japan (ja)
- Typhoon Tess (1958) (T5808)
- Typhoon Tess (1961) (T6102, 05W)
- Typhoon Tess (1964) (T6401, 01W, Asiang)
- Typhoon Tess (1966) (T6613, 12W)
- Typhoon Tess (1969) (T6904, 04W, Kuring)
- Typhoon Tess (1972) (T7209, 10W) – struck Japan
- Typhoon Tess (1975) (T7508, 10W)
- Tropical Storm Tess (1978) (T7828, 31W)
- Tropical Storm Tess (1982) (T8206, 06W) – Joint Typhoon Warning Center analyzed Tess and Val (08W, Deling) as two different systems, while Japan Meteorological Agency analyzed them as one tropical storm (T8206 Tess/Val)
- Typhoon Tess (1985) (T8516, 15W, Miling)
- Tropical Storm Tess (1988) (T8830, 25W, Welpring)
