= List of storms named Ted =

The name Ted has been used for three tropical cyclones worldwide: two in the West Pacific Ocean and one in the Australian region.

In the West Pacific:

- Severe Tropical Storm Ted (1992) (T9219, 19W, Maring) – affected Luzon, southern Taiwan, eastern China, and South Korea, killing 61.
- Severe Tropical Storm Ted (1995) (T9516, 24W) – crossed the Philippines as a tropical low before striking southern China as a Category 1-equivalent typhoon.

In the Australian region:

- Cyclone Ted (1976) – made landfall in Queensland, causing 2 fatalities and incurring $49 million worth of damages.

== See also ==
Storms with similar names

- Hurricane Teddy (2020) – a Category 4 Atlantic Ocean hurricane that became the earliest 19th named storm of an Atlantic hurricane season.
- Cyclone Theodore (1994) – a Category 5 Australian region severe tropical cyclone that crossed into the South Pacific Ocean.
