= List of storms named Trix =

The name Trix has been used to name nine tropical cyclones in the northwestern Pacific Ocean.

- Typhoon Trix (1952)
- Typhoon Trix (1957)
- Typhoon Trix (1960)
- Typhoon Trix (1963)
- Typhoon Trix (1965)
- Tropical Storm Trix (1968)
- Typhoon Trix (1971)
- Tropical Storm Trix (1974)
- Typhoon Trix (1978)
