= List of storms named Tim =

The name Tim has been used for two tropical cyclones in the West Pacific Ocean and four in the Australian region.

In the West Pacific:

- Typhoon Tim (1991) (T9102, 02W) – never affected land.
- Typhoon Tim (1994) (T9405, 08W, Iliang) – a powerful category 4 typhoon that made landfall in Taiwan and East China.

In the Australian region:

- Cyclone Tim (1984) – a strong tropical cyclone that never affected land.
- Cyclone Tim (1994) – a very small and weak tropical cyclone that never affected land.
- Cyclone Tim (2005) – a weak tropical cyclone that never affected land.
- Cyclone Tim (2013) – a weak tropical cyclone that did minor damage in Willis Island.
