= List of storms named Tasha =

Tropical Storm Tasha may refer to:

Western Pacific Ocean:

- Tropical Storm Tasha (1990)
- Typhoon Tasha (1993)

Australian Region:

- Cyclone Tasha – a weak tropical cyclone that was short-lived but exacerbated widespread floods in Queensland, Australia, causing devastation.
