= List of storms named Therese =

The name Therese has been used for four tropical cyclones in the West Pacific Ocean and one European windstorm.

In the West Pacific:

- Tropical Storm Therese (1967) (T6702, 03W) – a strong severe tropical storm that never impacted land.
- Tropical Storm Therese (1970) (T7007, 08W) – a weak tropical storm that stayed out at open sea.
- Typhoon Therese (1972) (T7229, 36W, Undang) – a Category 3-equivalent typhoon, killed 90 people in the Philippines and Vietnam.
- Typhoon Therese (1976) (T7609, 09W) – a Category 4 typhoon that affected South Japan.

In Europe:

- Storm Therese (2026) – affected the Canary Islands.
