= List of storms named Thad =

The name Thad has been used for three tropical cyclones in the Western Pacific Ocean:

- Typhoon Thad (1981) – struck Japan; one of the most damaging tropical cyclones in Japanese history
- Typhoon Thad (1984) – did not affect land
- Typhoon Thad (1988) – approached the Philippines but turned away
