= List of storms named Tiffany =

The name Tiffany has been used for three tropical cyclones in the Australian region of the Southern Hemisphere.

- Cyclone Tiffany (1986) – Category 2 tropical cyclone (Australian scale), remained away from land in the Indian Ocean.
- Cyclone Tiffany (1998) – Category 4 severe tropical cyclone (Australian scale), formed west of the Australian coast and moved out to sea.
- Cyclone Tiffany (2022) – Category 2 tropical cyclone (Australian scale), made landfall over Northern Queensland, crossed the Gulf of Carpentaria, then made landfall over the Northern Territory.
