= Typhoon Tess =

Pacific typhoon in 1953

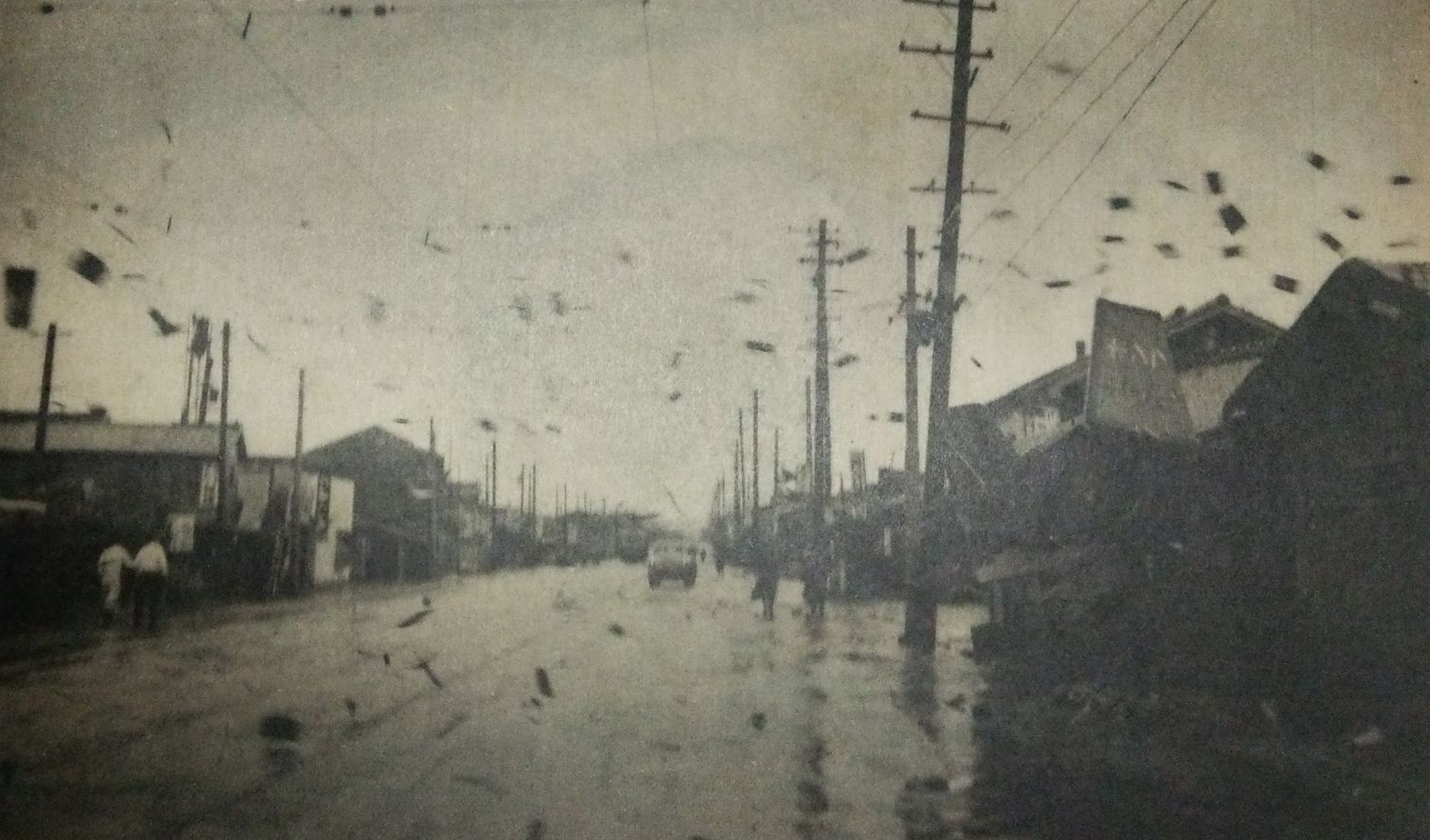
- Floods in Japan created by Typhoon Tess.

Meteorological history
- Formed: September 17, 1953
- Dissipated: September 27, 1953

Unknown-strength storm
- 10-minute sustained (JMA)
- Lowest pressure: 900 hPa (mbar); 26.58 inHg

Category 5-equivalent super typhoon
- 1-minute sustained (SSHWS/JTWC)
- Highest winds: 280 km/h (175 mph)

Overall effects
- Fatalities: 393
- Missing: 85
- Areas affected: Japan
- IBTrACS
- Part of the 1953 Pacific typhoon season

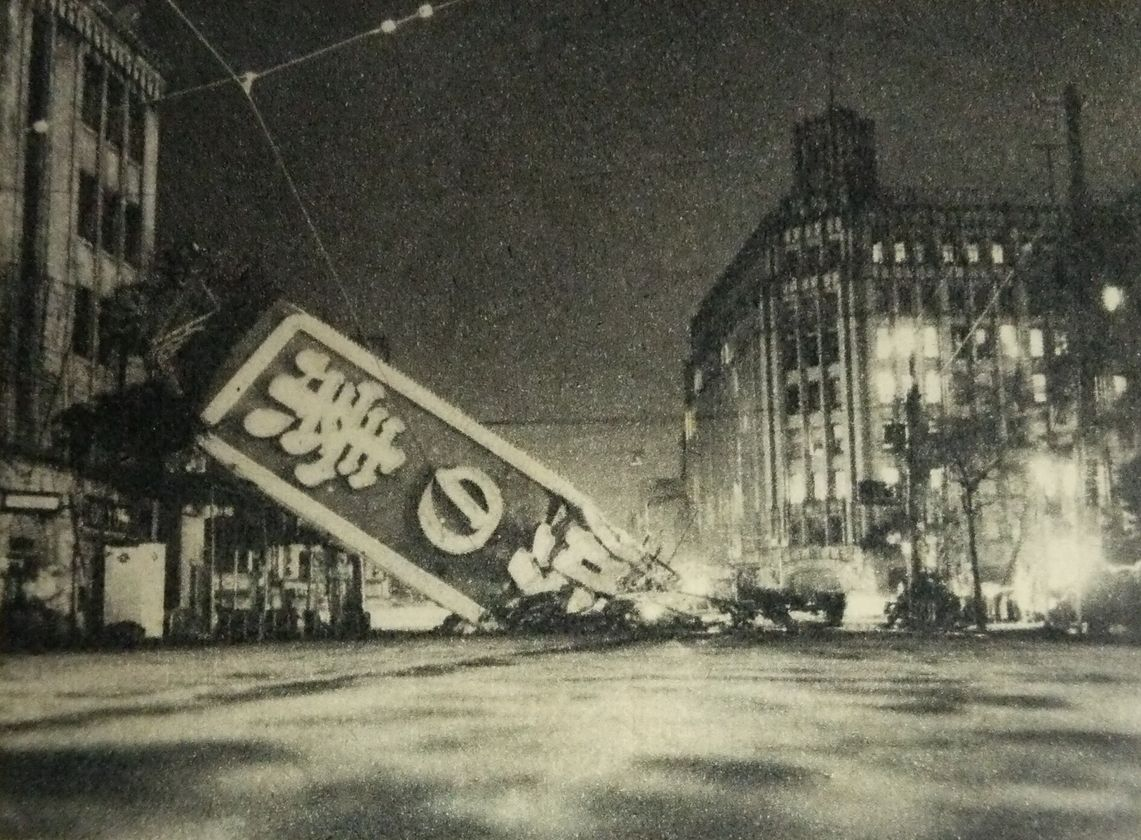
Destruction created by Typhoon Tess in the Sukiyabashi Closing.

Typhoon Tess, known in Japan as Typhoon No. 13, was a typhoon that caused great damage to Japan (especially the Kinki region) in September 1953 while Japan was still in the middle of post-war recovery. A depression formed in the Caroline Islands, moving northwest over the following days, the storm then rapidly enlarged, becoming a category-5 equivalent typhoon. Tess then crossed the Shima peninsula and made landfall over Japan. The storm then weakened and dissipated over September 29.

393 people were killed because of Tess, with 85 people missing. After the storm, a total of 86,398 houses were destroyed, 318,657 hectares of agricultural fields were damaged, and there were 5,582 damaged ships.

== Meteorological history ==
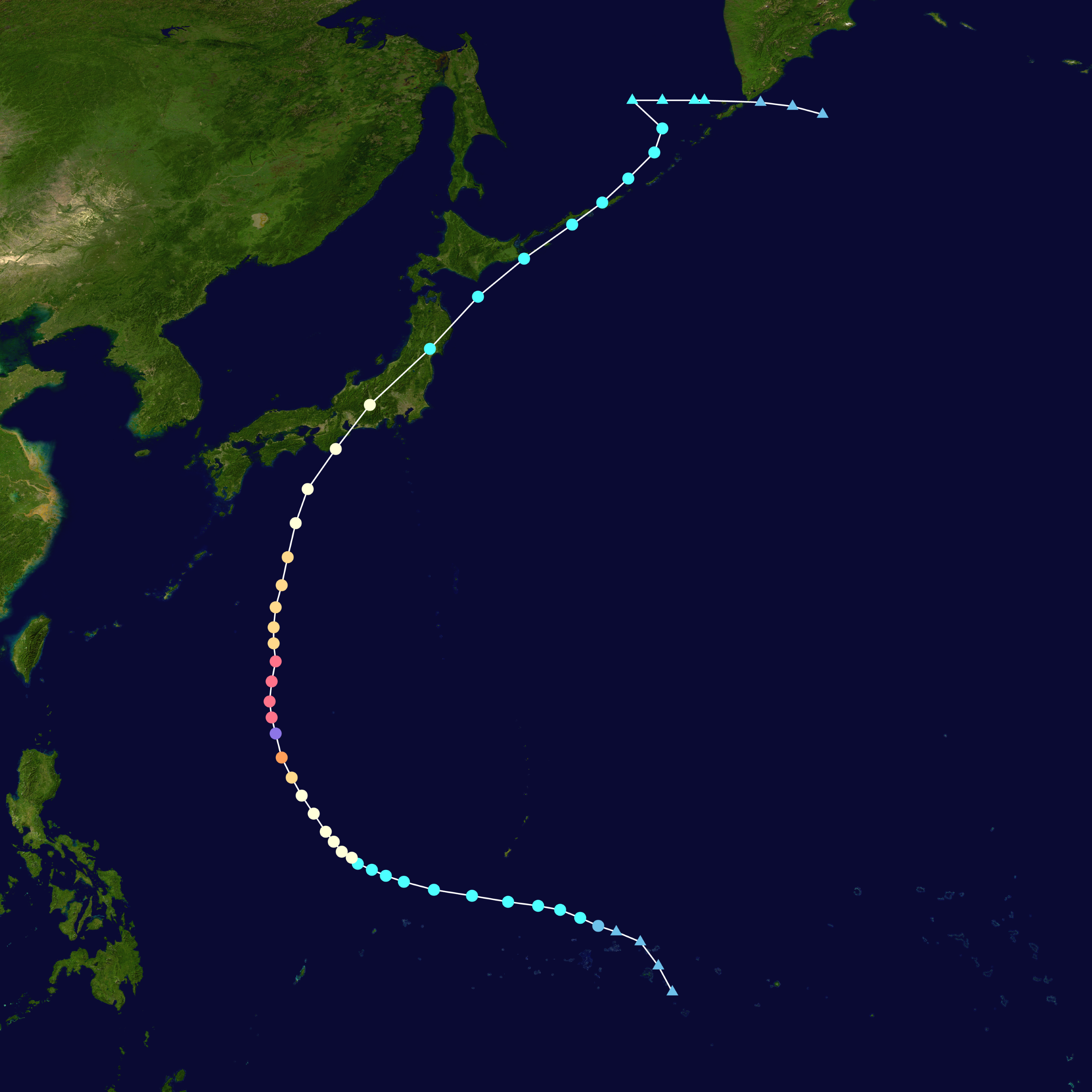
Map plotting the storm's track and intensity, according to the Saffir–Simpson scale Map key Saffir–Simpson scale Tropical depression (≤38 mph, ≤62 km/h) Tropical storm (39–73 mph, 63–118 km/h) Category 1 (74–95 mph, 119–153 km/h) Category 2 (96–110 mph, 154–177 km/h) Category 3 (111–129 mph, 178–208 km/h) Category 4 (130–156 mph, 209–251 km/h) Category 5 (≥157 mph, ≥252 km/h) Unknown Storm type Tropical cyclone Subtropical cyclone Extratropical cyclone, remnant low, tropical disturbance, or monsoon depression

On September 16, a weak tropical cyclone formed in the eastern Caroline Islands. The cyclone moved northwest over the following days, with no wind increase. In September 19, the typhoon relatively enlarged, with a speed of 50 miles per hour (80 kilometres per hour). It remained relatively weak until around the September 21, but on the 22nd it strengthened rapidly, with a wind speed of 135 mph (217 km/h) recorded in the US.

The pressure of Typhoon Tess was 993 millibars (29.3 inHg) at 9:00 (JST) on the same day and dropped to 900mb at 15:00 JST. This pressure drop corresponds to the largest of Pacific typhoons since 1951. Over the following days, Tess weakened, moving northeast. Tess finally crossed the Shima Peninsula and made landfall to Aichi Prefecture on the September 25, then swerving at the last hour, barely missing Tokyo. The storm then weakened into an extratropical cyclone on September 27 and dissipated on September 29, just south of the Korean Peninsula.

== Preparations and impact ==
Major flooding was spotted in the Mukojima Islands, Uji, Kumiyama, Kyoto, and other nearby areas. In response to the typhoon, the United States set up shelter to help Japan recover from the typhoon, killing one American. Americans also reported at the United States Air Force Base in Itami, experiencing strong winds and high floods. The Contra Costa Times called the storm was a "furious, drunken woman in the lobby of a hotel". In a city near Osaka, one-third of the city was flooded. Eventually, soldiers were told to be evacuated. In addition, the Yodo River overflowed, flooding 5,000 homes, from which most of them were flooded up to the second floor.

The storm broke all telephone lines from the areas of Tokyo, Osaka, Kobe, and Kyoto. 281 bridges were washed out and 21 railroads were dismantled. In addition, all flights from Japan were cancelled by the storm. The number of people killed by Tess was 393, while 85 were missing. Japan suffered some large-scale disasters with more than 1,000 of casualties. When compared to the June 1953 North Kyushu flood and Wakayama flood, the damage caused by Typhoon Tess was relatively mild but still destructive, with 86,398 houses are destroyed, 495,875 flooded houses, 318,657 hectares of damaged agricultural fields and 5,582 damaged ships. 6,000 people had also been evacuated, with 167 people injured, and 180 missing on September 28. When the storm hit Kyoto, the storm deeply affected agricultural farming in the region. Ending with 55.6 million Japanese Yen (1953) (US$386,000).

== Aftermath ==
In the Osaka-Kobe Industrial Area, police personnel and volunteers helped rescue people, with construction gangs quickly building construction dikes to help lower floods. Military personnel were advised to take shelter because of the storm. Telephone lines were eventually fixed as workers worked daily. The storm was considered as the worst storm since the 1934 Muroto typhoon, which caused 2,702 fatalities.

=== The Coast Act ===
Storm surge damages caused by a large number of typhoons were interfering with Japan's post-war recovery, especially Typhoon Tess of 1953. The history of Japan's modern typhoon-induced coastal disaster prevention works began with Typhoon Tess and led to the enactment of the Coast Act in 1956.

== See also ==
- 1953 Pacific typhoon season
