= List of storms named Tam =

The name Tam has been used for two tropical cyclones in the South Pacific Ocean:

- Cyclone Tam (2006) – a weak tropical cyclone that caused minor damage in American Samoa.
- Cyclone Tam (2025) – a Category 1 tropical cyclone that caused minor damage in Vanuatu.
