= 1953 Wakayama flood =

Deadly flooding in Wakayama Prefecture, Japan in 1953

The 1953 Wakayama flood (Japanese: 紀州大水害 / 南紀豪雨) was caused by heavy rain that resulted in landslides and flooding in the Kii Peninsula, Wakayama Prefecture in Japan around 18 July 1953. Collapse of the dikes occurred along many rivers, which caused flooding. It resulted in the death of 713 people and 411 people going missing.
