= Typhoon Thad =

Pacific typhoon in 1981

Typhoon Thad (Openg)
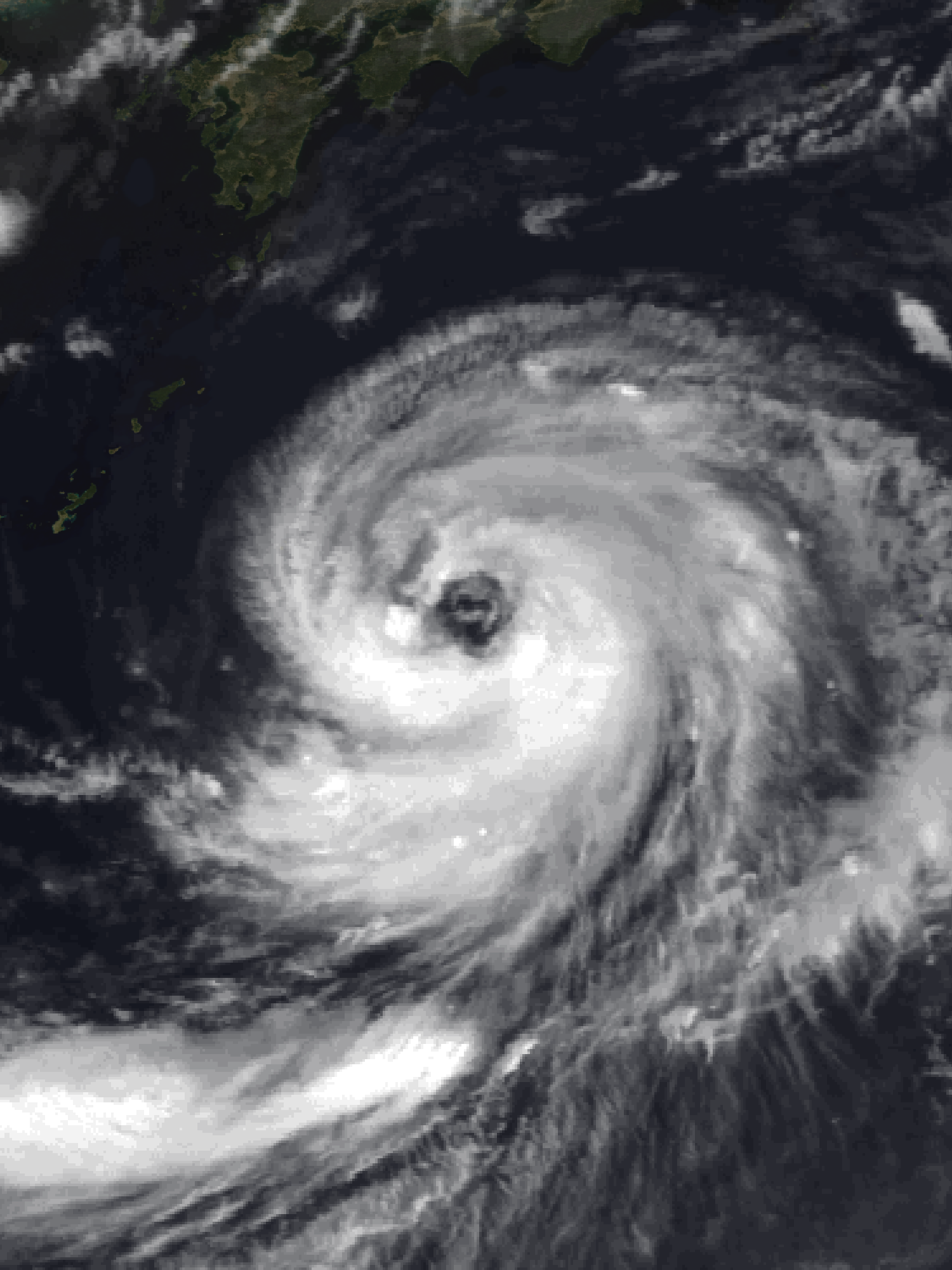
- Thad on August 19

Meteorological history
- Formed: August 15, 1981
- Dissipated: August 25, 1981

Typhoon
- 10-minute sustained (JMA)
- Highest winds: 130 km/h (80 mph)
- Lowest pressure: 955 hPa (mbar); 28.20 inHg

Category 2-equivalent typhoon
- 1-minute sustained (SSHWS/JTWC)
- Highest winds: 155 km/h (100 mph)
- Lowest pressure: 956 hPa (mbar); 28.23 inHg

Overall effects
- Fatalities: 43 total
- Damage: $1.03 billion (1981 USD)
- Areas affected: Japan
- IBTrACS
- Part of the 1981 Pacific typhoon season

Typhoon Thad, known in the Philippines as Typhoon Openg, was considered the worst storm to affect Japan in two years. Originating from a monsoon trough, Typhoon Thad was first classified on August 15, 1981 and was upgraded into a tropical storm the next day. Meanwhile, Thad moved north and northeast and attained typhoon intensity midday on August 18. The next day, the storm reached its peak intensity of 80 mph (130 km/h). On August 22, Thad accelerated northward, striking eastern Japan the next day just before weakening to a tropical storm. After passing through the country, the cyclone transitioned into an extratropical cyclone on August 23.

Forty-one persons perished in Japan due to the typhoon and 173 others were hurt. Thad flooded 31,082 houses and demolished 4,401 others. Roughly 27,000 people were left homeless because of Thad. Moreover, 111,500 homeowners were without power during the height of the storm. Furthermore, the storm also destroyed 449 roads, and was responsible for 499 landslides. The cyclone inundated 417,400 acres (168,900 hectares) of farm land. Train service was interrupted in 22 lines.

== Meteorological history ==
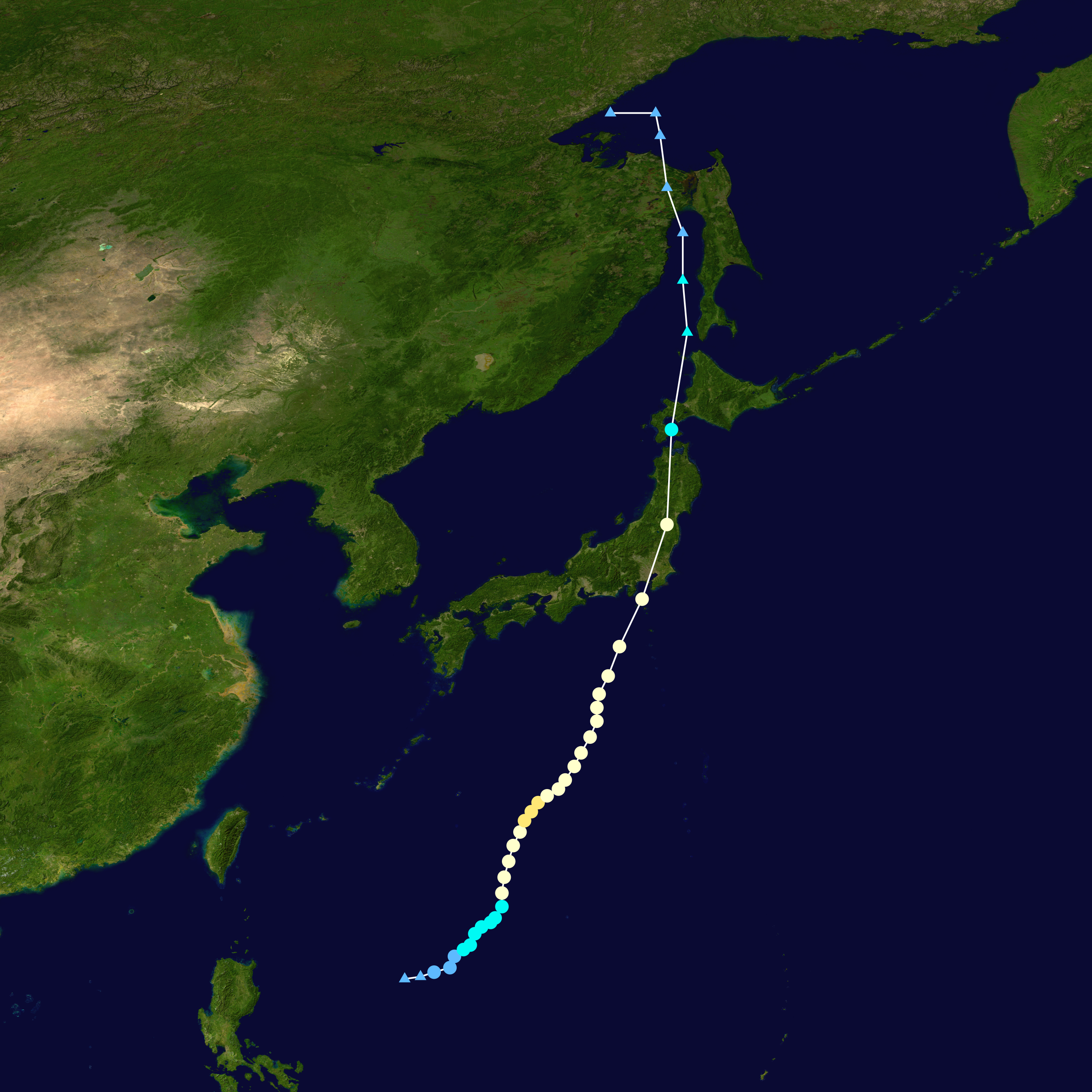
Map plotting the storm's track and intensity, according to the Saffir–Simpson scale Map key Saffir–Simpson scale Tropical depression (≤38 mph, ≤62 km/h) Tropical storm (39–73 mph, 63–118 km/h) Category 1 (74–95 mph, 119–153 km/h) Category 2 (96–110 mph, 154–177 km/h) Category 3 (111–129 mph, 178–208 km/h) Category 4 (130–156 mph, 209–251 km/h) Category 5 (≥157 mph, ≥252 km/h) Unknown Storm type Tropical cyclone Subtropical cyclone Extratropical cyclone, remnant low, tropical disturbance, or monsoon depression

Typhoon Thad originated from an active monsoon trough several hundred miles east of the Philippines in mid-August 1981. On August 10, a weak surface circulation was first noted on satellite imagery. At that time, the center was embedded within the monsoon trough. Within five days, the system developed outflow. Midday on August 15, the Japan Meteorological Agency (JMA) first classified the system. (Note: The Japan Meteorological Agency is the official Regional Specialized Meteorological Center for the western Pacific Ocean.) Based on data from Hurricane Hunters, a Tropical Cyclone Formation Alert was issued by the Joint Typhoon Warning Center (JTWC) at 1800 UTC on August 15. Situated south of a subtropical ridge, the cyclone was located within a favorable environment for further development. Early on August 16, the JMA upgraded the system into a tropical storm. (Note: Wind estimates from the JMA and most other basins throughout the world are sustained over 10 minutes, while estimates from the United States-based Joint Typhoon Warning Center are sustained over 1 minute. 10 minute winds are about 1.14 times the amount of 1 minute winds.) Following an increase in organization, the JTWC upgraded the system into Tropical Depression 15 that day.

Initially, the depression was expected by the JTWC to move north before accelerating towards the northwest. On August 17, the JTWC upgraded the depression into a tropical storm. At this time, the agency anticipated Thad to re-curve well east of Japan. By 0000 UTC on August 18, the JTWC upgraded Thad to typhoon status as the cyclone developed a ragged eye. Six hours later, the JMA followed suit. During the evening of August 18, the agency estimated that Thad reached its peak intensity of 80 mph (130 km/h) and a minimum barometric pressure of 955 mbar (28.2 inHg). Early the next day, the JTWC estimated peak winds of 100 mph (160 km/h). According to the JMA, Thad would maintain its peak wind speed until August 21, when the storm weakened slightly. However, the JTWC suggested that Thad began to deteriorate on August 20. The next day, forecasts from the JTWC indicated that the typhoon was expected to re-curve and accelerate due to a trough located south of Japan. However, since the trough moved into the Sea of Japan instead, a subtropical ridge developed east of Typhoon Thad. On August 22, however, Thad accelerated northward in the general direction of Japan. At 0000 UTC on August 23, the JTWC downgraded Thad into a tropical storm while moving onshore in central Japan. Several hours later, the JMA followed suit, even though Thad had moved well inland by that time. By this time, cooler air had taken toll on the storm, and that afternoon, data from both agencies indicated that Thad finished its transition into an extratropical cyclone. By that time, Thad merged with a trough over the Tatar Strait. However, the JMA continued monitoring the system until the morning of August 25.

== Preparations and impact ==
While moving across northern Japan, Thad affected 21 of Japan's 47 provinces while becoming the first storm to directly strike Kanto in 16 years. A peak rainfall total of 590 mm (23 in) was recorded in Oku-Nikko in Tochigi, including 571 mm (22.5 in) in a day. A peak hourly storm total of 571 mm (22.5 in) was measured at Kamisatomi in Gunma. Thad was responsible for strong winds, including a 76 km/h (47 mph) wind speed at Hidakamombetsu on Hokkaido.

In all, 43 people perished and 173 were injured. Damage totalled JP¥227.2 billion (US$1.03 billion). (Note: All currencies are converted from Japanese yen to United States Dollars using this with an exchange rate of the year 1981.) Overall, the typhoon flooded 31,082 houses and demolished 4,401 dwellings. Furthermore, the storm also blocked roads in 850 spots, destroyed 449 others, collapsed 80 bridges, broke dikes at 173 places, and generated 499 landslides. Approximately 27,000 people were left homeless because of Thad. About 115,000 households were left without electricity. Furthermore, Thad inundated 417,400 acres (168,915 ha) of farm land. Train service was interrupted in 22 lines, including 18 "bullet" trains. Four flights were also cancelled; however, by August 24, air traffic had returned to normal.

Along the Kanto Plain near Tokyo, Thad wrecked 22 houses, damaged 31 bridges, damaged roads in 145 places, and flooded 27 rivers. According to police reports, five individuals drowned and six others were initially reported missing in Suzaka, because of flooding from the nearby Ayu River that crushed houses along the bank. In Akita, a fishing boat with nine people aboard was capsized by strong winds; all nine were rendered as missing by police. Elsewhere, one person was killed by a falling tree and a fisherman drowned when his boat overturned. In the Ibaraki Province, just north of Tokyo, officials ordered the evacuation of 5,000 dwellings in the city of Ryugasaki, 2,500 of which were flooded. After the nearby Kogai River threatened to overflow their banks, over 1,000 families were evacuated. Another 4,000 families were evacuated in Fujishiro, though by August 25, the majority of the evacuated had returned to their homes. In the island of Hokkaido, air service was suspended; damage was severe in the area. However, the capital city of Tokyo avoided the worst of the storm. In all, Thad was considered the worst storm to strike the nation in two years.

== See also ==
- Other storms with the same name
- Typhoon Halong (2014)
