= List of storms named Tering =

The name Tering has been used to name six tropical cyclones in the Philippine Area of Responsibility by the PAGASA. It replaced the name Titang, which was retired in 1970.

- Typhoon Carmen (1974) (T7424, 28W, Tering) – a Category 1 typhoon that hit the Philippines and Hong Kong.
- Tropical Depression Tering (1978) – a tropical depression that affected the Philippines.
- Typhoon Ken (1982) (T8219, 20W, Tering) – a Category 3 typhoon that struck Japan, causing 5 fatalities.
- Tropical Storm Herbert (1986) (T8623, 20W, Tering) – made landfall in Vietnam as a tropical storm; struck the Philippines as a tropical depression.
- Typhoon Page (1990) (T9024, 26W, Tering) – a Category 5 typhoon that affected Japan and the Philippines.
- Tropical Depression Tering (1994) – a tropical depression only recognized by the PAGASA.

After the 2000 Pacific typhoon season, the PAGASA revised their naming lists and the name Tering was excluded.
