= List of storms named Tip =

The name Tip has been used for four tropical cyclones in the northwest Pacific Ocean.

- Typhoon Tip (1979) (T7921, 23W, Warling) – the most intense and tropical cyclone ever recorded, with a minimum pressure of 870 mb. Tip also remains the largest tropical cyclone worldwide, with a wind diameter up to 1,380 miles (2,220 km) across. Tip weakened to a Category 1 typhoon before making landfall in Japan, killing nearly 100 people.
- Typhoon Tip (1983) (T8302, 02W, Auring) – Formed near the Philippines and hit China as a tropical storm, causing minor damage.
- Typhoon Tip (1986) (T8612, 10W) – A Category 1 typhoon that remained well at sea.
- Severe Tropical Storm Tip (1989) (T8920, 23W) – A minimal tropical storm that remained well out at sea in September 1989.
