= List of storms named Teresa =

The name Teresa has been used for one tropical cyclone and one subtropical cyclone worldwide.

In the Atlantic Ocean:

- Subtropical Storm Teresa (2021) – a weak and disorganized storm that stayed at sea.

In the West Pacific Ocean:

- Typhoon Teresa (1994; T9430, 33W, Katring) – caused significant damage in the Philippines.
