= List of storms named Tisoy =

The name Tisoy has been used for two tropical cyclones in the Philippine Area of Responsibility by PAGASA in the Western Pacific Ocean. The name is a Tagalog nickname for Filipino Mestizos.

- Typhoon Ketsana (2003) (T0317, 20W, Tisoy) – Category 4 storm that never affected land.
- Typhoon Kammuri (2019) (T1928, 29W, Tisoy) – made landfall in the Bicol Region of the Philippines at peak intensity as a category 4-equivalent typhoon.

The name Tisoy was retired following the 2019 Pacific typhoon season and was replaced with Tamaraw, which refers to the tamaraw (Bubalus mindorensis) in Tagalog.
