= List of storms named Terry =

The name Terry or Terri has been used for four tropical cyclones worldwide, two in the Eastern Pacific Ocean, one in the South-West Indian Ocean, and one in the Australian region of the Indian Ocean.

In the Eastern Pacific:

- Hurricane Terry (1985), a moderate Category 3 hurricane that churned in the open ocean.
- Tropical Storm Terry (2021), formed at an unusually low latitude while staying at sea.

In the South-West Indian Ocean:

- Cyclone Terry–Danae (1976), struck Madagascar and then hit the east coast of Mozambique and South Africa.

In the Australian region:

- Cyclone Terri (2001), made landfall in the Pilbara region of Western Australia.
