= List of storms named Tara =

The name Tara has been used for four tropical cyclones in the East Pacific Ocean:

- Hurricane Tara (1961) – a catastrophic Category 1 hurricane.
- Tropical Storm Tara (1968) – never threatened land.
- Tropical Storm Tara (1982) – never threatened land.
- Tropical Storm Tara (2018) – brushed southwestern Mexico.

== See also ==
- Cyclone Oratia (2000) – a European windstorm known as Cyclone Tora in Norway.
