= List of storms named Tom =

The name Tom has been used for two tropical cyclones worldwide.

In the West Pacific:

- Typhoon Tom (1996) (T9620, 26W) – a Category 1 typhoon that churned in the open ocean

In the Australian region:

- Cyclone Tom (1977) – a Category 2 tropical cyclone that stayed at sea
