= Typhoon Trix =

Pacific typhoon in 1952

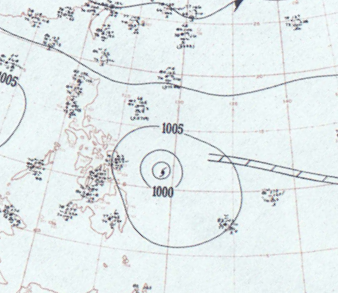
- Surface analysis of Typhoon Trix on October 20

Meteorological history
- Formed: October 15, 1952
- Dissipated: October 26, 1952

Typhoon
- 10-minute sustained (JMA)
- Lowest pressure: 965 hPa (mbar); 28.50 inHg

Category 4-equivalent typhoon
- 1-minute sustained (SSHWS/JTWC)
- Highest winds: 220 km/h (140 mph)

Overall effects
- Fatalities: >1,400
- Damage: >$60 million (1952 USD)
- Areas affected: Palau, Philippines, Vietnam
- IBTrACS
- Part of the 1952 Pacific typhoon season

Typhoon Trix was a devastating and deadly tropical cyclone of the 1952 Pacific typhoon season that severely impacted the Philippines and also affected the coast of Indochina, particularly Vietnam. As the eighteenth storm and twelfth typhoon of the season, Trix formed on October 15 as a tropical depression over Micronesia, being first tracked by the Joint Typhoon Warning Center (JTWC). Trix slowly strengthened as it moved westwards, before it rapidly intensified as it neared the Philippines. Slight weakening took place before the system passed over the country before restrengthening in the South China Sea. There, Trix degraded again for the second time and moved over Vietnam as a tropical storm before dissipating over Thailand.

The severe effects of Trix were on Visayas and southern Luzon, where croplands, houses and communication and transportation services were disrupted and destroyed as a result. The Philippine Weather Bureau warned people about rain-induced landslides, gusty winds and seas from the storm. UPI and AP called the system the worst in years due to its catastrophic aftermath. Many bodies were recovered and death toll were continuously increasing as several areas were slowly recovering from the disaster. The total casualty figure from the storm were at 995 while damages stood at $60 million, in which the majority are from Bicol region. In Indochina, over 405 were killed by the storm in various areas and damages were unknown. A French Air Force aircraft crashed in a mountain on October 29, killing 10 people and injuring one.

== Meteorological history ==
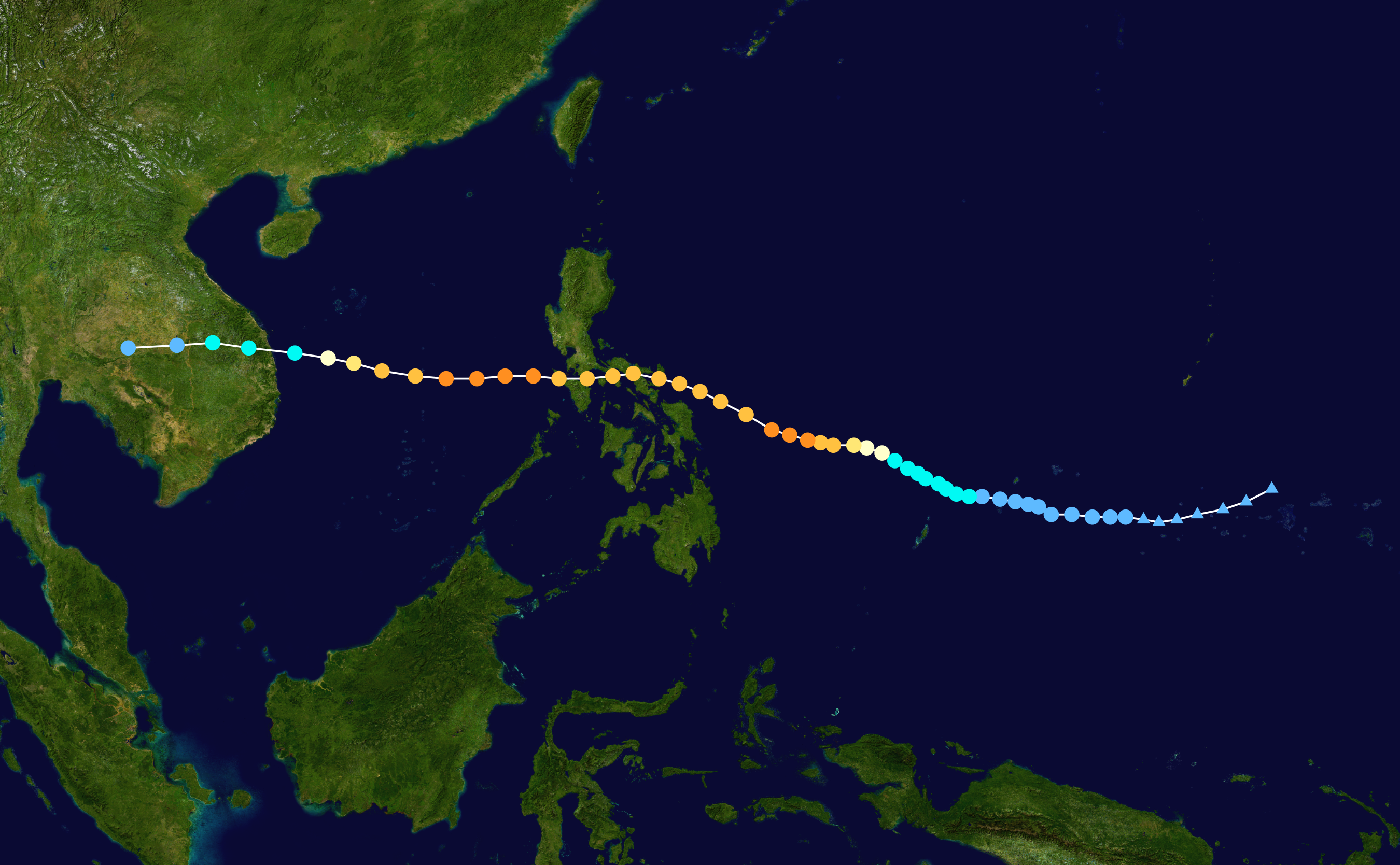
Map plotting the storm's track and intensity, according to the Saffir–Simpson scale Map key Saffir–Simpson scale Tropical depression (≤38 mph, ≤62 km/h) Tropical storm (39–73 mph, 63–118 km/h) Category 1 (74–95 mph, 119–153 km/h) Category 2 (96–110 mph, 154–177 km/h) Category 3 (111–129 mph, 178–208 km/h) Category 4 (130–156 mph, 209–251 km/h) Category 5 (≥157 mph, ≥252 km/h) Unknown Storm type Tropical cyclone Subtropical cyclone Extratropical cyclone, remnant low, tropical disturbance, or monsoon depression

Trix was first noted by the JTWC at 1200 UTC of October 15 over the Micronesian Islands with maximum sustained winds of 45 km/h (30 mph) while the Japan Meteorological Agency tracked the system as a tropical depression on 0000 UTC of the next day, with a barometric pressure of 1,004 hectopascals (29.6 inHg) near Ngulu Atoll. Moving southwestwards, the predecessor to the system was slow to organize until it reached the Philippine Sea east of Mindanao when Trix was upgraded to a tropical storm on October 16 at 1800 UTC with winds of 65 km/h (40 mph). By the next day, it passed to the north of Palau before it attained typhoon intensity, two days later as it progressed westwards. Intensification of Trix continued as it slowly approached the Philippines, strengthening to winds of 185 km/h (115 mph) on October 19. The storm then reached its lowest pressure according to JMA, with 965 hectopascals (28.5 inHg) on October 19 at 0600 UTC. It remained in this intensity as it reached its peak winds as a Category 4 typhoon on the Saffir–Simpson hurricane wind scale, with winds of 220 km/h (135 mph) on the next day.

After peaking, Trix began a weakening process at 1800 UTC the next day, with its winds down to 210 km/h (130 mph), equivalent to a high-end Category 3 typhoon. The system subsequently inclined northwestward and degraded further until it made landfall over the Bicol Region before it traversed the central parts of the Philippines on October 21 and 22. Upon the system clearing the country and emerging into the South China Sea that day, Trix reintensified to a Category 4 storm, achieving the same peak winds before it weakened progressively for the final time as it slowly approached Vietnam. The system was down to a tropical storm as it made its final landfall over the present-day Quảng Ngãi Province, Vietnam before the JMA ceased advisories on Trix inland at 1200 UTC of October 25; the JTWC continued to track the system until they stopped tracking the cyclone while over Surin Province, Thailand.

== Effects ==
The provinces of Samar, Leyte and Cebu in the Philippines were expected to be hit hard by Trix. 108-mile winds were also forecasted to impact the country. The tropical cyclone caused havoc along the Philippines and Indochina, killing over 1,400 individuals in its path. 995 of them are from the former and the remaining are presumed from the latter. A wind speed of 215 km/h (135 mph) were recorded along with the system.

On October 22, reports from the country indicated that 49 were killed by the storm and damages was estimated at $2.5 million. These deaths were first reported in Sorsogon, Albay, Camarines Norte and Camarines Sur. Thousands of bamboo and wood houses and huts were also leveled by Trix; however, the capital Manila was spared from its full brunt as the system crossed the country. Damages to public and private establishments, fish corrals and several crops were reported to be "heavy" in Leyte, Samar and southeastern Luzon. At that time, transportation and communication activities were disrupted and local flights in the country were also canceled as a result; however it was expected to resume at that day. The country's Weather Bureau warned Filipinos in the path of the storm to continue to take action against floods, winds and rough seas in Mindoro, northwest Visayas and south Luzon.

On October 23, the Philippine Red Cross reported that the death toll from Trix further rose to 370 and the missing persons at 200. These casualty figures were released by the organization at 8:30 PM PHT (6:30 AM EST). The governor of Albay at that time, Manuel Calleja, informed the PRC via telegraph that over 118 residents of Tabaco City alone perished during the storm and they were subsequently buried in mass graves on October 23. The United Press International called Trix "the most violent storm to hit the Philippines in five years". They also estimated a casualty toll of 155 and damages of $2.5 million; however, according to them, it was "conservative". Broken communication lines disrupted the recovery process in the country and the transmission of information regarding the aftermath of the storm in various areas across Trix' path. Soggy airfields also hampered the delivery of relief goods and supplies to affected areas.

The president at that time, Elpidio Quirino ordered the country's health secretary Juan Salcedo to go to Bicol region to lead the relief efforts there. He also mobilized the nation's relief efforts in the severely hit areas for fast and speed recoveries. Legazpi reports indicated that thousands there were homeless, Naga City's private institutions and houses were damaged due to the storm, Leyte lost half of its rice crops, 80% of banana crops and 50% of fruit trees. Philippine Air Force planes brought medicine and food shipments for Legazpi; the PRC sent its people to other affected areas with clothing, medicine, tents, canned good and rice. However, these efforts were continued to be hampered by communication and transport difficulties. Damage estimates were said to be at "several million dollars". 30% of houses in its path were also damaged.

By October 24, 431 were reported to have been killed by Trix and the missing stood at 369. Damages were officially estimated at $60 million. Rodolfo Nazarena, a United Press staff correspondent flew to Legazpi to survey and see the damages there and reported that 90% of city were wrecked. Only three buildings survived in the area. The death toll slowly rose as communications slowly came back from some of the affected areas.

"The worst typhoon within living memory."

— Feliciano Cruz, a Philippine Red Cross official.

On October 25, the death toll further rose to 444 and the missing at 460. A Red Cross spokesperson from the country reported that death toll might rise higher to 600 as late reports continue to appear despite a new typhoon approaching from its east, Wilma. Meanwhile, the Associated Press called Trix the "worst tropical storm in 50 years" as it devastated a wide swath of southern Luzon especially Legazpi and Tabaco. Preliminary estimates by the governor of Albay were set at $40 million from school, building and crop damages. Over 500,000 persons were rendered homeless. Ramon Magsaysay, the defense secretary at that time, flew to the affected areas in the south to assess the damages, along with cases of canned goods and ricebags as the military's initial contribution to the victims of the disaster. Food, clothing and medical supplies were also transported aboard Philippine Navy ships for Albay, Sorsogon and Northern Samar, the areas reported without food or water as of that date. private groups and institutions in Manila began raising funds to help the individuals who suffered greatly during Trix.

On the next day, 444 individuals were reported dead from Trix and 469 were still missing, bringing up the death toll to 913. Unofficial reports also indicated that over 350 fishermen were lost from Bicol region due to the storm. In addition, the Natunawan Island, a barrier island near San Carlos, Negros Occidental submerged due to the cyclone. The official casualty record from the system were finalized at 995, with 509 dead and 486 missing.

In Indochina, reports there indicated that the storm killed at least 405 in the region. A tornado near present-day Ho Chi Minh City killed 10 people and injured one when a French Air Force aircraft crashed in a mountain near the area.

== See also ==
- 1952 Pacific typhoon season
