= List of storms named Tilda =

The name Tilda has been used to name four tropical cyclones in the West Pacific Ocean:

- Typhoon Tilda (1954) (T5422, 19W) – a Category 4-equivalent typhoon.
- Typhoon Tilda (1959) (T5903, 03W) – a Category 4-equivalent typhoon.
- Typhoon Tilda (1961) (T6123, 30W) – a Category 5-equivalent super typhoon that affected Japan and China, sinking the Lebanese merchant ship Sheik offshore Kitadaitōjima.
- Typhoon Tilda (1964) (T6419, 28W, Basiang) – a Category 3-equivalent typhoon that made landfall in Vietnam, causing some of the largest and longest floods in the Mekong River drainage basin.
