= 1993–94 Australian region cyclone season =

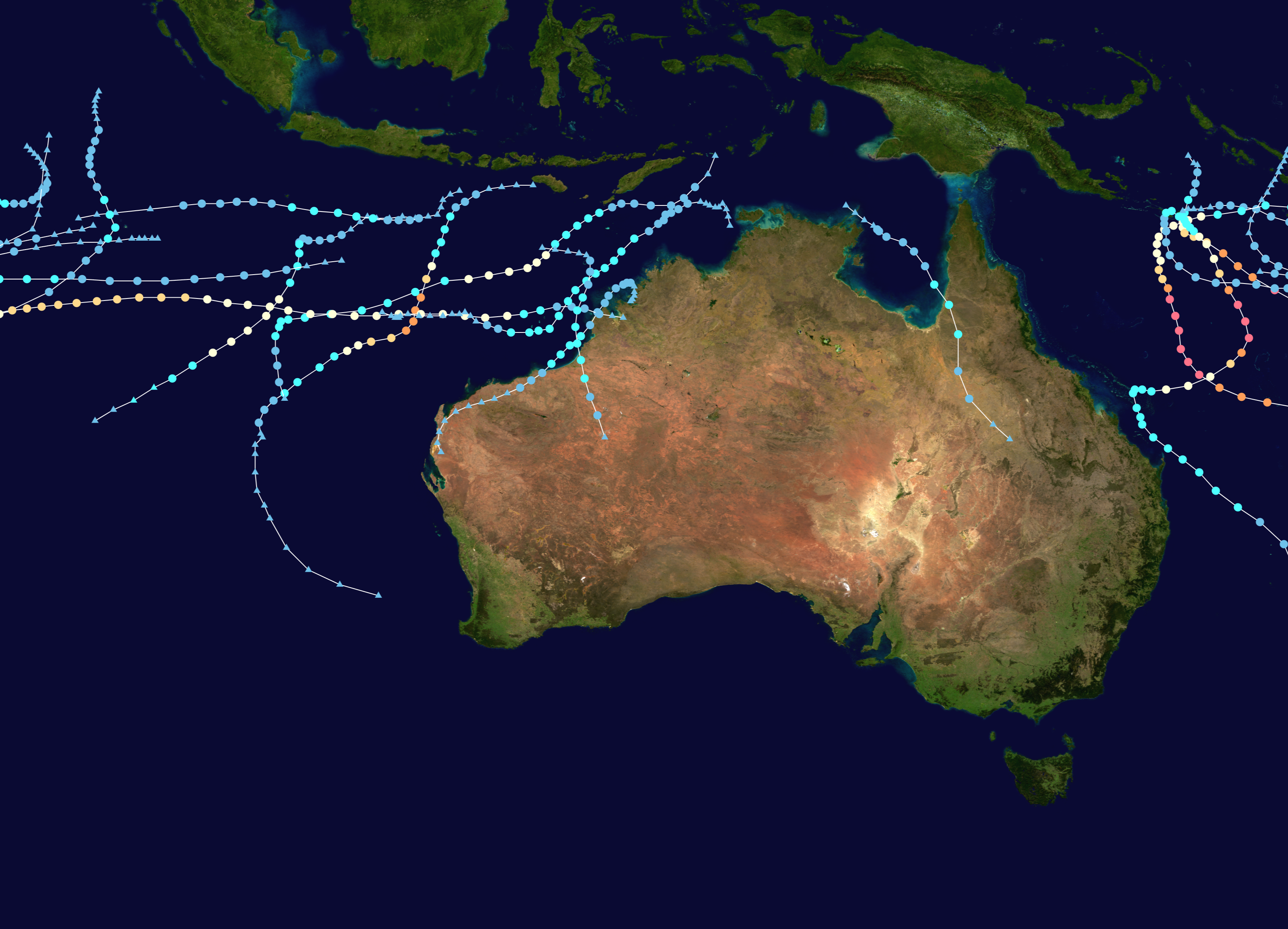
- Season summary map

Seasonal boundaries
- First system formed: 14 December 1993
- Last system dissipated: 1 May 1994

Strongest storm
- Name: Theodore
  - Maximum winds: 200 km/h (125 mph) (10-minute sustained)
  - Lowest pressure: 910 hPa (mbar)

Seasonal statistics
- Tropical lows: 14
- Tropical cyclones: 12
- Severe tropical cyclones: 7
- Total fatalities: 22
- Total damage: Unknown

Related articles
- 1993–94 South-West Indian Ocean cyclone season; 1993–94 South Pacific cyclone season

The 1993–94 Australian region cyclone season was a slightly above average Australian cyclone season. It was also an event in the ongoing cycle of tropical cyclone formation. It ran from 1 November 1993 to 30 April 1994. The regional tropical cyclone operational plan also defines a tropical cyclone year separately from a tropical cyclone season, and the "tropical cyclone year" ran from 1 July 1993 to 30 June 1994.

Tropical cyclones in this area were monitored by four Tropical Cyclone Warning Centres (TCWCs): the Australian Bureau of Meteorology in Perth, Darwin, and Brisbane; and TCWC Port Moresby in Papua New Guinea.

== Systems ==
=== Severe Tropical Cyclone Naomi ===
- Category 3 severe tropical cyclone (Australian scale)
- Tropical storm (SSHWS)
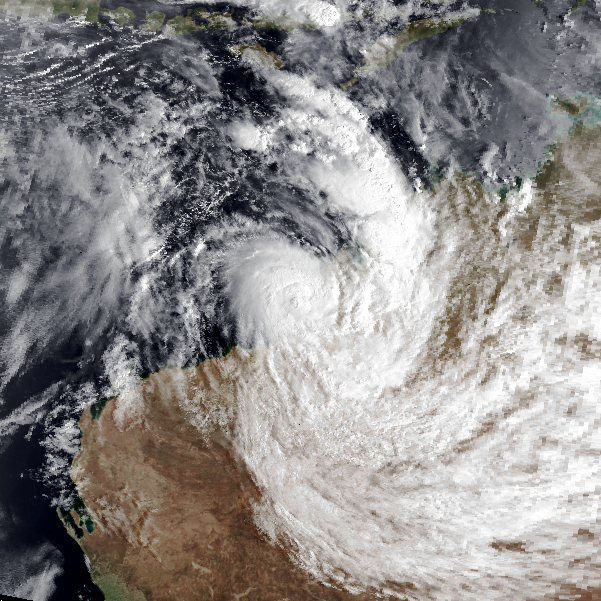
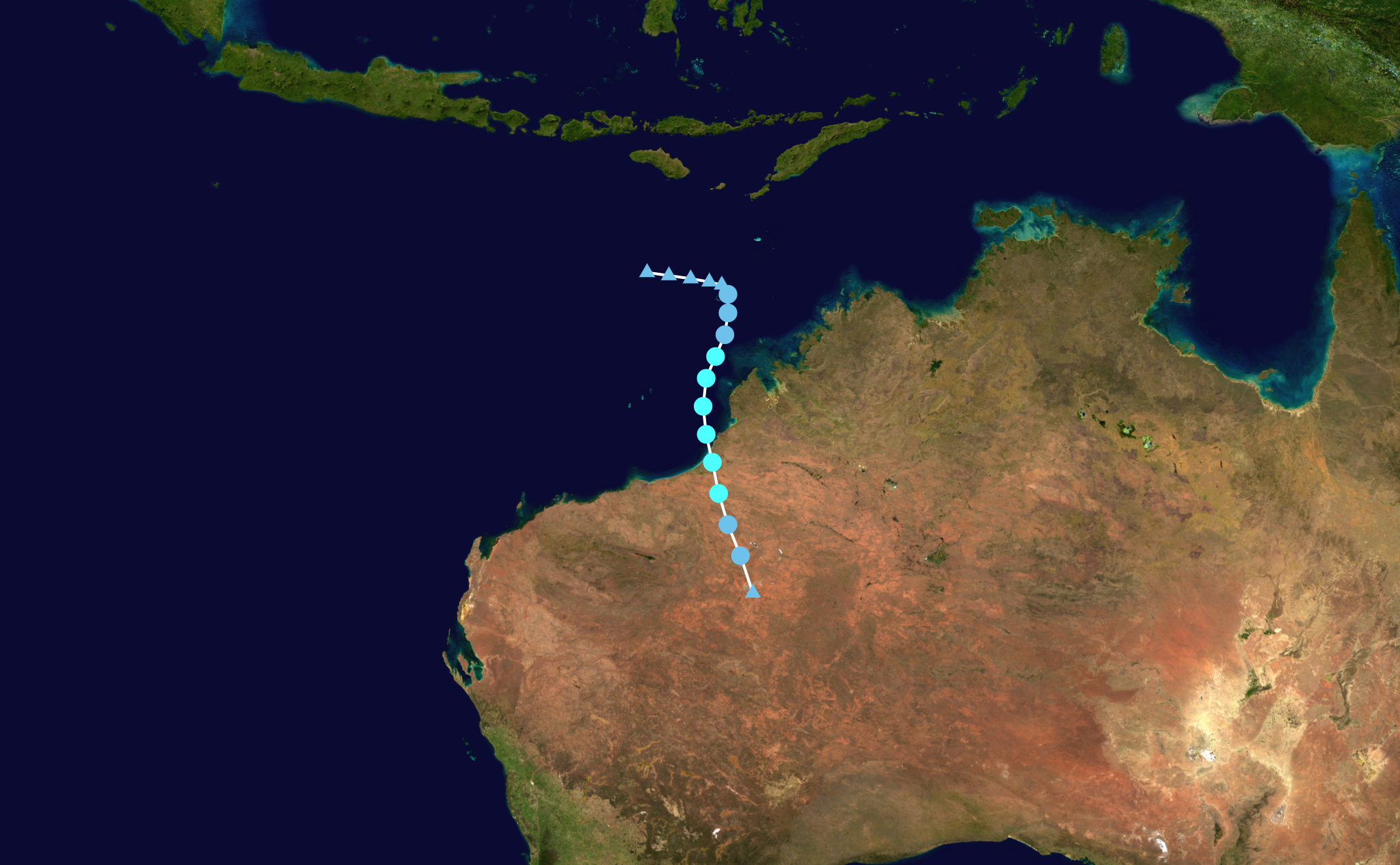
- Duration: 14 December – 18 December
- Peak intensity: 150 km/h (90 mph) (10-min); 960 hPa (mbar)

Naomi was the first cyclone of the 1993/94 season. Forming early on 15 December 1993, the storm moved south and strengthened into a Category 3 before making landfall. There was moderate damage and a fishing boat was disabled during the storm. There were no deaths.

=== Tropical Cyclone Oscar ===
- Category 1 tropical cyclone (Australian scale)
- Tropical storm (SSHWS)
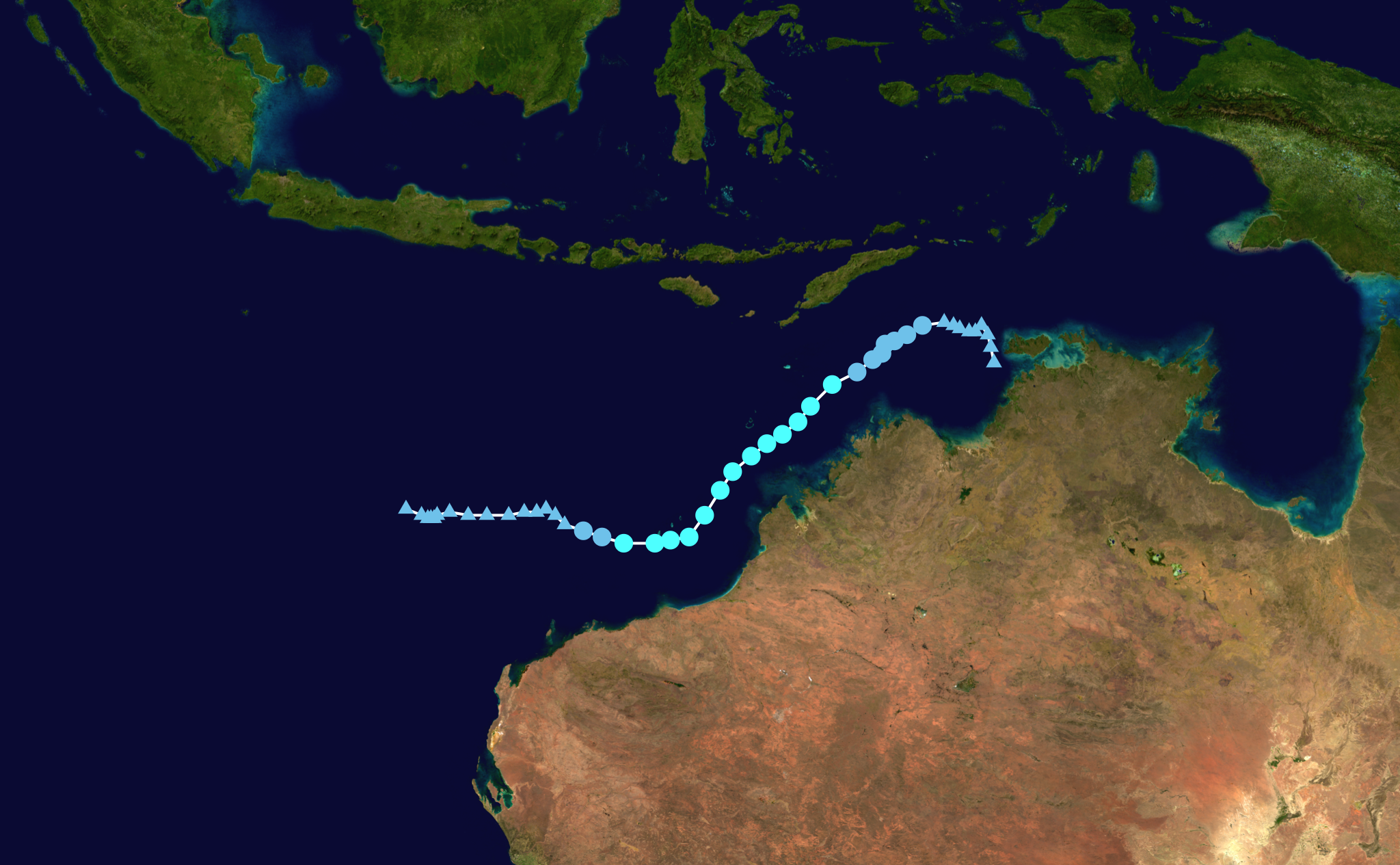
- Duration: 28 December – 9 January
- Peak intensity: 65 km/h (40 mph) (10-min); 995 hPa (mbar)

Cyclone Oscar was a weak system, and only barely reached cyclone strength on 3 January 1994 for about a 12-hour period. It moved on a generally west-southwest course parallel to the Kimberley and Pilbara coasts.

=== Severe Tropical Cyclone Rewa ===
- Category 5 severe tropical cyclone (Australian scale)
- Category 4 tropical cyclone (SSHWS)
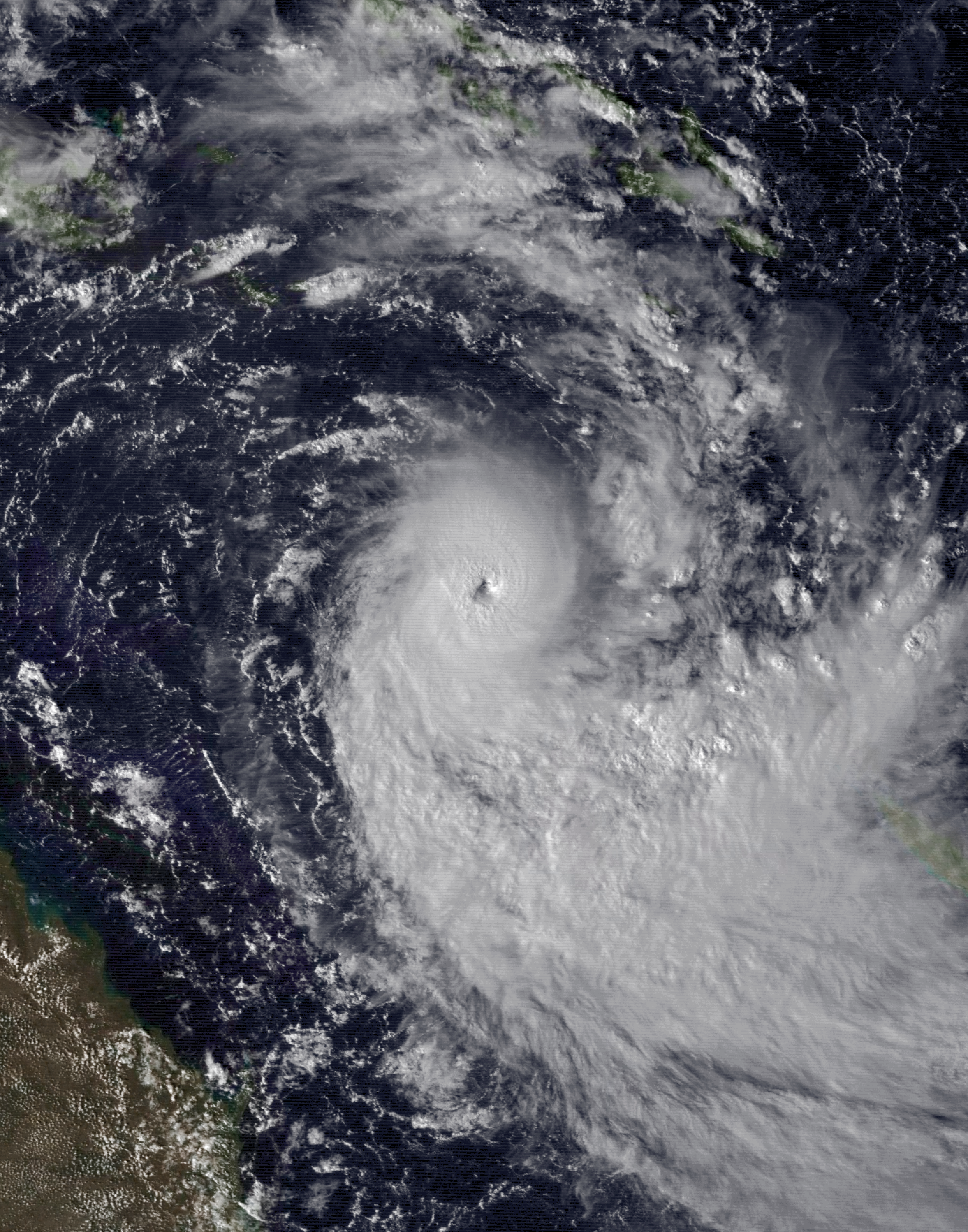
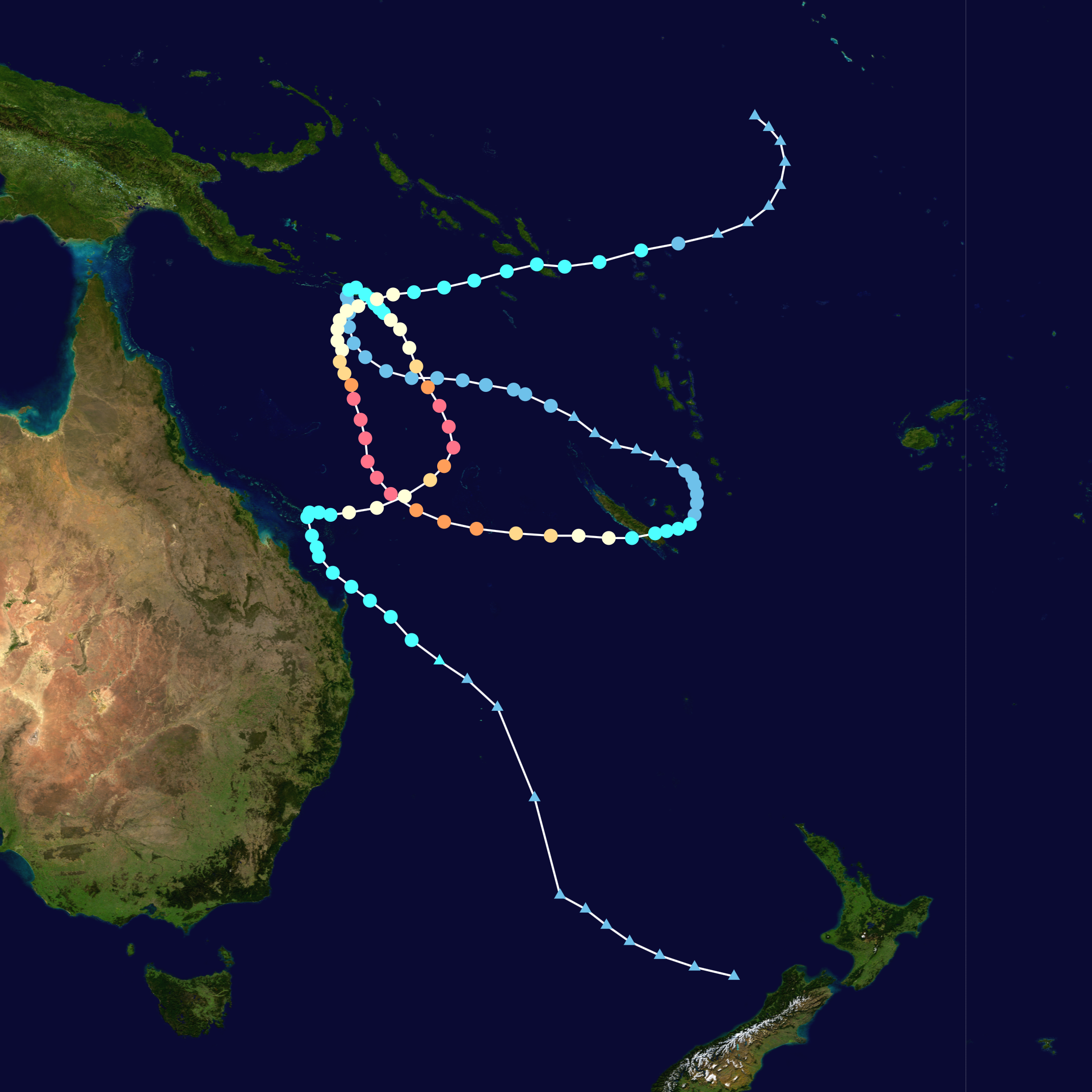
- Duration: 29 December (Entered basin) – 21 January (Out of basin from 4-10 January)
- Peak intensity: 205 km/h (125 mph) (10-min); 920 hPa (mbar)

Cyclone Rewa formed on 26 December 1993. It looped around the Coral Sea for almost a month, crossed New Caledonia and the Solomon Island, and dissipated on 21 January. Rewa was the longest-lived South Pacific tropical cyclone on record, lasting 25 days, from 26 December to 21 January.

=== Severe Tropical Cyclone Pearl-Farah ===
- Category 3 severe tropical cyclone (Australian scale)
- Category 2 tropical cyclone (SSHWS)
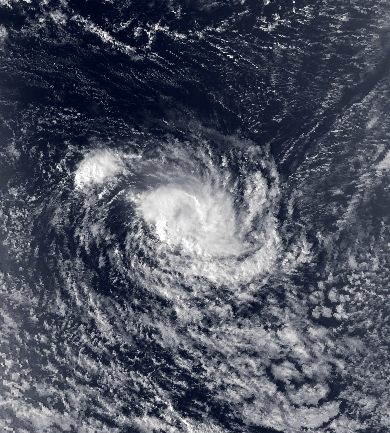
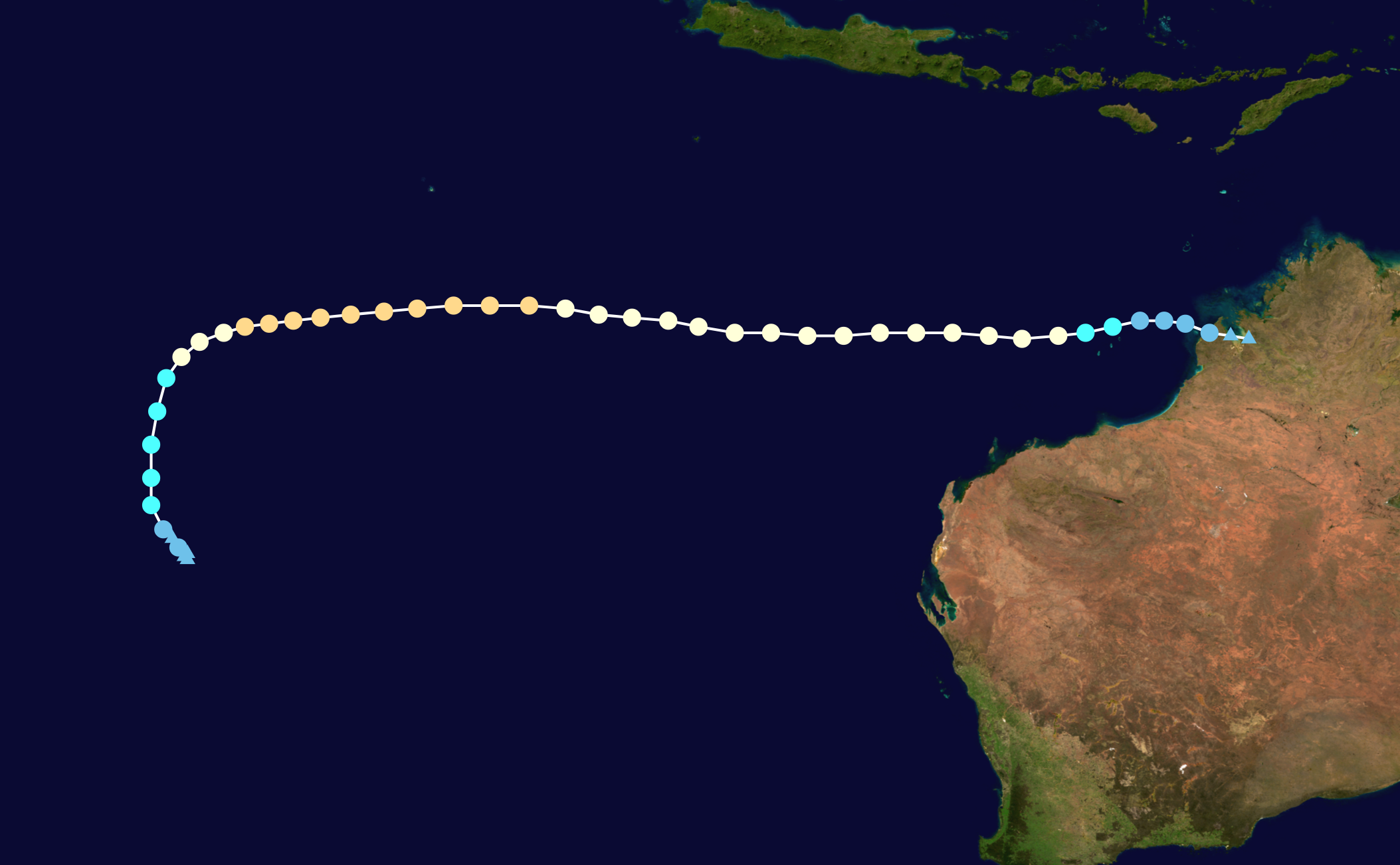
- Duration: 10 January – 21 January
- Peak intensity: 155 km/h (100 mph) (10-min); 950 hPa (mbar)

On 11 January, a tropical low formed northwest of Broome, Western Australia. It was named Pearl a few hours later by the Bureau of Meteorology. The cyclone continued westward and reached a peak intensity of 155 km/h (100 mph). As the system moved west of 90°E, MFR took over warning responsibility on 18 January and renamed the cyclone Farah. At that time, MFR estimated winds of about 120 km/h (75 mph). After having moved westward due to a ridge to the south, Farah turned to the south upon entering the basin due to an approaching trough, which previously absorbed Edmea. High wind shear caused rapid weakening, and by 19 January, there was little remaining convection. The next day, Farah weakened to tropical depression status and turned to the southeast. The ridge built behind the trough, causing the depression to stall and drift northward, and by 22 February, Farah dissipated.

=== Severe Tropical Cyclone Quenton ===
- Category 3 severe tropical cyclone (Australian scale)
- Category 1 tropical cyclone (SSHWS)
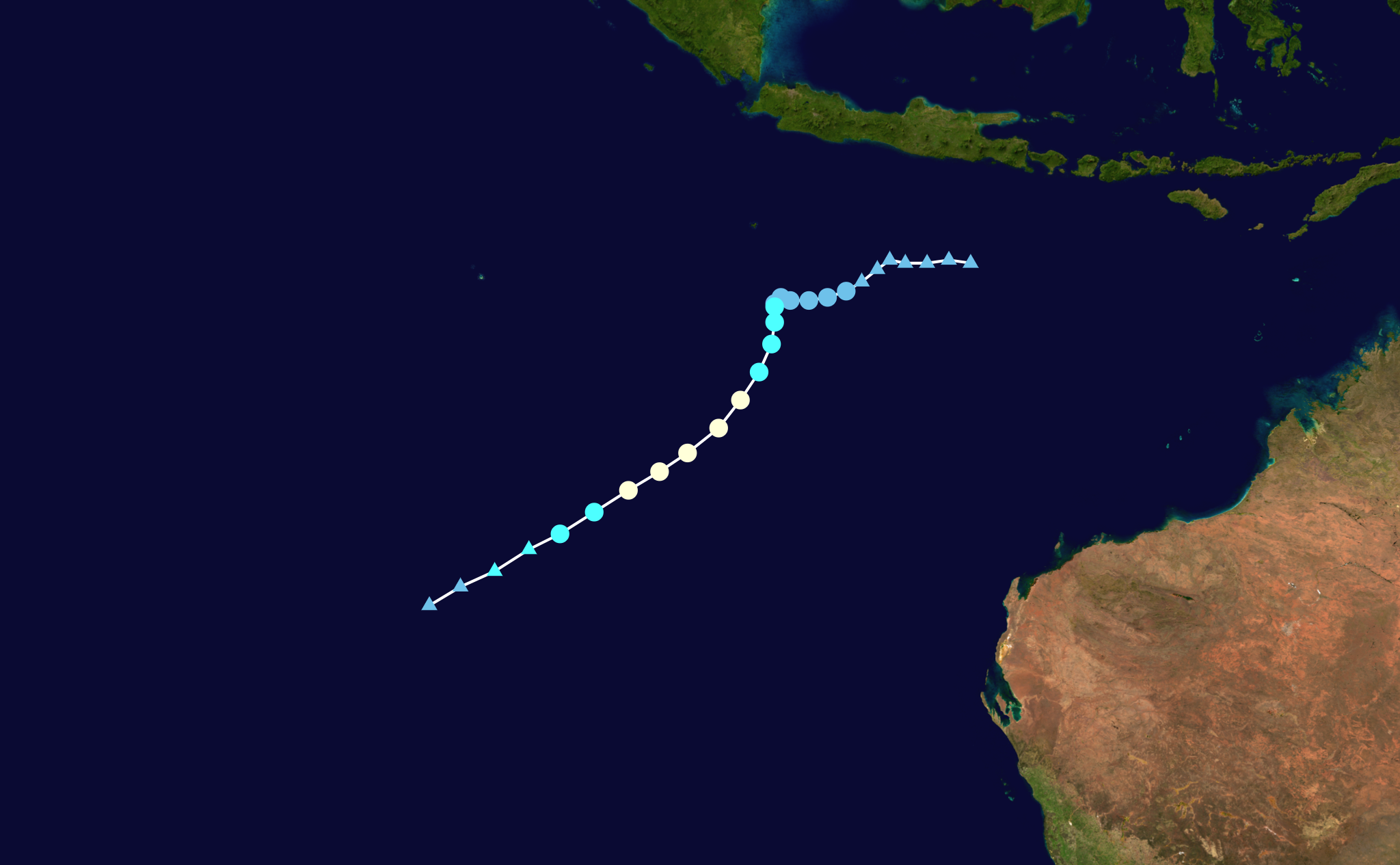
- Duration: 23 January – 29 January
- Peak intensity: 150 km/h (90 mph) (10-min); 955 hPa (mbar)

Tropical Cyclone Quenton began as a tropical low to the east of Christmas Island on 22 January 1994. The low moved slowly west, then on 25 January intensified to cyclone strength and moved southward across the Indian Ocean. By early on the 29th the cyclone had dissipated.

=== Tropical Cyclone Sadie ===
- Category 1 tropical cyclone (Australian scale)
- Tropical storm (SSHWS)
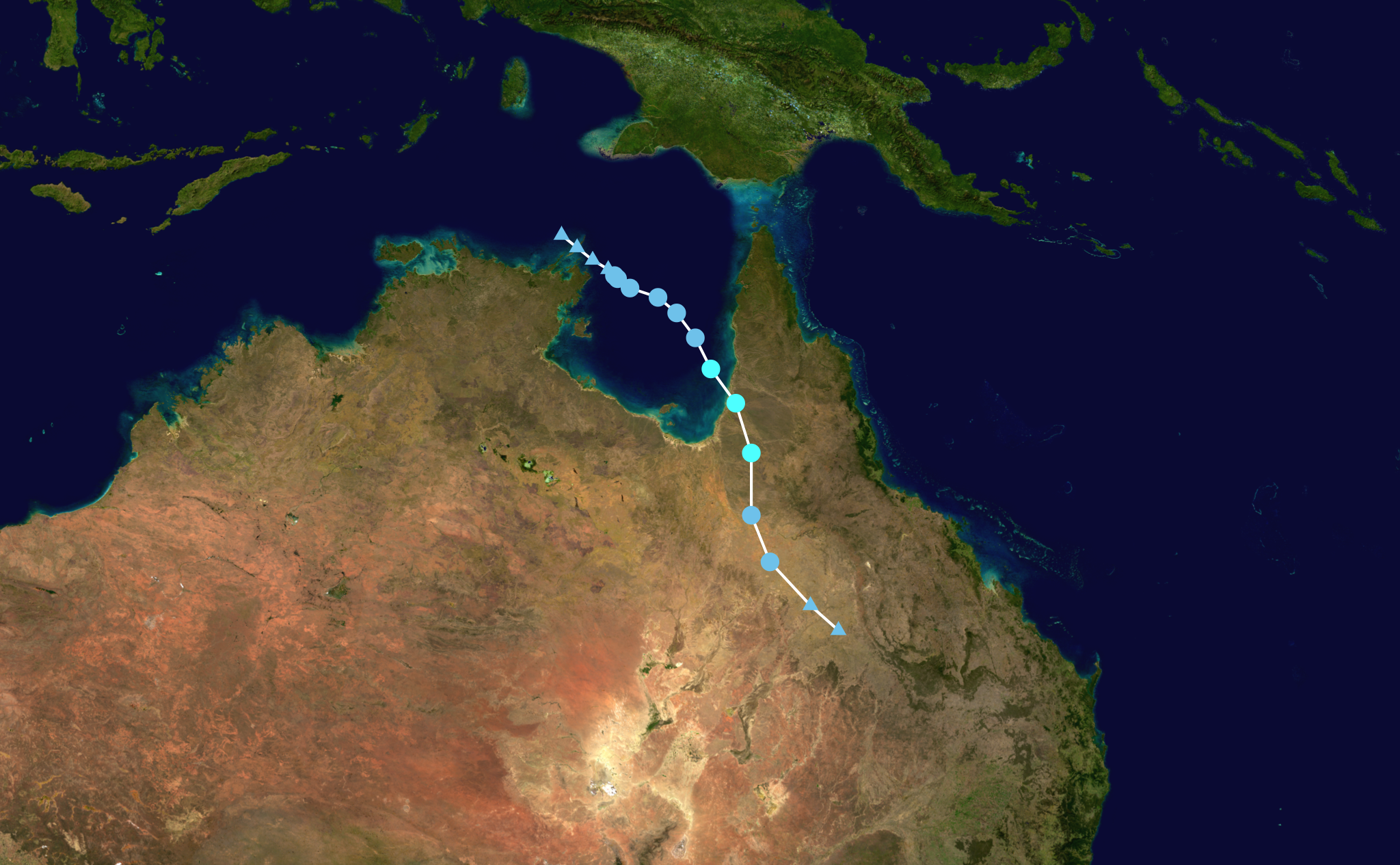
- Duration: 29 January – 31 January
- Peak intensity: 85 km/h (50 mph) (10-min); 990 hPa (mbar)

During 29 January, the BoM reported that a tropical low had developed within the monsoon trough, to the north of the Gove Peninsula in the Northern Territory. During that day the low rapidly developed further as it moved south-eastwards, before early on 29 January the BoM's TCWC Darwin reported that the low had developed into a category 1 tropical cyclone and named it Sadie as the system started to move southwards. Later that day the JTWC initiated advisories on Cyclone Sadie and designated it as Tropical Cyclone 14P, while the system started to move towards the east and was near its peak 1-minute maximum sustained windspeeds of 85 km/h (50 mph). Early the next day Cyclone Sadie made landfall to the north of near Normanton, after the BoM had reported that the system had peaked with 10-minute maximum sustained winds of 85 km/h (50 mph). After making landfall, the system moved towards the south-southeast before weakening and degenerating into a tropical low/rain depression later that day.

=== Severe Tropical Cyclone Theodore ===
- Category 5 severe tropical cyclone (Australian scale)
- Category 4 tropical cyclone (SSHWS)
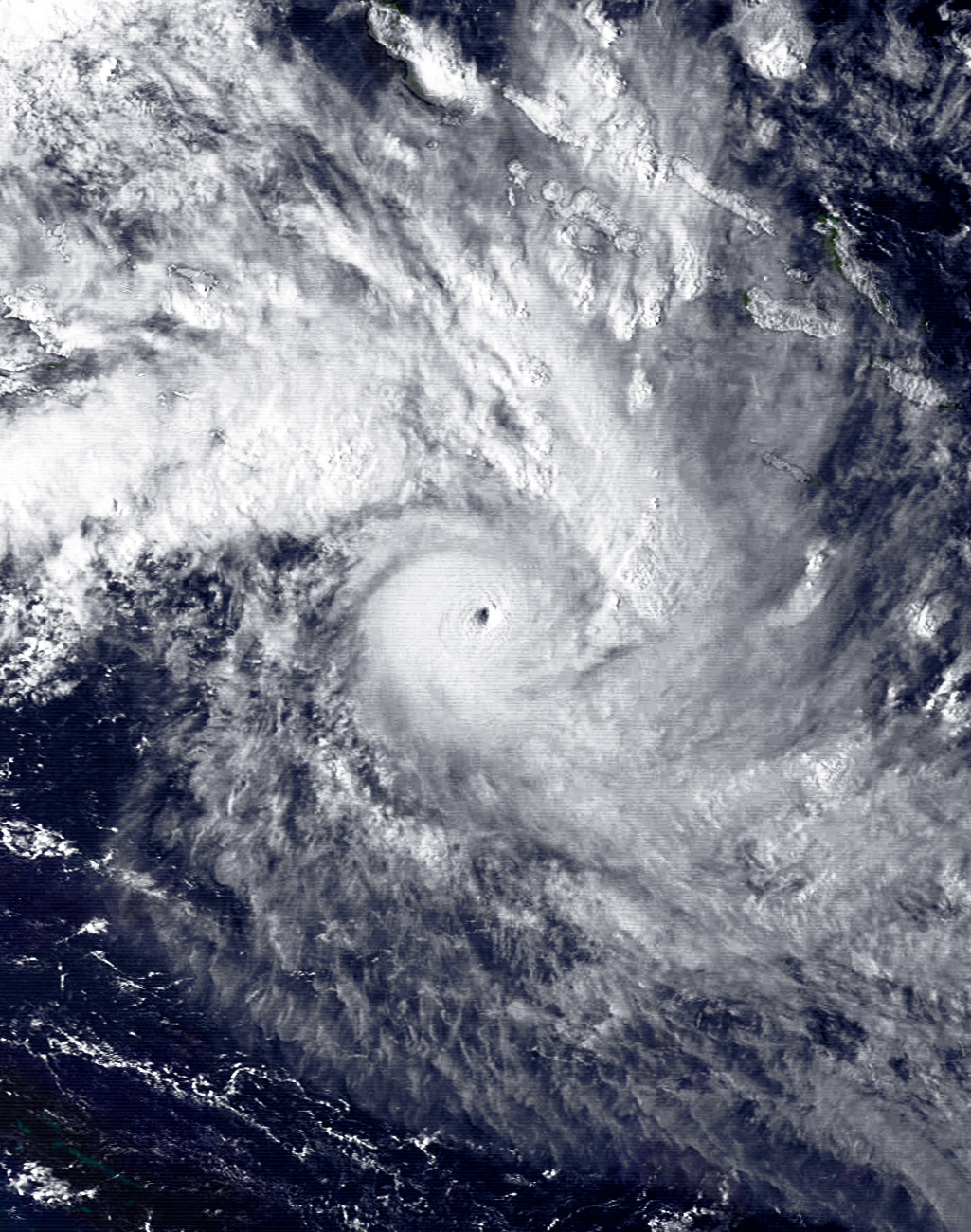
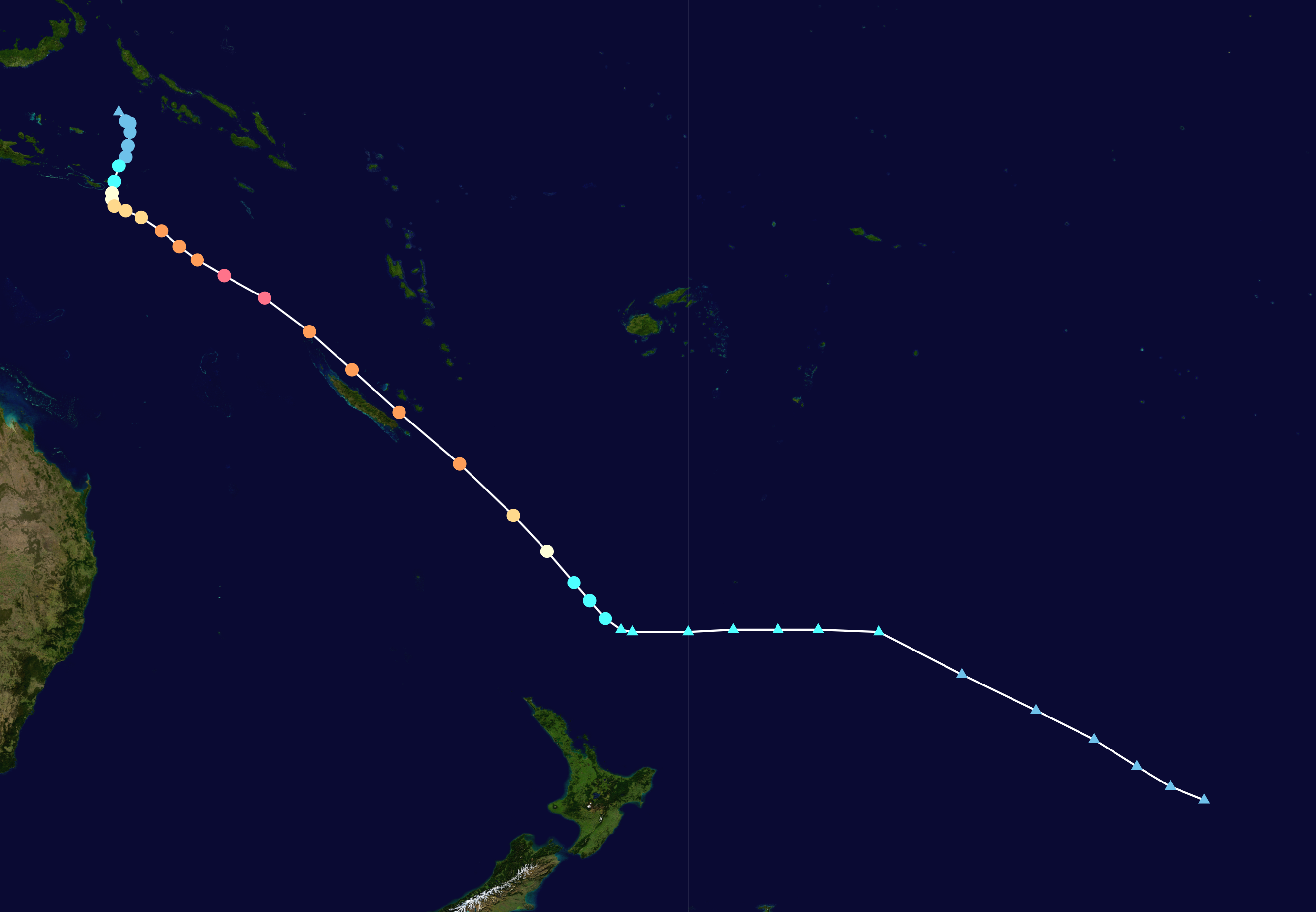
- Duration: 22 February – 26 February (Exited basin)
- Peak intensity: 215 km/h (130 mph) (10-min); 910 hPa (mbar)

Severe Tropical Cyclone Theodore formed from a tropical low located over the northern Solomon Islands on 22 February. The low began to intensify, reaching cyclone intensity at 1800 UTC on 23 February. Theodore continued to intensify rapidly while moving in a southerly direction. By 24 February, Theodore's central pressure was at 945 hPa (27.9 inHg), and recurved to the east-southeast. By 25 February, the storm reached its peak intensity, with a minimum atmospheric pressure of 910 hPa (27 inHg). Theodore's pressure increased to 935 hPa (27.6 inHg) while rapidly moving southeast on 26 February. The storm eventually passed between New Caledonia and the Loyalty group of islands. Eventually, the cyclone had lost its tropical characteristics, eventually dissipating over the open seas as it moved eastward on 2 March.

The Solomon Islands and Papua New Guinea experienced high rainfall and flooding in Theodore's early stages. Rossel and Sudest Islands in Papua New Guinea saw damage. Homes, schools, and crops were destroyed. New Caledonia experienced gale-force winds.

=== Severe Tropical Cyclone Sharon ===
- Category 4 severe tropical cyclone (Australian scale)
- Category 3 tropical cyclone (SSHWS)
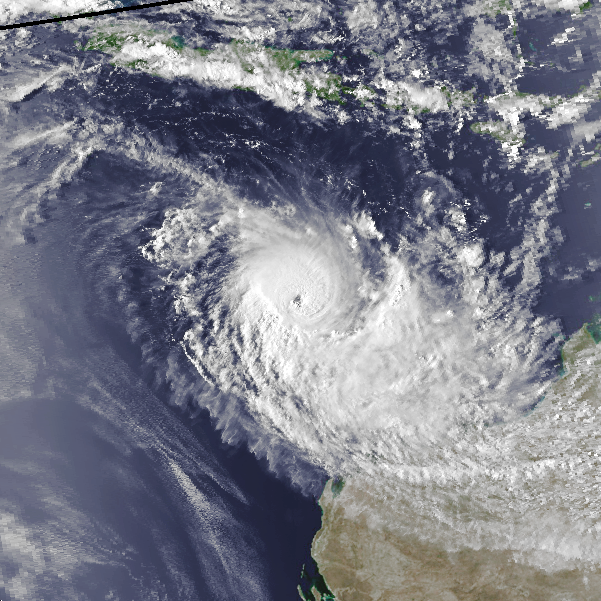
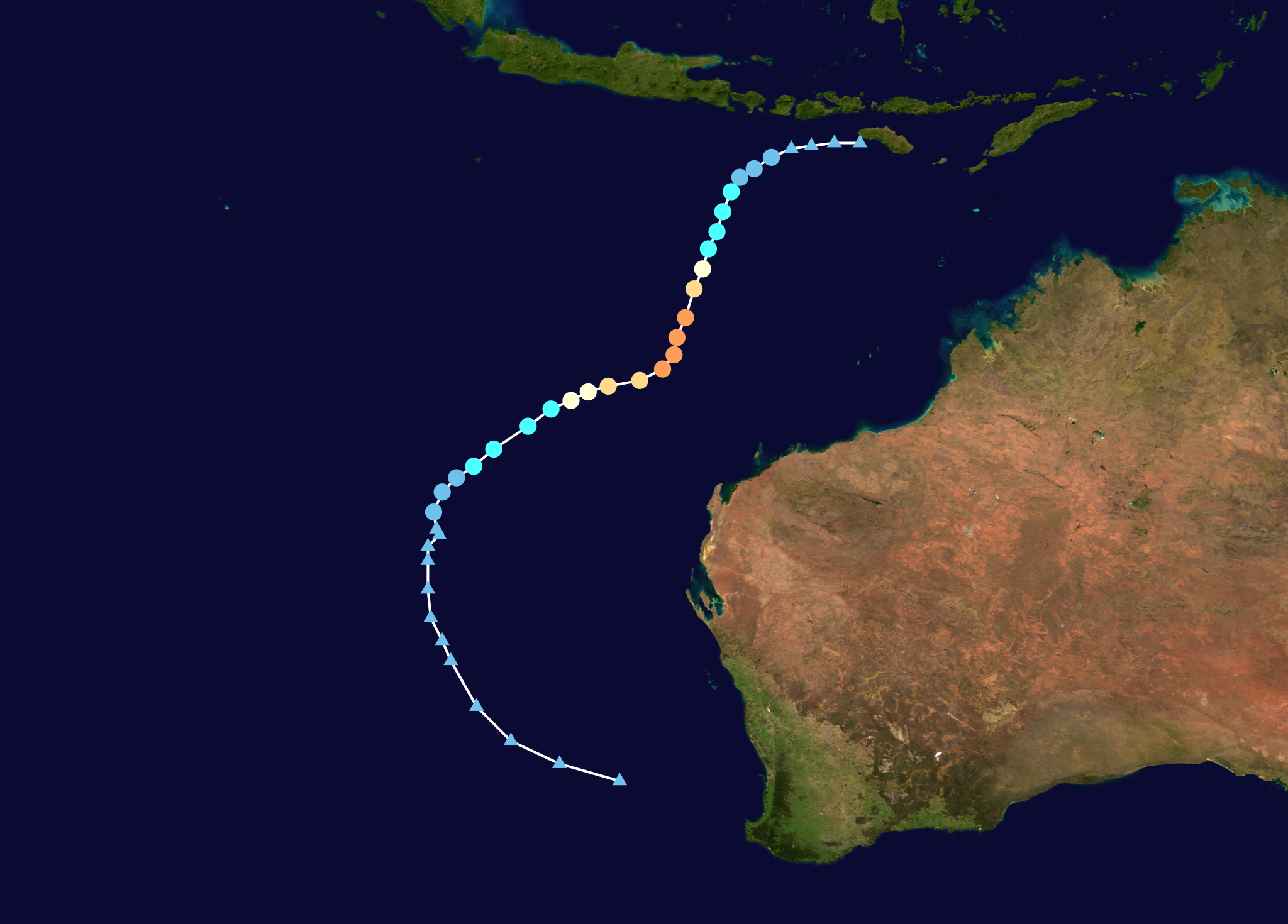
- Duration: 12 March – 22 March
- Peak intensity: 195 km/h (120 mph) (10-min); 930 hPa (mbar)

Tropical Cyclone Sharon was the most intense cyclone in the Western Australian region during the 1993/94 season. It formed about 1100 km north of Northwest Cape on 12 March 1994, then rapidly intensified during the 14th while moving on a south-southwest path towards the west Pilbara coast. During the 16th the cyclone rapidly weakened due to movement into a region of strong westerly wind shear. Cyclone warnings were issued for the west Pilbara and upper west coast on the 16th but were cancelled on the morning of the 17th Continued shearing and subsequent movement over cooler waters weakened the storm to below cyclone strength by the morning of the 18th.

=== Tropical Cyclone Tim ===
- Category 1 tropical cyclone (Australian scale)
- Tropical storm (SSHWS)
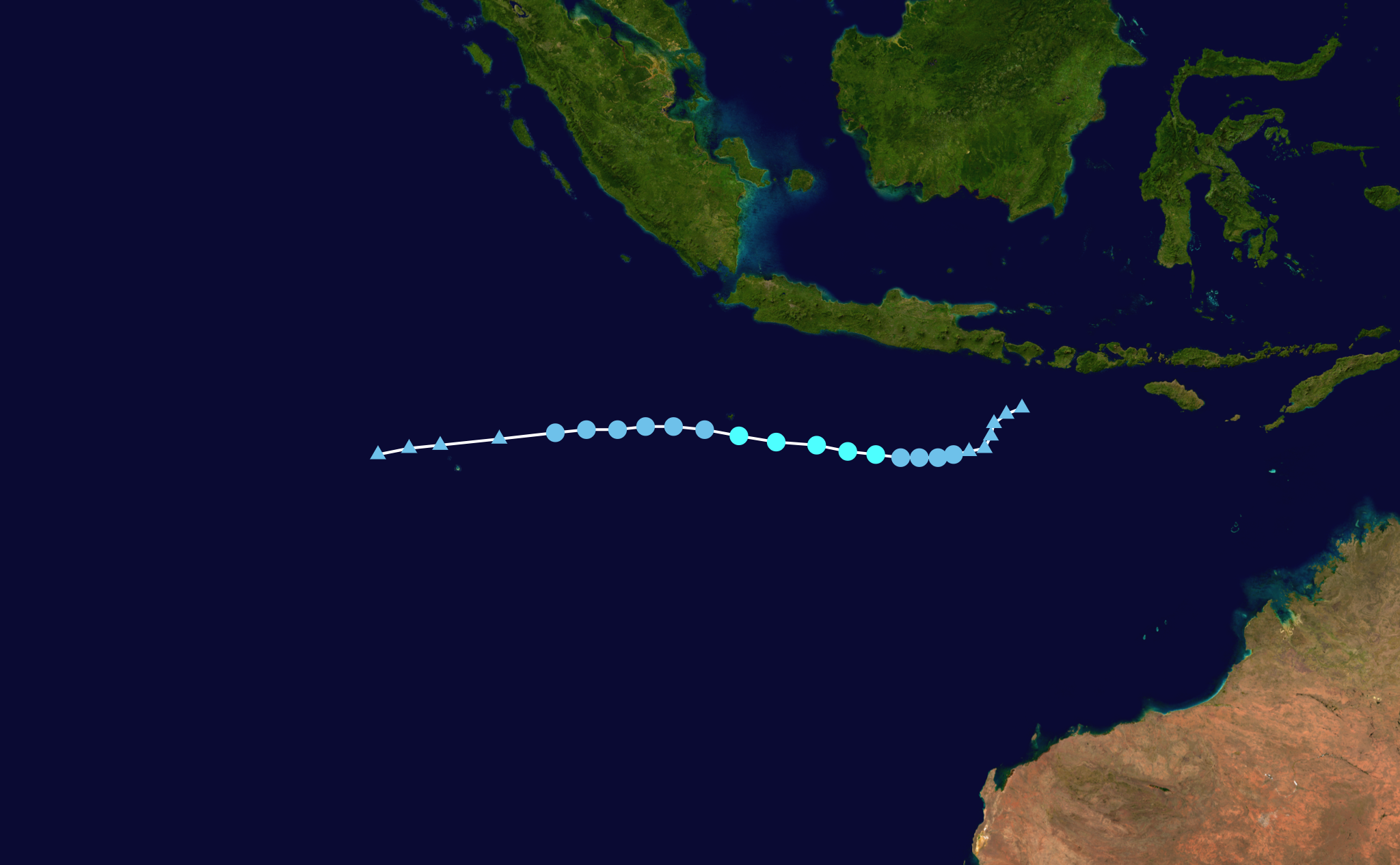
- Duration: 28 March – 3 April
- Peak intensity: 65 km/h (40 mph) (10-min); 995 hPa (mbar)

Tropical Cyclone Tim was a very small weak system that moved on a generally westward path from south of Sumatra to the Cocos Islands from 28 March to 3 April 1994. It passed about 100 km to the south of Christmas Island but its effects, other than a wind shift, were barely recognizable on the Island.

=== Severe Tropical Cyclone Vivienne ===
- Category 3 severe tropical cyclone (Australian scale)
- Category 1 tropical cyclone (SSHWS)
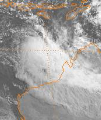
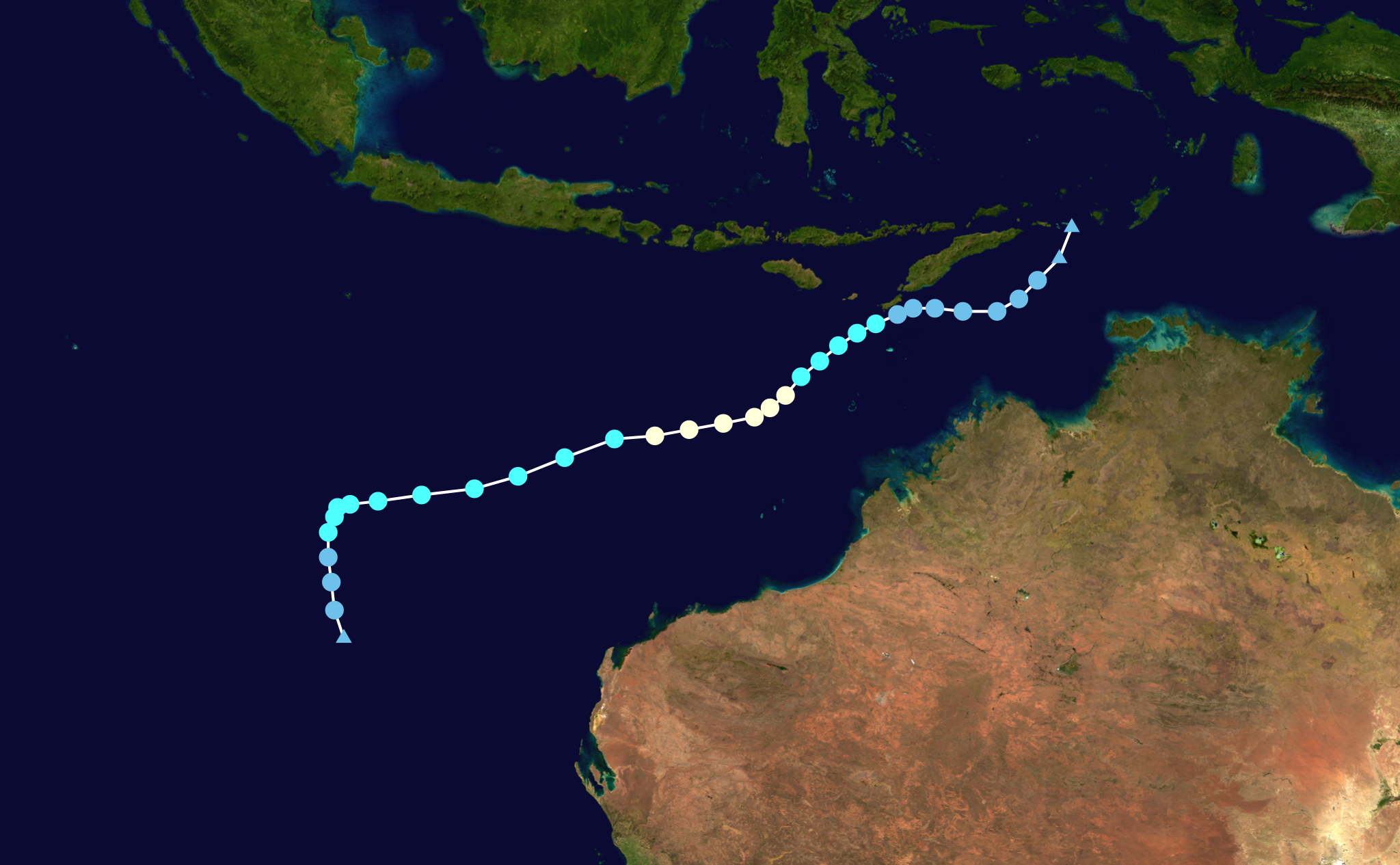
- Duration: 5 April – 13 April
- Peak intensity: 155 km/h (100 mph) (10-min); 955 hPa (mbar)

Tropical Cyclone Vivienne formed from a tropical low that had moved westward across the Timor Sea. It intensified rapidly during the afternoon and night of 5 April 1994, reaching maximum intensity on 8 April when it was located 550 km to the north-northwest of Broome. Its development from here on was hampered by vertical wind shear and Vivienne moved on a generally west-southwest path parallel to, but well offshore from, the Western Australian coastline. It dissipated on 13 April and no watches or warnings were issued.

=== Tropical Depression 29P ===
- Tropical depression (SSHWS)
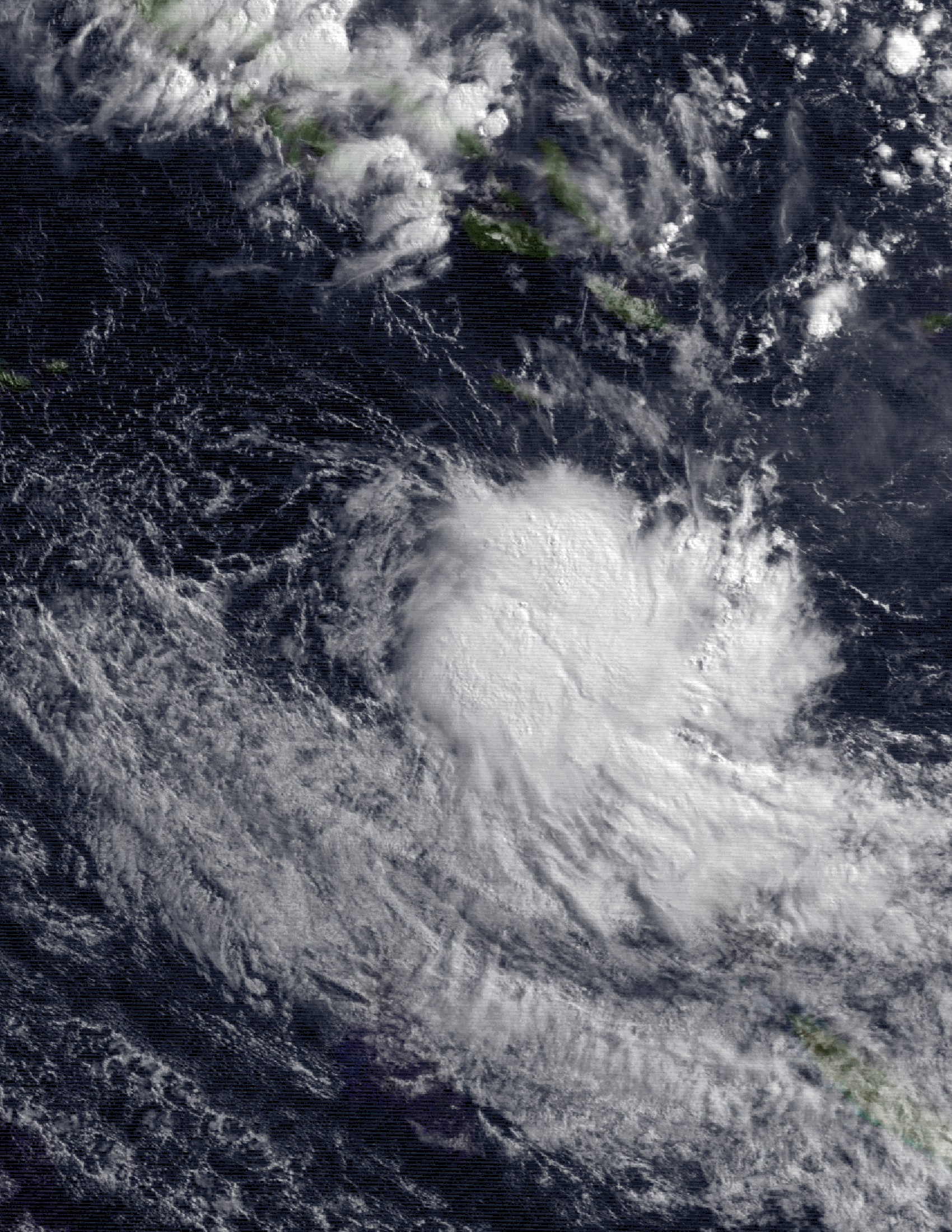
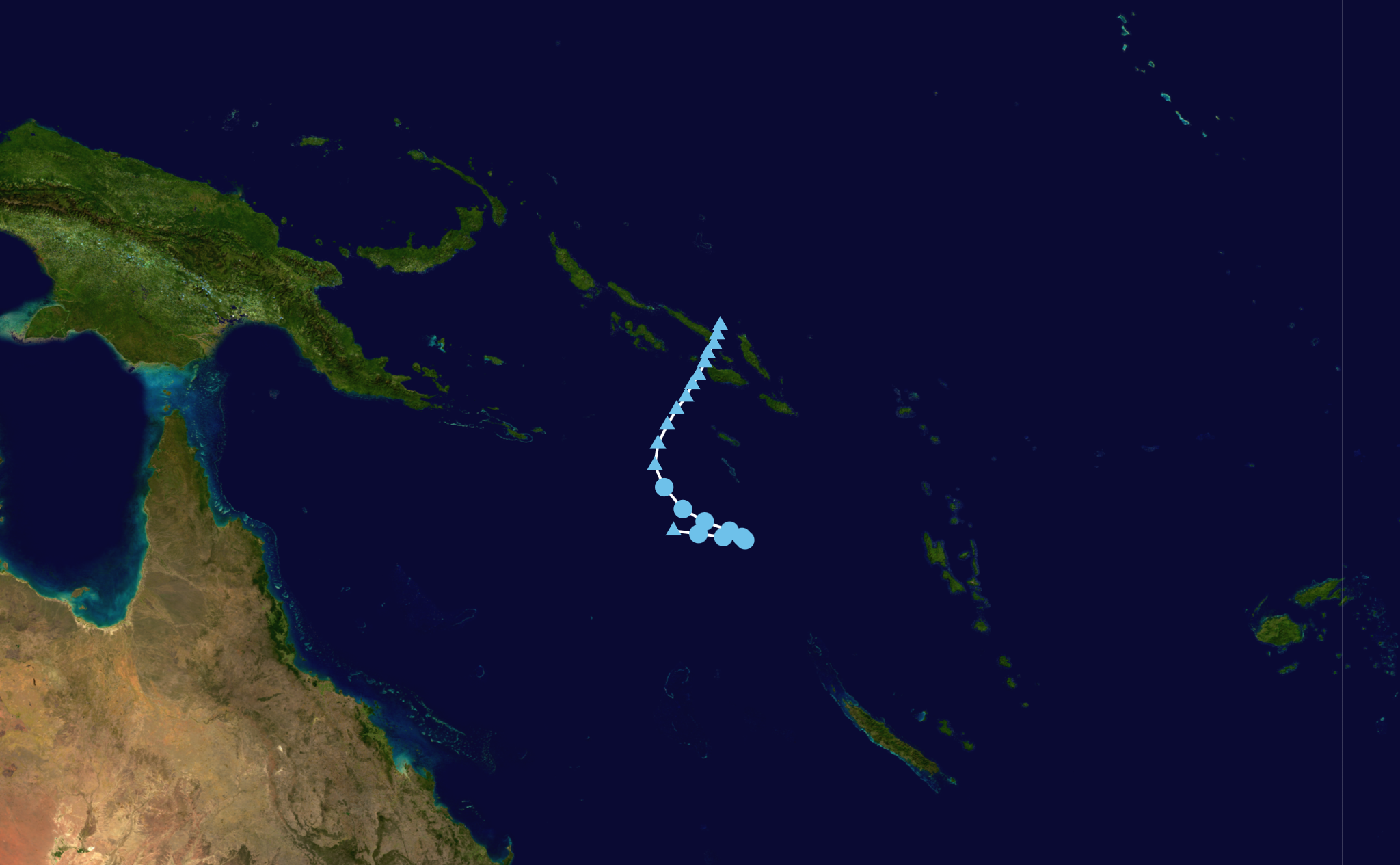
- Duration: 23 April – 25 April (Out of basin from 24-25 April)
- Peak intensity: 55 km/h (35 mph) (1-min); 1000 hPa (mbar)

On 20 April, the JTWC started to monitor an area of low pressure that located over the Solomon Islands about 155 km (95 mi) to the north of Honiara. During that day the disturbance moved towards the southeast and passed over several of the Solomon Islands, before emerging into the Australian basin. Over the next couple of days the disturbance gradually developed further while moving towards the southwest before re-curving and moving southeastwards. On 24 April, as it moved back into the South Pacific basin, the JTWC initiated advisories on the disturbance, designating it as Tropical Cyclone 29P, with peak windspeeds equivalent to a tropical depression. As the system was classified, it recurved again and started to move slowly towards the northwest, and started to feel the effects of a high amount of vertical windshear. As a result of the windshear, the center became exposed and displaced from the deep convection before the JTWC issued their final advisory on 25 April as 29P weakened into an area of low pressure, before dissipating later that day about 600 km (375 mi) to the southwest of Honiara.

=== Tropical Cyclone Willy ===
- Category 2 tropical cyclone (Australian scale)
- Tropical storm (SSHWS)
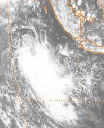
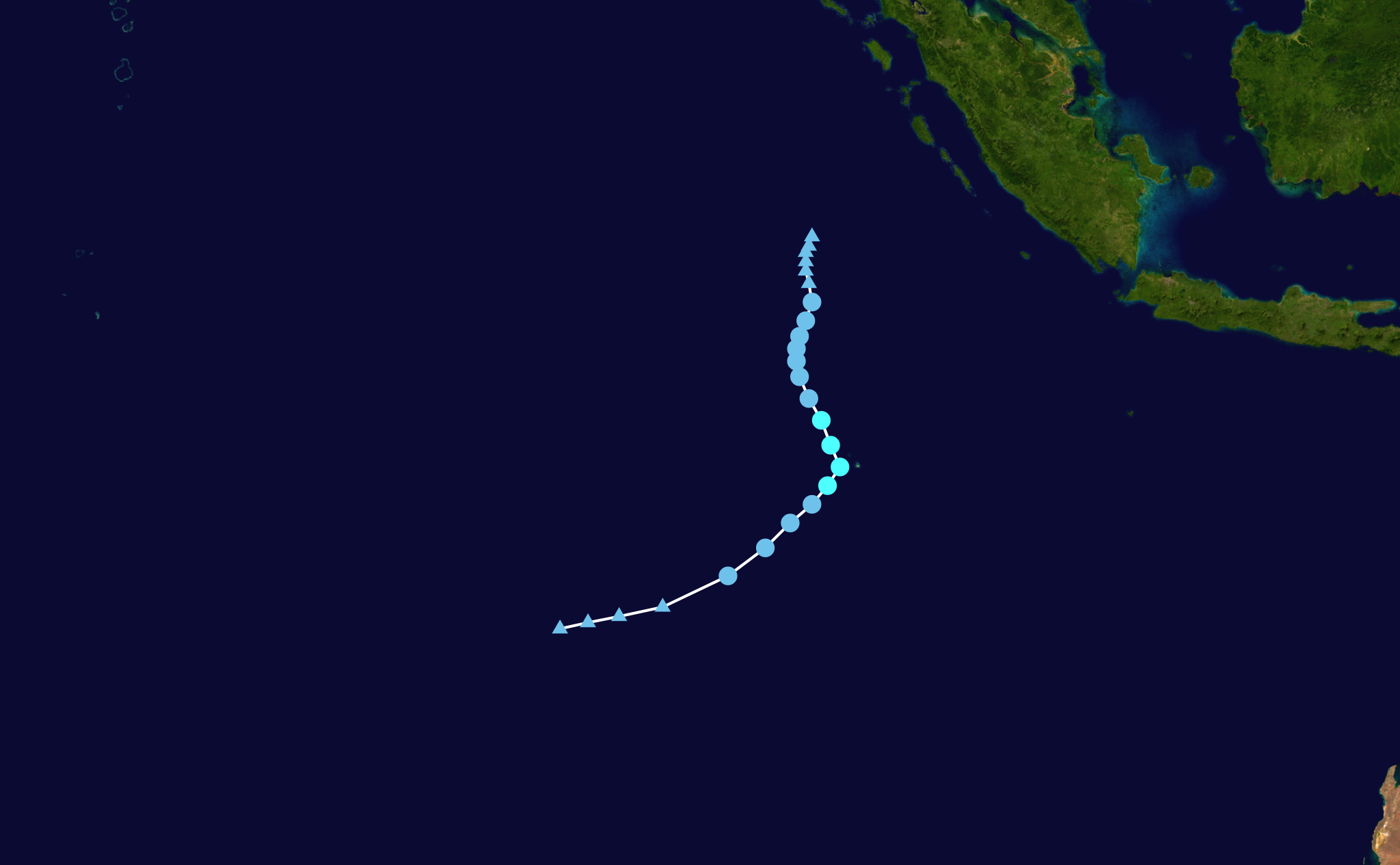
- Duration: 26 April – 1 May
- Peak intensity: 95 km/h (60 mph) (10-min); 985 hPa (mbar)

Willy was a Category 1 cyclone lasting from 26 April to 1 May 1994 that passed about 80 km west of the Cocos Islands.

=== Other systems ===
During 23 March, a weak tropical low developed within the South Pacific Convergence Zone near Papua New Guinea's Louisiade Archipelago, within an area of favourable surface and upper air conditions for further development. Over the next day the system moved eastwards and gradually developed further, before TCWC Port Moresby reported that the system had developed into a category 1 tropical cyclone on the Australian scale and named it Usha during the next day before it moved into the South Pacific tropical cyclone basin.

== Storm names ==
=== TCWC Perth ===
- Naomi
- Oscar
- Pearl
- Quenton
- Sharon
- Tim
- Vivienne
- Willy

=== TCWC Brisbane ===
- Sadie
- Theodore

== Season effects ==
Name	Dates	Peak intensity			Areas affected	Damage (USD)	Deaths	Ref(s).
Name	Dates	Category	Wind speed	Pressure	Areas affected	Damage (USD)	Deaths	Ref(s).
Naomi	14 – 18 December	Category 3 severe tropical cyclone	140 km/h (85 mph)	960 hPa (28.34 inHg)	Western Australia	Minimal	None	
Oscar	28 December – 9 January	Category 1 tropical cyclone	65 km/h (40 mph)	995 hPa (29.38 inHg)	Northern Territory, Western Australia	None	None	
Rewa	29 December – 21 January	Category 5 severe tropical cyclone	205 km/h (125 mph)	920 hPa (27.17 inHg)	Melanesia, Eastern Australia, New Zealand	Unknown	22	
Pearl-Farah	10 – 21 January	Category 3 severe tropical cyclone	120 km/h (75 mph)	960 hPa (28.34 inHg)	Western Australia	None	None	
Quenton	22 – 29 January	Category 3 severe tropical cyclone	150 km/h (90 mph)	955 hPa (28.20 inHg)	None	None	None	
Sadie	29 - 31 January	Category 1 tropical cyclone	85 km/h (50 mph)	990 hPa (29.23 inHg)	Cape York	None	None	
Unnamed	17 – 22 February 1994	Tropical Low	35–55 km/h (25–35 mph)	985 hPa (29.09 inHg)	Western Australia	Unknown	Unknown	
Theodore	22 – 26 February	Category 5 severe tropical cyclone	215 km/h (130 mph)	910 hPa (26.87 inHg)	Papua New Guinea, Solomon Islands; New Caledonia	Unknown	1	
Sharon	12 – 22 March	Category 4 severe tropical cyclone	190 km/h (115 mph)	930 hPa (27.46 inHg)	Western Australia	None	None	
Tim	28 March – 3 April	Category 1 tropical cyclone	65 km/h (40 mph)	995 hPa (29.38 inHg)	None	None	None	
Vivienne	5 – 13 April	Category 3 severe tropical cyclone	150 km/h (90 mph)	955 hPa (28.20 inHg)	None	None	None	
29P	24 – 25 April	Tropical Depression	55 km/h (35 mph)	1000 hPa (29.53 inHg)	Solomon Islands	None	None	
Willy	26 April – 2 May 1994	Category 2 tropical cyclone	95 km/h (60 mph)	985 hPa (29.09 inHg)	Cocos Islands	None	None	
Season aggregates
14 systems	14 December - 1 May		205 km/h (125 mph)	910 hPa (26.87 inHg)		Minor	22	

== See also ==
- List of Southern Hemisphere tropical cyclone seasons
- Atlantic hurricane seasons: 1993, 1994
- Pacific hurricane seasons: 1993, 1994
- Pacific typhoon seasons: 1993, 1994
- North Indian Ocean cyclone seasons: 1993, 1994
