= Tropical storms Kujira and Peilou =

Western Pacific tropical storms in 2026

Tropical Storm Kujira (Luis–Maymay) Tropical Storm Peilou
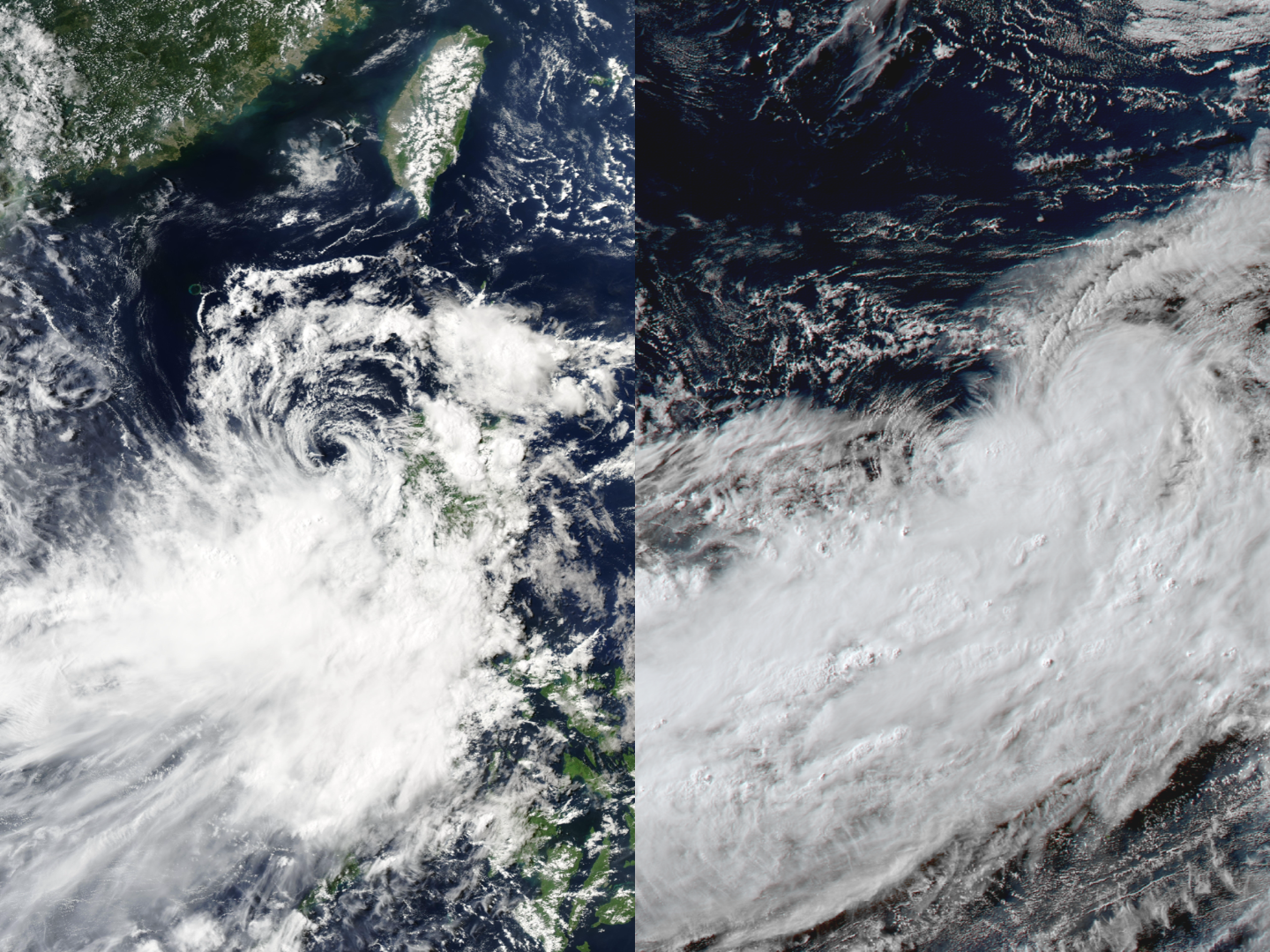
- Kujira (left) after reaching its peak intensity on August 5 and Peilou (right) a few hours after reaching its peak intensity on August 10.

Meteorological history
- as Tropical Storm Kujira
- Formed: July 31, 2026
- Dissipated: August 6, 2026

Tropical storm
- 10-minute sustained (JMA)
- Highest winds: 75 km/h (45 mph)
- Lowest pressure: 994 hPa (mbar); 29.35 inHg

Tropical storm
- 1-minute sustained (SSHWS/JTWC)
- Highest winds: 65 km/h (40 mph)
- Lowest pressure: 997 hPa (mbar); 29.44 inHg

Meteorological history
- as Tropical Storm Peilou
- Formed: August 8, 2026
- Extratropical: August 13, 2026
- Dissipated: August 16, 2026

Tropical storm
- 10-minute sustained (JMA)
- Highest winds: 85 km/h (50 mph)
- Lowest pressure: 992 hPa (mbar); 29.29 inHg

Tropical storm
- 1-minute sustained (SSHWS/JTWC)
- Highest winds: 85 km/h (50 mph)
- Lowest pressure: 993 hPa (mbar); 29.32 inHg

Overall effects
- Fatalities: 7+
- Damage: ≥$63.9 million (2026 USD)
- Areas affected: Philippines, Minamitorishima, Alaska
- Part of the 2026 Pacific typhoon season

Tropical Storm Kujira (Note: The name Kujira (Japanese: クジラ, [kɯ̟ʑiɾa̠]) was contributed by Japan and refers to the constellation Cetus, the whale, in Japanese.) and Tropical Storm Peilou, (Note: The name Peilou (Cantonese: 琵鷺, [pʰei˨˩ lou˨]) was contributed by Macau and refers to a spoonbill in Cantonese.) named Luis and Maymay respectively by PAGASA were two related, consecutive tropical cyclones that affected much of northern Luzon and enhanced the southwest monsoon over the Philippines in late July and early August 2026. The Japan Meteorological Agency (JMA) and Joint Typhoon Warning Center (JTWC) considered them to be a single system. Unofficially, the JTWC considered Kujira and Peilou to be a single system and designated the combined system as 13W. The systems were the fourteenth and sixteenth named tropical storms of the 2026 Pacific typhoon season, respectively.

Kujira was first monitored by PAGASA as a low-pressure area (LPA) outside the Philippine Area of Responsibility (PAR). The agency noted that it was unlikely to develop into a tropical depression within the next 24 hours while located approximately 2,930 km (1,820 mi) east of Eastern Visayas. On July 31, the Japan Meteorological Agency (JMA) reported the formation of an LPA and subsequently classified the system as a tropical depression. At 12:00 UTC the following day, as the system became stationary, PAGASA also classified it as a tropical depression and assigned the name Luis. The system made landfall over Maconacon, Isabela on August 3, after which PAGASA downgraded it to an LPA. The disturbance later split into two systems, with the original circulation merging with the second system several hours later. The JMA began issuing warnings for the second system at around the same time. At 20:00 PHT (12:00 UTC), the disturbance developed into a tropical depression and was retrospectively named Maymay by PAGASA. At 18:00 UTC, the JMA and PAGASA upgraded the system to a tropical storm, while the JTWC classified it as a tropical depression. The JMA assigned the name Kujira, while the JTWC designated it as 13W. Early on August 6, Kujira made its second landfall over Magsingal, Ilocos Sur. It was later absorbed by Typhoon Dolphin, leaving behind a trough.

On August 8, the trough separated from Typhoon Dolphin, prompting the JMA to upgrade it to a tropical depression. Later that day, the JTWC followed suit but retained the designation 13W, considering the system a redevelopment of Kujira. On August 9, the JMA and PAGASA upgraded the system to a tropical storm, and the JMA assigned it the name Peilou. However, the system later encountered unfavorable conditions and weakened into a tropical depression according to the JTWC. The JTWC subsequently noted that it had begun extratropical transition. On August 14, the JMA reported the development of fronts associated with the system. Later that day, the system crossed the anti-meridian.

== Meteorological history ==
=== Kujira ===
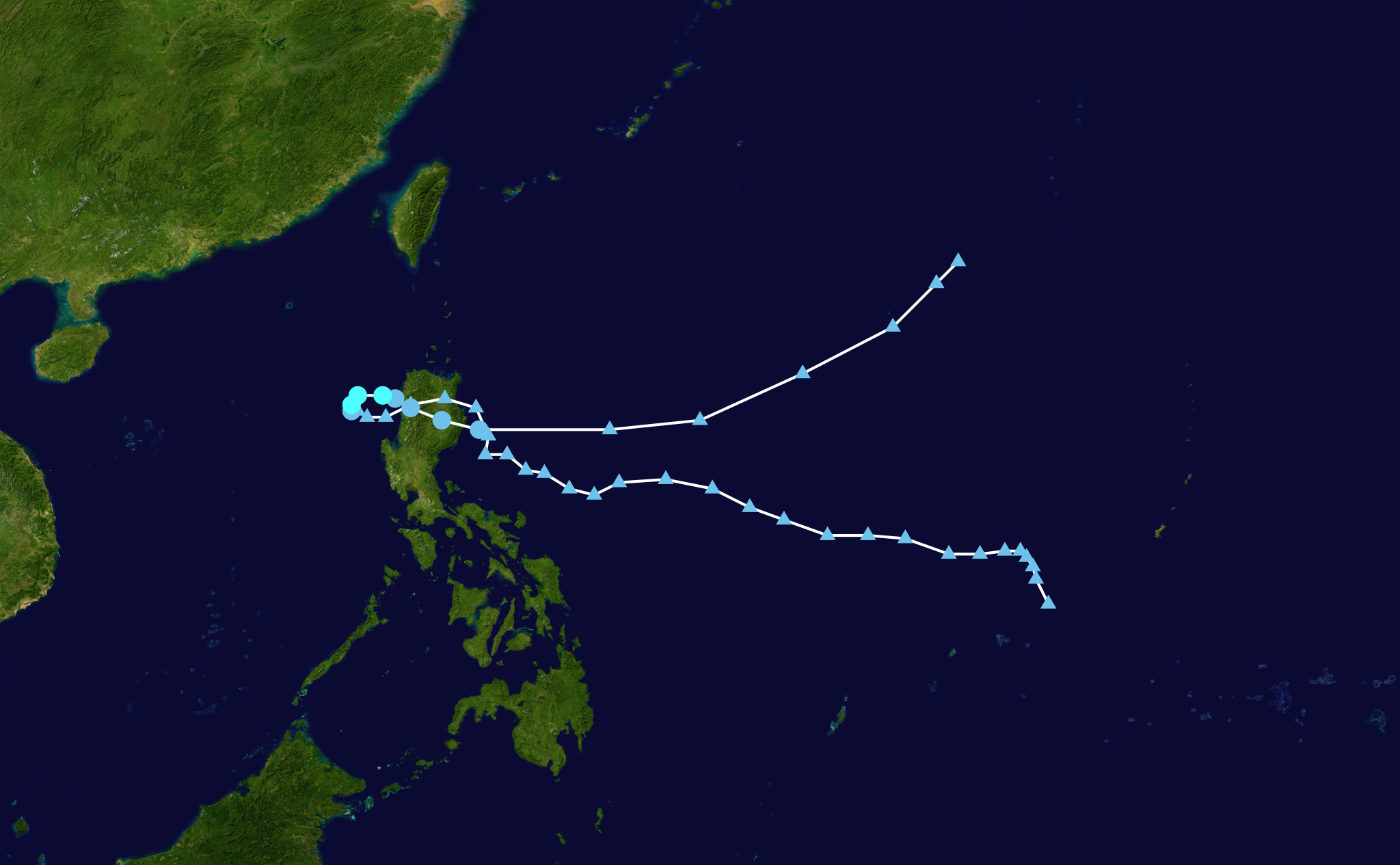
Map plotting the storm's track and intensity, according to the Saffir–Simpson scale Map key Saffir–Simpson scale Tropical depression (≤38 mph, ≤62 km/h) Tropical storm (39–73 mph, 63–118 km/h) Category 1 (74–95 mph, 119–153 km/h) Category 2 (96–110 mph, 154–177 km/h) Category 3 (111–129 mph, 178–208 km/h) Category 4 (130–156 mph, 209–251 km/h) Category 5 (≥157 mph, ≥252 km/h) Unknown Storm type Tropical cyclone Subtropical cyclone Extratropical cyclone, remnant low, tropical disturbance, or monsoon depression

On July 29, PAGASA began monitoring a low-pressure area (LPA) outside the Philippine Area of Responsibility (PAR), noting that it was unlikely to develop into a tropical depression within the next 24 hours while located approximately 2,930 km (1,820 mi) east of Eastern Visayas. On July 31, the Japan Meteorological Agency (JMA) reported that a low-pressure area had formed and subsequently upgraded the system to a tropical depression. The agency then classified it as a tropical depression on the following day, at 12:00 UTC, as the system became stationary. That same time, PAGASA followed suit, assigning it the name Luis. By 18:00 UTC, the United States Joint Typhoon Warning Center (JTWC) began tracking the system, noting that convection was occurring in an environment of low to moderate wind shear, warm sea surface temperatures, and good equatorward outflow aloft. The system then started to slowly move westwards along the southern periphery of a mid-level subtropical high. Early on August 2, microwave imagery displayed active convective cloud clusters around the cloud system center (CSC).By 06:00 UTC, Luis began shifting northwestwards, while maintaining its intensity due to the limited firmness of its structure. The JMA issued their final warning on the system by 18:00 UTC. However, at 19:30 UTC, the JTWC issued a Tropical Cyclone Formation Alert (TCFA) for the system, citing a possible chance of developing into a tropical cyclone within 12 to 24 hours, although it was inside unfavorable conditions for development due to moderate vertical wind shear and dry air. The system made landfall over Maconacon, Isabela on August 3 at 17:30 PHT (9:30 UTC). Later at 20:00 PHT (12:00 UTC), PAGASA downgraded Luis into an LPA.

The system later split into two, the original system merged with the second system a few hours later. The JMA also started issuing warnings for the second system at the same time. The JTWC also upgraded its chances to high and issued a TCFA again after it moved into more favorable conditions. At 20:00 PHT (12:00 UTC), the disturbance developed into a tropical depression and was retrospectively renamed Maymay by PAGASA. At 18:00 UTC, both the JMA and PAGASA upgraded it to a tropical storm and JTWC upgraded it to a tropical depression, therefore being assigned the name Kujira by JMA and the designation 13W from JTWC, respectively. Early on August 6, at 02:00 PHT (18:00 UTC of the previous day), Kujira made its second landfall over Magsingal, Ilocos Sur. Later, the JMA, JTWC and PAGASA all downgraded the system to a tropical depression and JMA later stated it dissipated. The following day, the system weakened into an remnant low over the Philippine sea and later it dissipated according to PAGASA. Kujira was later absorbed into Typhoon Dolphin and became a trough.

=== Peilou ===
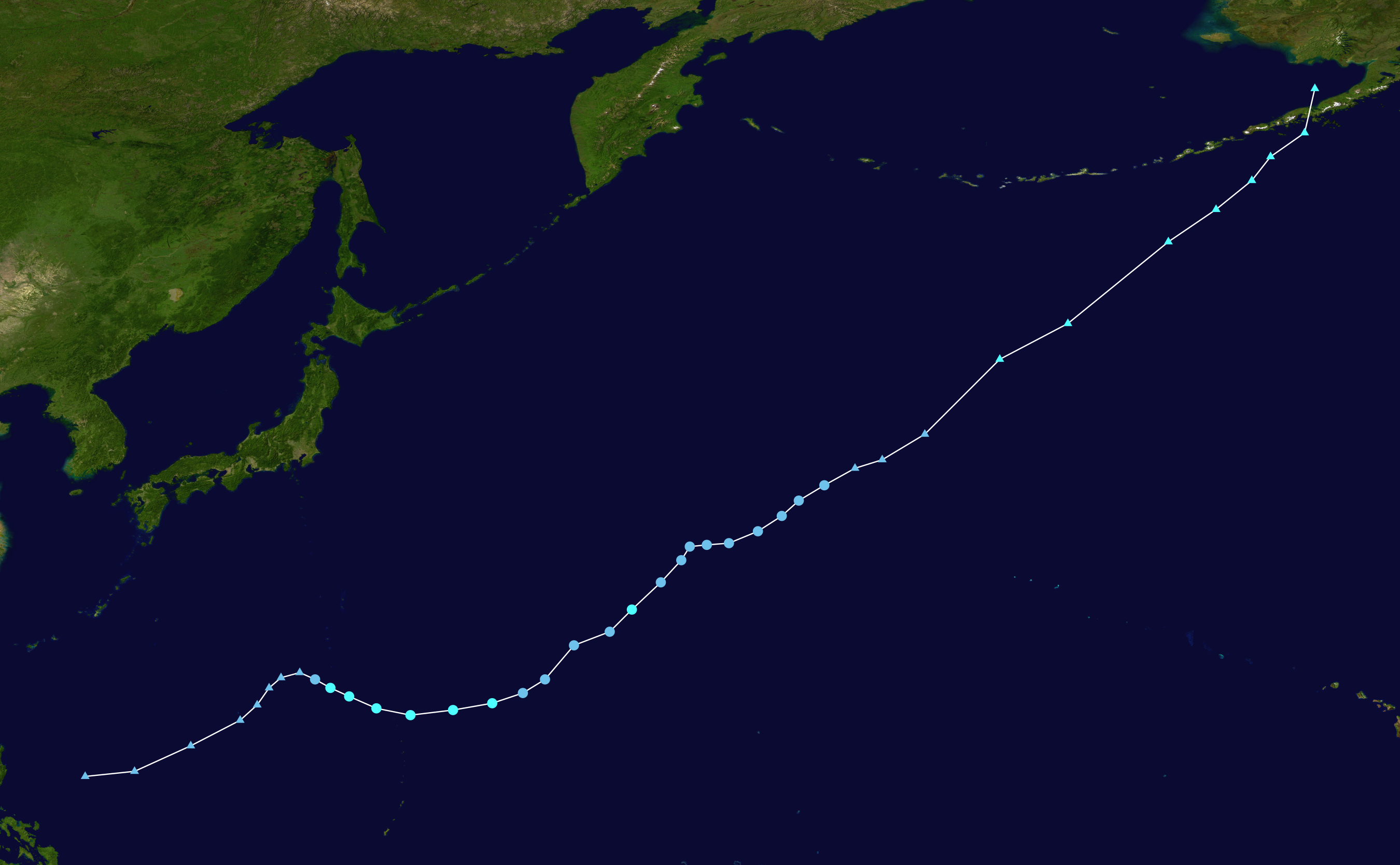
Map plotting the storm's track and intensity, according to the Saffir–Simpson scale Map key Saffir–Simpson scale Tropical depression (≤38 mph, ≤62 km/h) Tropical storm (39–73 mph, 63–118 km/h) Category 1 (74–95 mph, 119–153 km/h) Category 2 (96–110 mph, 154–177 km/h) Category 3 (111–129 mph, 178–208 km/h) Category 4 (130–156 mph, 209–251 km/h) Category 5 (≥157 mph, ≥252 km/h) Unknown Storm type Tropical cyclone Subtropical cyclone Extratropical cyclone, remnant low, tropical disturbance, or monsoon depression

On August 8, the trough split from Typhoon Dolphin and the JMA upgraded it to a tropical depression. Later that day, the JTWC followed suit, but its designation was kept the same as that of Kujira, stating that it is a redevelopment of Kujira. PAGASA later followed suit, classifying it as a depression as well. On August 9, both the JMA and PAGASA upgraded the system into a tropical storm, with the system being assigned the name Peilou by the JMA. The JTWC later followed suit and continued the sequence of bulletins and track forecasts previously issued for Kujira. Peilou slowly intensified, reaching 85 km/h and a central pressure of 992 mbar on August 10 at 12:00 UTC. But it reached unfavorable conditions later that day and downgraded into a tropical depression according to the JTWC. The JMA followed suit on August 12, downgrading Peilou to a tropical depression on its final prognostic reasoning of the system. The following day, the JMA downgraded the system to an LPA. Later that day, the JTWC noted that it began extratropical transition, still classifying it as a tropical depression. On August 14, the JMA noted that fronts had developed on the system. Later that day, the JMA reported that the system crossed the anti-meridian.

== Preparations and impact ==
=== Kujira ===
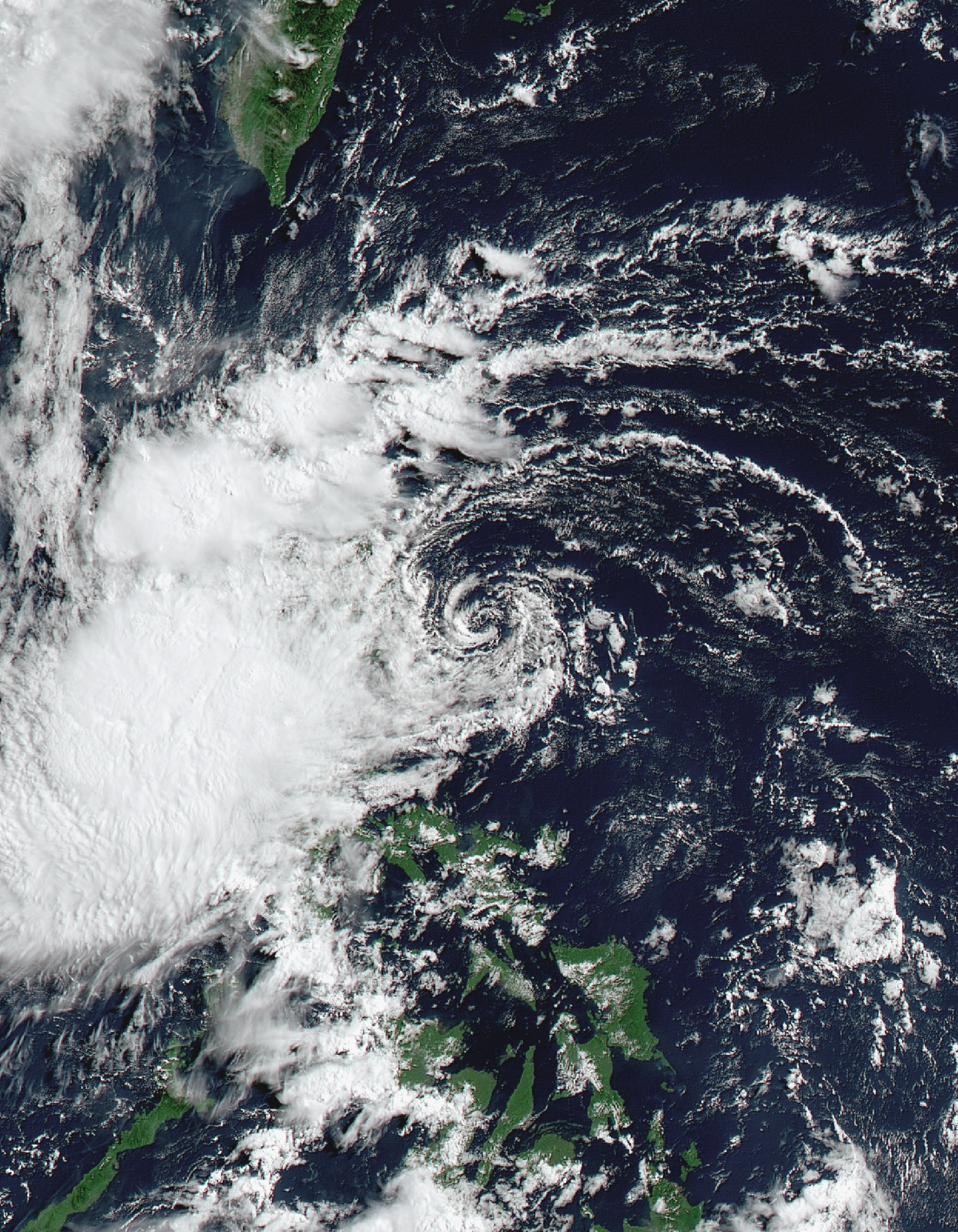
Tropical Depression Luis (pre-Kujira), east of Luzon on August 3, 2026

Late on August 1, at 23:00 PHT (15:00 UTC), PAGASA issued Tropical Cyclone Wind Signal No. 1 in the Polillo Islands, and the northern portions of Camarines Norte and Catanduanes. On the following day, Signal No. 1 was issued in the entire province of Catanduanes, and the northern portion of Camarines Sur at 05:00 PHT (21:00 UTC of the previous day). Signal No. 1 was further extended to Isabela, Quirino, the northern portion of Aurora, and the southern portion of Cagayan at 23:00 PHT (15:00 UTC), On August 3, at 02:00 PHT (18:00 UTC of the previous day), Signal No. 1 was extended again to the eastern portions of Cagayan, Ifugao, Kalinga, and Mountain Province, and the eastern and southern portions of Apayao.At 17:00 PHT (09:00 UTC), Signal No. 1 was further issued in the eastern and southern portions of the Babuyan Islands. All wind signals were halted at 23:00 PHT (15:00 UTC) as PAGASA downgraded it into an LPA.

On August 2, the Philippine Coast Guard (PCG) in Catanduanes temporarily suspended sea travel to and from the province, while deployable response groups were activated for them to immediately respond to maritime emergencies. On August 3, the PCG station in Occidental Mindoro activated its Deployable Response Group in anticipation of the system's possible effects, as its personnel, rescue assets and equipment, and humanitarian assistance are accordingly on standby. Residents of Tuba, Benguet were advised to prepare emergency go-bags and to monitor official PAGASA and municipal advisories. Water-related activities and small-scale mining operations were also suspended in the municipality. The Department of Social Welfare and Development (DSWD) stockpiled at least 4.9 million family food packs that are prepositioned across more than 1,000 warehouses in the country. On August 4 at 23:00 PHT (15:00 UTC), PAGASA issued signal 1 warnings at much of the Ilocos Region, Cordillera Administrative Region, the western portions of Cagayan Valley, and the northern portions of Central Luzon. The following day at 5:00 PHT (21:00 UTC on August 4), PAGASA raised signal 2 warnings at the central portion of the Ilocos region and the western portions of the Cordillera Administrative region as the system got upgraded to a tropical storm, with signal 1 warnings being issued at the rest of the Ilocos Region and Cagayan Valley, as well as the northern portion of Central Luzon.

Heavy rainfall was expected to hit the country, with orange rainfall warnings put in place at Benguet, La Union, Pangasinan, and Zambales. Meanwhile, yellow rainfall warnings were issued over much of Luzon, including Metro Manila. Sea travel was halted in Aurora, Cagayan, and Zambales as the system was anticipated to bring rough sea conditions. A gale warning was put in place across the western seaboard of Northern Luzon, along with waves of up to 5 meters being forecasted along the coast of Ilocos Sur, La Union, and Pangasinan. Government work and classes of all levels were suspended in Abra, Benguet, Ilocos Sur, La Union, Metro Manila, Pangasinan, and Zambales. Kujira caused heavy rainfall that triggered landslides and rockfalls. In Aurora province, rocks were loosened from the continuous rainfall and obstructed traffic on a road in Barangay Dianed, Dipaculao. Affected families were reported in Bicol, Zamboanga, and BARMM, with seven areas getting flooded in Zamboanga Peninsula and BARMM.

In total, 23 people died and 17 were injured as a result of the storm and the southwest monsoon, with Benguet reporting the most fatalities at 15. The system in tandem with the southwest monsoon brought more than a week's rain in two days over northern and Central Luzon. In Baguio City, eleven days' worth of August rain amounting to 355.2mm fell from August 5 to August 7. Over 5 million people were affected as a result of the storm and enhanced southwest monsoon. The Department of Agriculture (DA) reported that the rains from the system combined with the southwest monsoon caused ₱689.66 million in agricultural damages, with Oriental and Occidental Mindoro reporting ₱56 million and ₱21.86 million respectively. Infrastructure damage from the storm and southwest monsoon was estimated to be ₱3.3 billion, with at least 1,800 houses being damaged.

== See also ==
- Weather of 2026
- Tropical cyclones in 2026
- Typhoon Flo (1993) – a minimal but destructive typhoon which executed a loop around the same general area as Kujira.
- Tropical Storm Maysak (2008) – the most recent tropical cyclone to receive two Philippine names prior to Kujira.
- Typhoon Parma (2009) – a stronger typhoon which also did a loop around the northwestern portion of the Philippines.
- Tropical Storm Co-May (2025) – another storm that executed a loop around the Ilocos Region.
