= Typhoon Flo (1993) =

Pacific typhoon in 1993

Typhoon Flo (Kadiang)
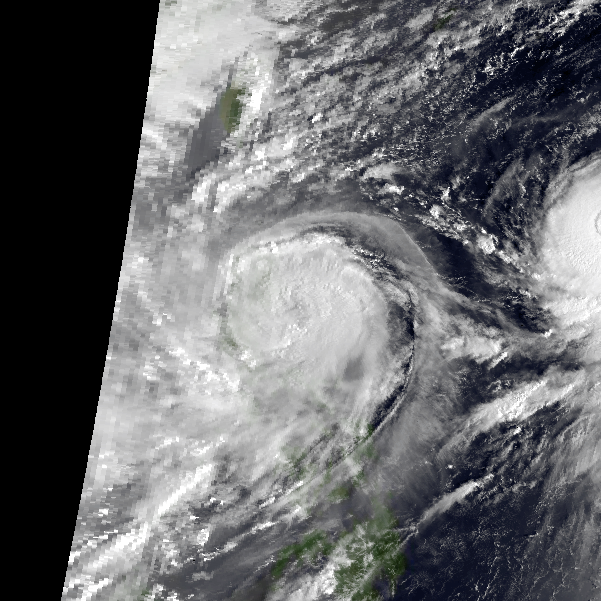
- Satellite image of Typhoon Flo approaching the Philippines on October 4, with Typhoon Ed to its east

Meteorological history
- Formed: October 1, 1993
- Extratropical: October 8, 1993
- Dissipated: October 11, 1993

Typhoon
- 10-minute sustained (JMA)
- Highest winds: 120 km/h (75 mph)
- Lowest pressure: 970 hPa (mbar); 28.64 inHg

Category 1-equivalent typhoon
- 1-minute sustained (SSHWS/JTWC)
- Highest winds: 130 km/h (80 mph)

Overall effects
- Fatalities: 576
- Damage: $188 million (1993 USD)
- Areas affected: Philippines
- Part of the 1993 Pacific typhoon season

Typhoon Flo, known in the Philippines as Typhoon Kadiang, was an erratic, catastrophic and deadly minimal typhoon that hit the northern Philippines during October 1993. It also caused the largest 72-hour forecast error for the year due to its interaction with the nearby Super Typhoon Ed. The twenty-seventh depression, twenty-second named storm and the eleventh typhoon of the 1993 Pacific typhoon season, Flo originated from an area of convection that was embedded from a monsoon trough during September 28. Two days later, a tropical depression formed within this trough, to the west of Guam. Slowly organizing, it remained a tropical depression until on October 2, when it strengthened to a tropical storm and was given the name Flo by the Japan Meteorological Agency. Slight wind shear from nearby Ed inhibited development; however, it intensified to a minimal typhoon as it neared the coastline of Luzon. On October 3, it made landfall near the Isabela-Aurora in its peak. It then crossed the country while weakening, and moved ashore near the South China Sea the next morning. It then unexpectedly moved back to the country due to its interaction with Ed, and it moved back to the Philippine Sea on October 17 before accelerating to the south of Japan. It then became extratropical on the next day.

Flo caused over 500 deaths, mainly due to flash floods. Some houses were also buried in mud due to the lahar released by Mount Pinatubo. The total damages from the typhoon were finalized at $188 million (1993 USD).

== Meteorological history ==
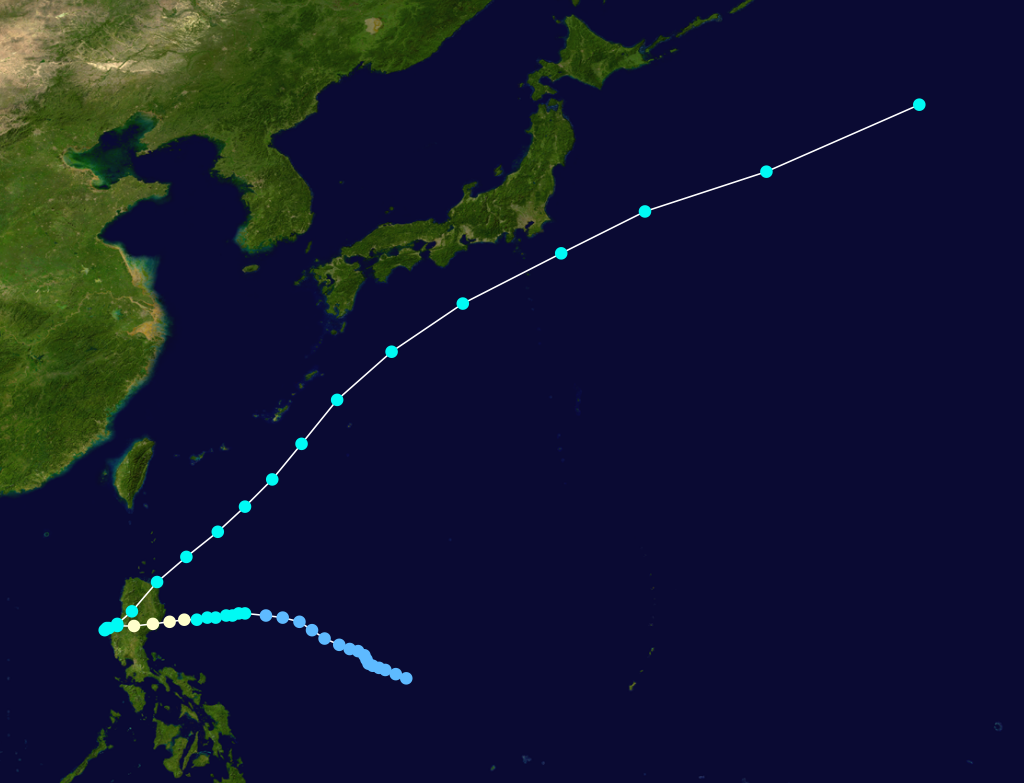
Map plotting the storm's track and intensity, according to the Saffir–Simpson scale Map key Saffir–Simpson scale Tropical depression (≤38 mph, ≤62 km/h) Tropical storm (39–73 mph, 63–118 km/h) Category 1 (74–95 mph, 119–153 km/h) Category 2 (96–110 mph, 154–177 km/h) Category 3 (111–129 mph, 178–208 km/h) Category 4 (130–156 mph, 209–251 km/h) Category 5 (≥157 mph, ≥252 km/h) Unknown Storm type Tropical cyclone Subtropical cyclone Extratropical cyclone, remnant low, tropical disturbance, or monsoon depression

A persistent and broad area of convection was first mentioned by the Joint Typhoon Warning Center (JTWC) on September 28 for possible tropical cyclogenesis, to the northwest of Palau. It slowly moved to the northwest while becoming well defined, and a Tropical Cyclone Formation Alert (TCFA) was issued on the afternoon of September 30. The disturbance had a blossoming convection surrounding its low-level circulation center at that time. The next day, the Japan Meteorological Agency (JMA) reported that the area of convection coalesced to a tropical depression, located approximately 970 km to the east-northeast of Manila, Philippines. On the same day, the JTWC followed suit and gave the system its identifier 22W. The PAGASA also declared the system a tropical depression at that time in the Philippine Area of Responsibility and was provided the name Kadiang. The storm intensified overnight in the Philippine Sea and early the next day, the JMA, JTWC and the PAGASA declared it a tropical storm, with the former giving it the name Flo. At this time, Flo was located in a marginally favorable environment for further strengthening, with warm sea surface temperatures and good outflow, being offset by moderate wind shear from the nearby Ed, which was impacting Guam at that time. Its central dense overcast also became defined on satellite imagery, sign that the system was strengthening. Also at that day, the JMA upgraded the system to a severe tropical storm, with its ragged eye emerging. The PAGASA also followed at that time. Forecasts shows that Flo will move away from the Philippines; however, the system accelerated to the west, nearing the coastline of Isabela. On the next day, the JTWC upgraded Flo to a typhoon, with the JMA and the PAGASA following suit. At that time, the system is approaching the Aurora-Quezon border. It soon reached its peak intensity, having maximum sustained winds of 120 km/h (75 mph) and a minimum pressure of 970 hPa, while nearing landfall. It made landfall on the afternoon of the same day near the Isabela-Aurora border, moving slightly to the north-northwest. It traversed the Northern Luzon that night, while weakening to a severe tropical storm. On October 5, it moved ashore on Lingayen Gulf, before moving on the South China Sea by the afternoon. Interaction with Ed, which was located to the south of Japan and a high pressure over South China forced Flo to undergo a cyclonic loop near Pangasinan before making landfall again near Bolinao before dawn, as a high-end tropical storm. At first, Flo is forecasted to move through the west, making landfall in South China; however, due to these circumstances, the system accelerated even closer to the country. Moving to the northeast, it made another and last landfall near San Fernando, La Union at night. On the next morning, Flo has exited the Philippines landmass, before passing near the Nansei Islands, just before starting its extratropical transition. At 18:00 UTC of October 18, it then fully became extratropical near Japan. The remnants of the system accelerated to the north-northeast, before dissipating on 06:00 UTC of October 11 over the Sea of Okhotsk.

== Preparations ==
As Flo approaches the Philippines, all the domestic and international flights at Ninoy Aquino International Airport were cancelled and over 3,000 families were evacuated. Some residents near the mountains and lahar-threatened communities were also forced to leave. Military trucks were also dispatched to help the evacuees and rescue equipment were readied in case of flash floods. Sea vessels and large cargo boats were advised to dock in a safe place due to possible storm surge and the Department of Education suspended primary and secondary classes. Isabela, Cagayan, Ifugao, and several other nearby provinces, including the populous Metro Manila have been placed on storm alerts. Government offices were also suspended. The Philippine President at that time, Fidel V. Ramos, approved ₱10.2 million ($360,000) from the calamity fund for food packs that would be given to the evacuees.

== Impact ==
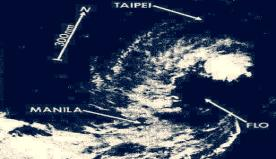
Flo inland on October 5

Between 02:00 and 04:00 UTC, Flo (known as Kadiang in the Philippines) made landfall between Isabela and Aurora coastline, causing large storm surges. At least 576 died, and both an unknown number of missing and injured were reported from the typhoon. In the capital Manila, strong winds broke the moorings of a barge and another small freighter, pushing them to the shorelines of the Roxas Boulevard. The capital also experienced 93 mph winds from the storm. Two more fishing ships, MV Camiguan and MV Uniselva, were also washed out in the shores off Manila Bay due to storm surges. Mudflows from Mount Pinatubo were also triggered by the typhoon, inundating houses in Pampanga. Over 40,000 hectares of farmland were also destroyed and/or flooded in Central and Northern Luzon. Widespread flooding were also reported at these areas, including some parts of Calabarzon and Metro Manila. Adding on, over 384,802 families were affected.

As reported by the National Disaster Coordinating Council, the total damages from the typhoon were estimated at ₱5.3 billion ($188 million, 2005 USD). The total deaths were finalized from 86 to 576 individuals, making it one of the deadliest tropical cyclones to hit the country.

== Aftermath ==
=== International aid ===
- United Nations:
  - United Nations Children's Fund (UNICEF): Essential supplies and health kits, blankets, mats, jerrycans and tarpaulins. Also donated $296,715 to the country.
- Japan: Donated $200,000 to the government.

President Fidel Ramos declared vast majority of Northern Luzon in state of calamity due to the catastrophic effects of Flo in the Philippines. The president also approved $1.35 million for agricultural rehabilitation.

However, these efforts were halted as Typhoon Ira of early-November of the same season caused heavy destruction towards the country.

== See also ==
- Typhoon Kyle (Luring; 1993) – a tropical disturbance which hit southern Philippines a few weeks after Flo.
- Typhoon Lola (Monang; 1993) – a late-season typhoon which also struck Luzon two months after Flo.
- Typhoon Parma (Pepeng; 2009) – a powerful typhoon which, like Flo, had an erratic track over northern Luzon.
