= Typhoon Manny =

Pacific typhoon in 1993

Typhoon Manny (Naning)
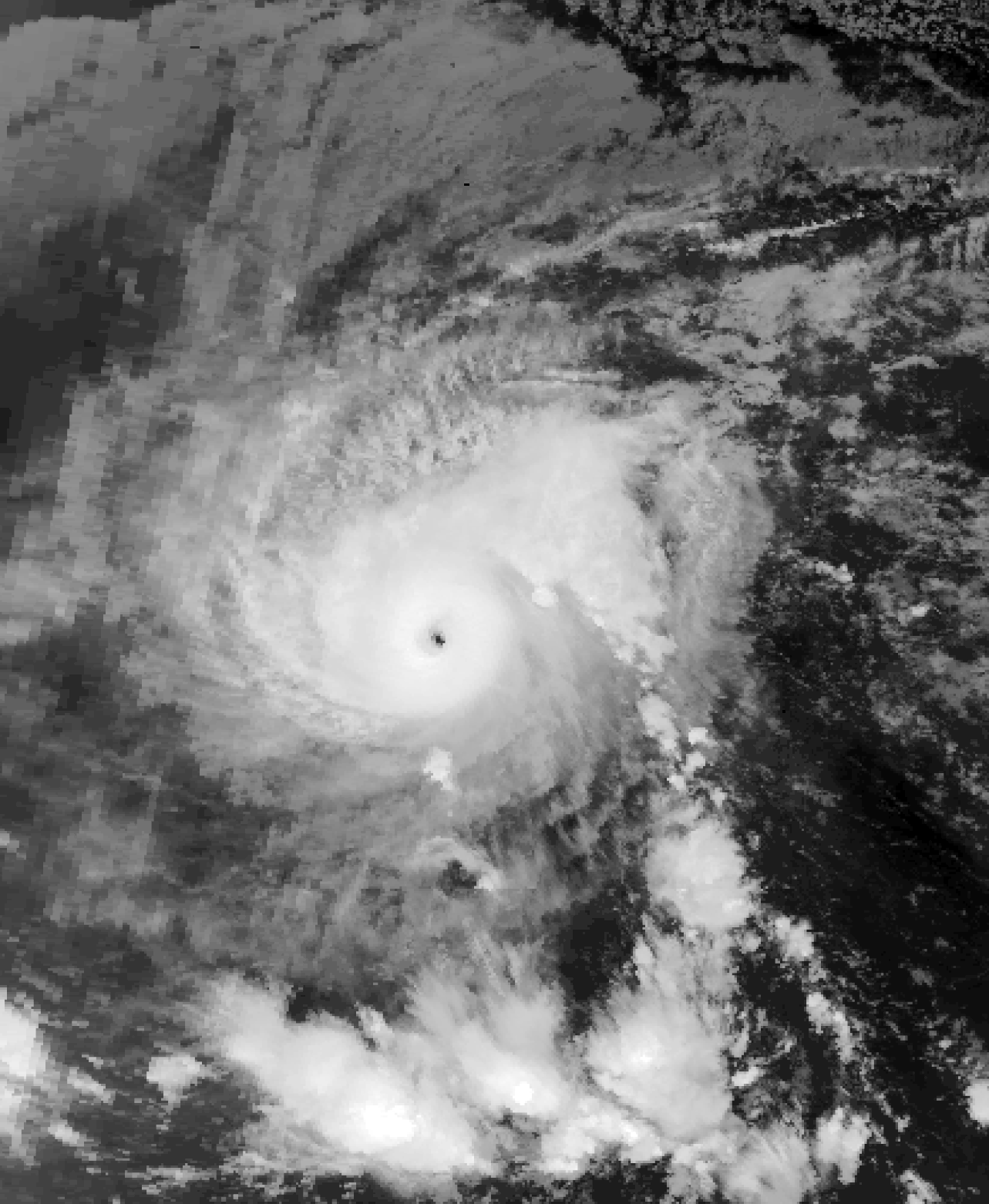
- Typhoon Manny nearing landfall in the Philippines on December 9

Meteorological history
- Formed: December 3, 1993
- Dissipated: December 16, 1993

Typhoon
- 10-minute sustained (JMA)
- Highest winds: 140 km/h (85 mph)
- Lowest pressure: 960 hPa (mbar); 28.35 inHg

Category 4-equivalent typhoon
- 1-minute sustained (SSHWS/JTWC)
- Highest winds: 220 km/h (140 mph)
- Lowest pressure: 920 hPa (mbar); 27.17 inHg

Overall effects
- Fatalities: 245 total
- Missing: 60
- Damage: >$50 million (1993 USD)
- Areas affected: Chuuk State; Northern Mariana Islands; Caroline Islands; Philippines; Vietnam; Thailand
- Part of the 1993 Pacific typhoon season

Typhoon Manny, locally named Naning, was a long-lived and deadly tropical cyclone that struck the Philippines during the 1993 Pacific typhoon season. It was the second typhoon to hit the Visayas, in the central Philippines, that year, following Kyle. The twenty-ninth named storm and fifteenth typhoon of the season, the system formed from a near-equatorial trough that also spawned Lola during the month in the east Caroline Islands on December 3. Moving northwestwards, it strengthened to a tropical storm on the next day before intensifying further to a severe tropical storm that night. The system attained typhoon status on December 8, while making an anticyclonic loop, nearly the same as Pamela, 11 years later. It then rapidly intensified while moving to the southwest, with the typhoon reaching its peak of 220 km/h (135 mph) and an unusually high barometric pressure of 960 mbar before crossing the central Philippines on December 10 and 11. It soon moved through the South China Sea as a tropical storm before weakening to a tropical depression as it encountered high wind shear. However, it restrengthened back to a tropical storm as it moved back again to a favorable environment before passing to the south of Vietnam as the system weakened back below gale-force winds. It then dissipated on December 16 as it passed through Thailand.

On Yap, Manny produced some minor damages to trees, while causing some squally rains. In the Philippines, Naning claimed at least 245 lives, and caused widespread flooding and landslides across Visayas and Mimaropa; however, the capital Manila was spared. There were no reports of damages in Vietnam and Thailand; however, the latter saw some low-lying floods. The total damages from Manny were estimated at $50 million (1993 USD).

== Meteorological history ==
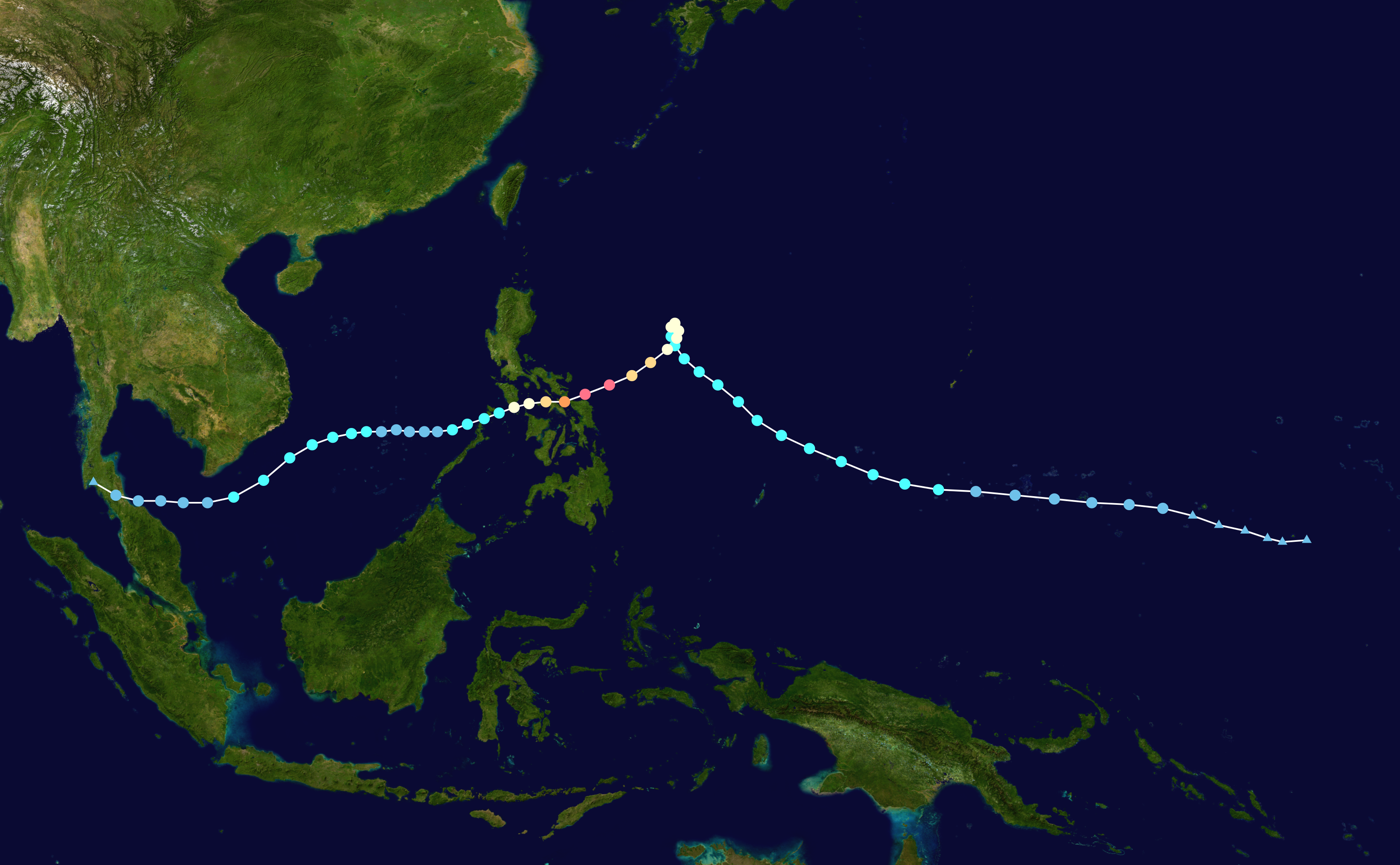
Map plotting the storm's track and intensity, according to the Saffir–Simpson scale Map key Saffir–Simpson scale Tropical depression (≤38 mph, ≤62 km/h) Tropical storm (39–73 mph, 63–118 km/h) Category 1 (74–95 mph, 119–153 km/h) Category 2 (96–110 mph, 154–177 km/h) Category 3 (111–129 mph, 178–208 km/h) Category 4 (130–156 mph, 209–251 km/h) Category 5 (≥157 mph, ≥252 km/h) Unknown Storm type Tropical cyclone Subtropical cyclone Extratropical cyclone, remnant low, tropical disturbance, or monsoon depression

The Joint Typhoon Warning Center (JTWC) started to monitor an area of convection embedded from a near-equatorial trough, near Tofol in Kosrae State on December 1. At this time, the disturbance is in a marginally favorable environment, including warm sea surface temperatures and radial outflow, being offset by high wind shear, as being evidenced by satellite imagery. On the next day, the organization of the disturbance became well-defined, with the JTWC first mentioning the system in their Significant Tropical Weather Advisory, while located to the east of Pohnpei, Caroline Islands. However, as the disturbance entered yet again a hostile environment, the system became disorganized on satellite imagery as the convection became sheared to the east of its supposed low-level circulation center. Early on December 3, the Japan Meteorological Agency (JMA) issued their first advisory on the system, first monitoring it as a disturbance. Three hours later, at 03:00 UTC, the JTWC issued a Tropical Cyclone Formation Alert on the disturbance, despite the highly disorganized nature of the system. At 06:00 UTC of the same day, the agency upgraded the system to a tropical depression, most likely based on estimates of 25 knots and surface synoptic data from the Carolines. Nine hours later, the depression's organization became defined again as being evidenced on satellite photos.

At 18:00 UTC of the next day, the JTWC upgraded the system to a tropical storm, based on its estimates of 85 km/h (55 mph); however, it was deemed that the system may have intensified, six hours later. At that time, the storm started to move to the northwest, due to a high pressure situated on Indonesia. The JMA upgraded the system to a tropical storm only six hours later and had a slightly low estimate of 65 km/h (40 mph). The former also gave the name Manny on the intensifying system. The storm began to slow down as it continued northwestward before strengthening to a severe tropical storm at 12:00 UTC of the next day. At this time, Manny entered the Philippine Area of Responsibility and was locally named Naning by the PAGASA. There, the local meteorological forecasters depicted of a possible landfall in Luzon between December 9 and 10, while Lola is devastating the country.

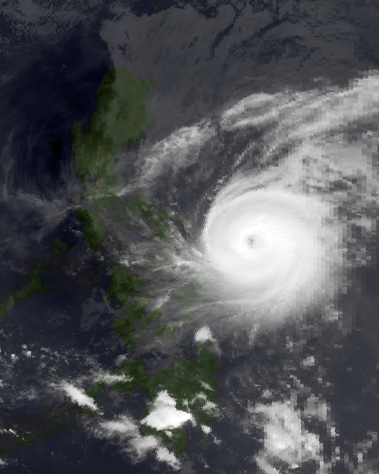
Manny at peak intensity on December 9

On December 7, Manny began making an anticyclonic loop while located approximately 950 km to the east of the Philippine capital Manila. While looping, the system intensified to a typhoon with an evidence of a ragged, but small eye and estimates of 75 knots, early on the next day. The interesting but unusual loop executed by Manny was nearly the same as Pamela in the 1982 season (though Pamela completed the circle faster than Manny). As it completed the loop on December 9, the system further intensified to a mid-level typhoon as it started to rapidly intensify. In the warm waters of the Philippine Sea, the system explosively strengthened to its peak of 220 km/h (135 mph) and a minimum barometric pressure of 920 mbar while moving south-southwestward, which is equivalent to a violent Category 4 major typhoon on the Saffir-Simpson Scale. Its eye also became well-defined and the system became compact in size.

Shortly after peaking, Manny started to weaken as it encountered wind shear, although it remained a major typhoon until it made landfall somewhere near Bobon and Catarman in Northern Samar between 23:00 UTC of December 9 and 02:00 UTC of the next day. On mid-morning, it moved through the Samar Sea as it made another landfall on the island municipality of Capul, still in Northern Samar. As it moved to the west, the typhoon started to rapidly weaken, passing through the island of Masbate as a Category 3 typhoon before arriving again in the Sibuyan Sea. It then passed through/near the islands of Sibuyan and Tablas of Romblon as a mid-level typhoon before arriving in the Tablas Strait. Manny further degraded to a Category 1 typhoon as the convection became disorganized while traversing the central Philippines. Its final landfall were near Bulalacao in Oriental Mindoro before arriving in waters, at Mindoro Strait. It then shifted its movement to the south-southwest, skirting the north and northeastern coasts of Palawan on December 11 as a tropical storm before moving through the South China Sea. It passed through some islands and reefs of Spratly Islands before weakening further to a tropical depression later that night, likely due to the leftover moisture from just the dissipated Lola. The JMA issued their final warning on the system on 00:00 UTC of December 12; however, the JTWC continued to monitor the system for possible restrengthening.

As a highly disorganized system, Manny remained weak and ill of convection due to the northeast monsoon. The system, simultaneously, exited the PAR, with the PAGASA issuing their final warning. After a day of meandering while over the South China Sea, Manny unexpectedly restrengthened to a tropical storm on December 13 near the waters of Vietnam, with bursts of scattered convection struggling to consolidate in its center, as being evidenced on satellite imagery. The JMA began to reissue their warnings on the system at 06:00 UTC of that day. The storm began to reorganize slightly while moving to the south-southwest, sparing Vietnam from its effects before peaking as a minimal storm. It peaked on 18:00 UTC, with the JTWC at 40 knots, while JMA at 35 knots. Continuous effects of wind shear, altogether with unfavorable sea surface temperatures and poor outflow gradually weakened Manny, with the JMA issuing their final warning at 00:00 UTC of December 14, while the JTWC continued issuing bulletins on the system until it dissipated at 06:00 UTC as it made landfall in Thailand.

== Preparations ==
There were no reports of preparations from Tropical Storm Manny in Yap, Chuuk and Pohnpei as they forecasted it to move safely through these islands.

Since December 10, the meteorological forecasters, including the Philippine Atmospheric, Geophysical and Astronomical Services Administration (PAGASA) strictly watched the movement of the typhoon for its possible landfall and hazards. Some coconut traders and farmers also monitored the typhoon's track as coconuts' prices and trades soared high, due to the devastating effects of Lola that struck the country, not a week later. Also that day, the PAGASA raised their highest public storm warning signal over Catanduanes, Albay, Sorsogon, Samar, Burias Island, Masbate, Biliran, Romblon, the whole island of Panay, northern portions of Leyte, Cebu, the island of Negros and Cuyo Island in Palawan due to the violent storm. 57 evacuation centers throughout the central Philippines accommodated 12,205 families as they prepare for the brunt of the storm.

== Impact ==
In Yap State, some residents experienced a wind speed of 38 knots from the storm, downing some banana trees and twigs, but there were no reports of affected buildings and structures. No deaths and injuries were reported and the total damages were minimal, though there were no exact amounts.

Numerous landslides and flash floods occurred and reported in the central Philippines, mainly in Samar and Camarines Sur. Combined reports from official and reliable sources at that time, the deaths from the typhoon were finalized at 245 individuals, missings at 66, and over 524 injured, which the majority are due to drowning and mudslides. 164,800 individuals were homeless and nearly a million were affected, in the other hand. 36,913 houses were completely destroyed, while 128,915 more were partially damaged. A vessel sunk in an unknown place, drowning nine individuals; however, they were included as missing. 15 persons died from swollen rivers in Mindoro Occidental and another 14 in Samar, which are mostly because they are pinned by fallen coconut trees. Thirty percent of the coconut plantations were destroyed and many farmlands were either washed out or flooded. The total amount of damages from the typhoon at the Philippines were estimated at $50 million (1993 USD).

Some rain showers began to impact Thailand on the night of December 15; however, no damages and deaths were reported, except for some low-lying floods.

== Aftermath ==
After Manny devastated the storm-weary Philippines, then-president Fidel V. Ramos declared a state of calamity on Sorsogon, Masbate, Romblon and Northern Samar due to the catastrophic effects of the typhoon. This means that relief help and operations were speeded in these areas to assist the evacuees that are affected.

On December 13, The Philippine National Red Cross and International Red Cross and Red Crescent Movement (IRCRCM) issued an appeal for assistance on the country, which amounts to $2.122 million (1993 USD) to provide evacuees food and non-food assistance, nutrition centres, distribution of seedlings for affected farmers and fishing nets for fishermen. Food supplies, blankets, clothing, and other essential supplies were also given to the evacuees by planes and helicopters due to the fact that some evacuation centers were blocked and/or impassable by land vehicles.

On December 14, while the typhoon is weakening over the South China Sea, the Eastern Samar experienced a magnitude 5.3 earthquake which killed a person and injured two more. This brought further devastation to the area, where subsequent buildings sustained damages.

These efforts were again halted as the last storm of the season, Tropical Storm Nell impacts Mindanao and Visayas, causing another round of floods and landslides before, during and after Christmas Day.

== See also ==
- Typhoon Kyle (1993)
- Typhoon Lola (1993)
- Typhoon Muifa (2004)
