= List of storms named Siony =

The name Siony has been used for three tropical cyclones in the Philippine Area of Responsibility by PAGASA in the Western Pacific Ocean.

- Typhoon Tokage (2004) (T0423, 27W, Siony) – struck Japan.
- Severe Tropical Storm Maysak (2008) (T0819, 24W, Quinta-Siony) – after PAGASA released the final advisory on "Quinta", PAGASA started to reissue advisories on Quinta, however Quinta was renamed as "Siony".
- Severe Tropical Storm Atsani (2020) (T2020, 23W, Siony) – affected Taiwan

Preceded by Romina	Pacific typhoon season names Siony	Succeeded by Tonyo
