= List of storms named Tonyo =

The name Tonyo has been used for three tropical cyclones in the Philippine Area of Responsibility by PAGASA in the Western Pacific Ocean.

- Typhoon Nock-ten (2004) (T0424, 28W, Tonyo) – struck Taiwan.
- Tropical Storm Noul (2008) (T0821, 26W, Tonyo) – struck Vietnam.
- Tropical Storm Etau (2020) (T2021, 24W, Tonyo) – struck the Philippines and Vietnam.

Preceded by Siony	Pacific typhoon season names Tonyo	Succeeded by Upang
