= Tropical Storm Maysak (2008) =

Pacific severe tropical storm in 2008

Severe Tropical Storm Maysak (Quinta–Siony)
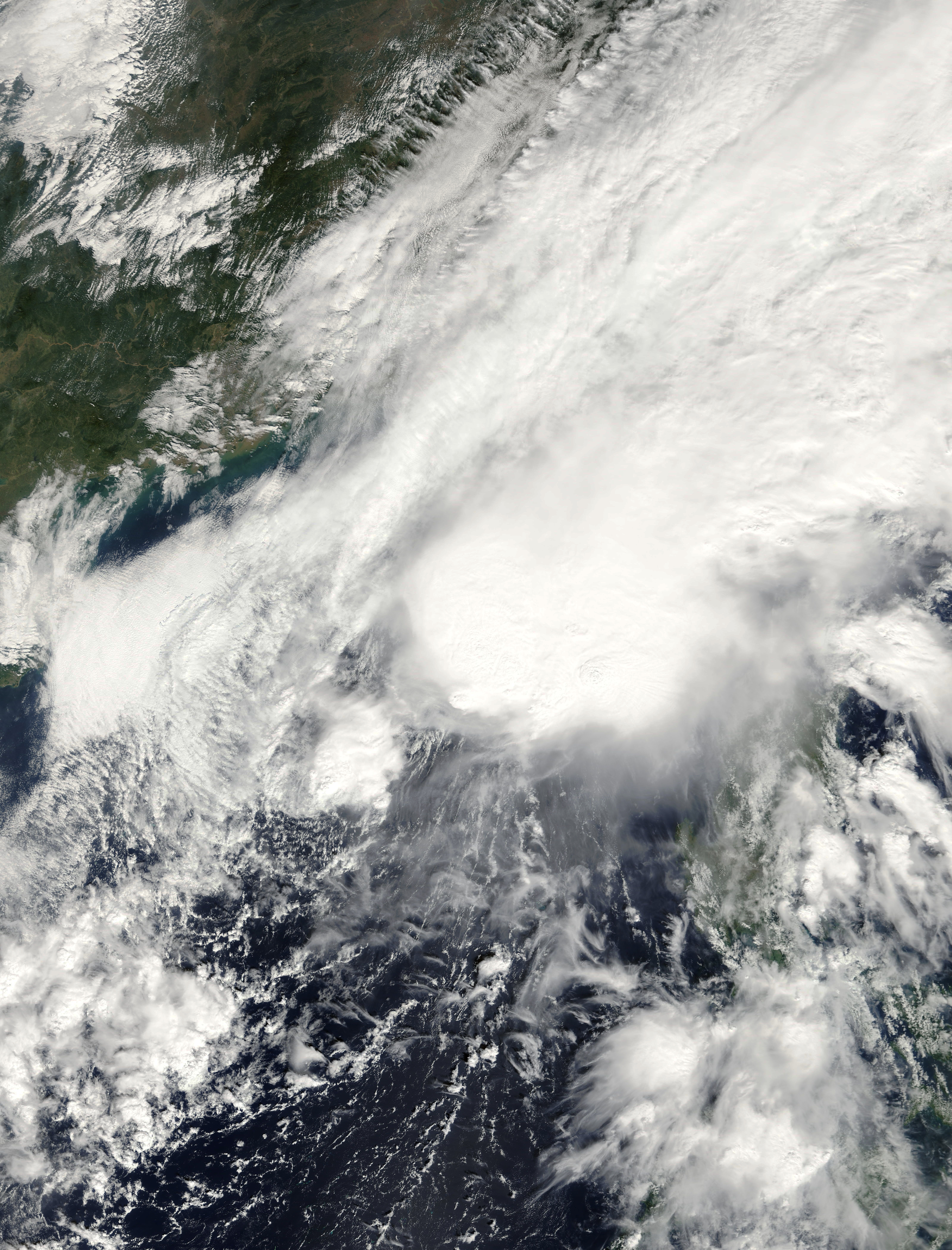
- Tropical Storm Maysak shortly after peak intensity on November 9

Meteorological history
- Formed: November 6, 2008
- Dissipated: November 14, 2008

Severe tropical storm
- 10-minute sustained (JMA)
- Highest winds: 95 km/h (60 mph)
- Lowest pressure: 985 hPa (mbar); 29.09 inHg

Tropical storm
- 1-minute sustained (SSHWS/JTWC)
- Highest winds: 100 km/h (65 mph)
- Lowest pressure: 982 hPa (mbar); 29.00 inHg

Overall effects
- Fatalities: 30 total
- Damage: Unknown
- Areas affected: Philippines
- IBTrACS
- Part of the 2008 Pacific typhoon season

Severe Tropical Storm Maysak, known in the Philippines as Tropical Storm Quinta and Tropical Depression Siony, was recognised as the 19th tropical storm by the Japan Meteorological Agency. It was also recognised as the 24th tropical depression and the 22nd tropical storm by the Joint Typhoon Warning Center of the 2008 Pacific typhoon season.

== Meteorological history ==
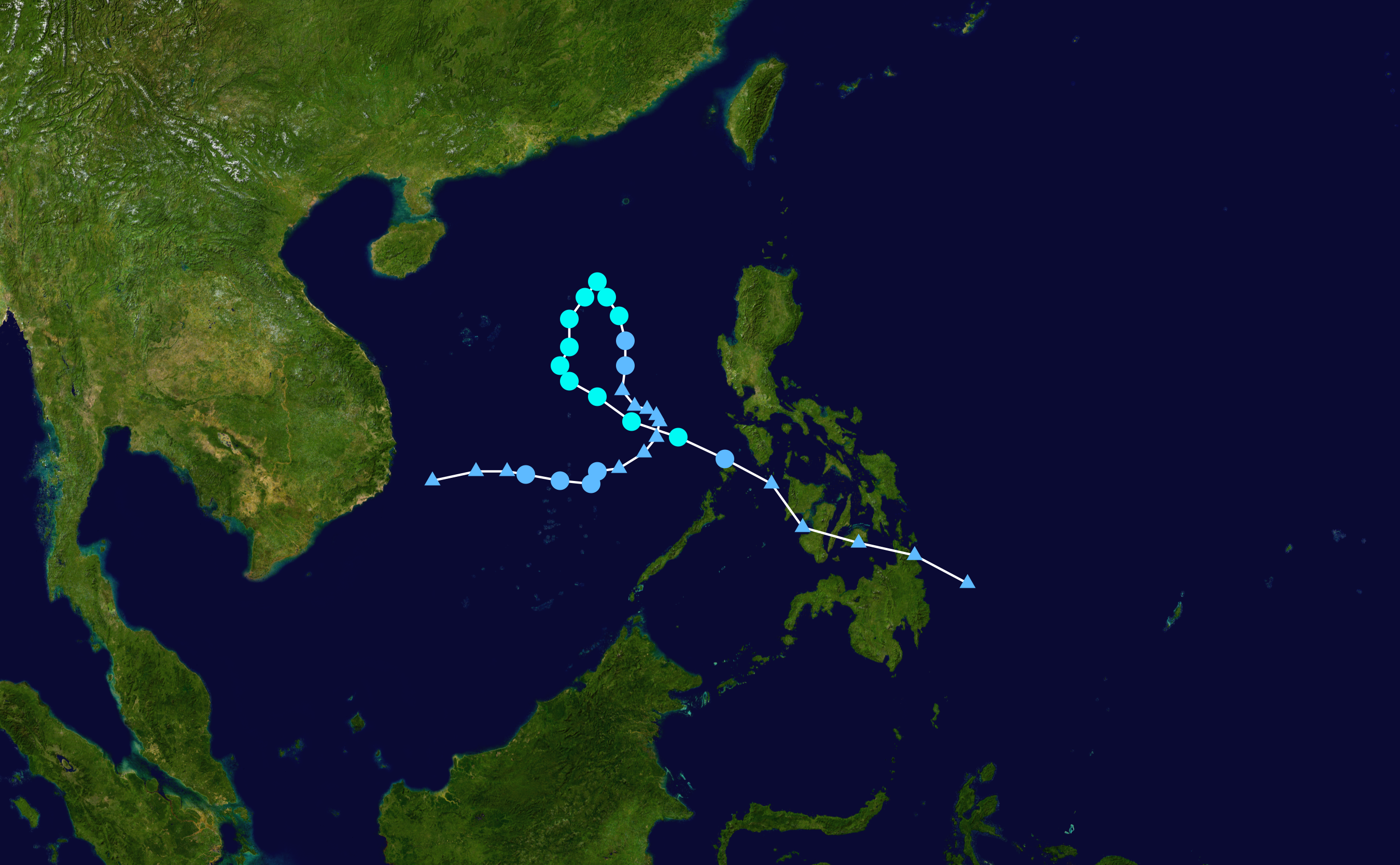
Map plotting the storm's track and intensity, according to the Saffir–Simpson scale Map key Saffir–Simpson scale Tropical depression (≤38 mph, ≤62 km/h) Tropical storm (39–73 mph, 63–118 km/h) Category 1 (74–95 mph, 119–153 km/h) Category 2 (96–110 mph, 154–177 km/h) Category 3 (111–129 mph, 178–208 km/h) Category 4 (130–156 mph, 209–251 km/h) Category 5 (≥157 mph, ≥252 km/h) Unknown Storm type Tropical cyclone Subtropical cyclone Extratropical cyclone, remnant low, tropical disturbance, or monsoon depression

On November 5, 2008, a tropical disturbance formed in the Philippine Sea to the northeast of Zamboanga in the Philippines. Later that day whilst the disturbance moved towards the north-west, the Joint Typhoon Warning Center assessed the disturbances chances of forming into a significant tropical cyclone within 24 hours as "Poor". Early the next day as the disturbance was moving closer to the Philippines, PAGASA designated the disturbance as Tropical Depression Quinta. Later that day the JTWC upgraded the disturbances chances of becoming a significant tropical cyclone to "Fair" and then to "Good" as they released a Tropical Cyclone Formation Alert on the developing disturbance. The Japan Meteorological Agency then designated the disturbance as a minor tropical depression, at the same time the JTWC designated the tropical depression as 24W.

On November 7 after the JMA had designated the minor tropical depression as a full tropical depression, the JTWC and the JMA upgraded the depression to a tropical storm with the JMA assigning the name Maysak. (Note: The name Maysak (Khmer: ម៉ៃសាក់, [maj.ˈsaʔ]) was contributed by Cambodia and means teak (Tectona grandis) in Khmer.) The next day PAGASA released their final advisory on tropical storm Quinta (Maysak) as it had moved out of PAGASA's area of responsibility, this came as both the JTWC and the JMA reported that Maysak had reached its peak wind speeds of 60 mph (95 km/h) 10-Min sustained & 70 mph (110 km/h) 1-Min sustained. This meant that the JMA considered Maysak to be a severe tropical storm at its peak whilst on the Saffir-Simpson Hurricane Scale Maysak was considered to be a tropical storm.

Later that day Maysak recurved and started moving towards the south towards PAGASA's area of responsibility. The next day before Maysak re-entered PAGASA's area of responsibility, the JMA reported that Maysak had weakened into a tropical storm and then into a tropical depression, and released their final full advisory on Maysak. However the JTWC were reporting at this time that Maysak was still a tropical storm. Maysak then moved back into PAGASA's area of responsibility later that day, at this time PAGASA thought that Maysak was still a tropical storm. The JTWC downgraded Maysak to a tropical depression and released their final advisory early on November 10. PAGASA also downgraded Maysak to a tropical depression at this time however they kept issuing warnings until early the next afternoon when they released their final advisory on Quinta.

On November 12, PAGASA started to reissue advisories on Quinta, and renamed the system Siony. The JMA were also still monitoring Siony as a minor tropical depression at this time, whilst the JTWC assessed Maysak's remnants chances of regenerating into a significant tropical cyclone as fair. Later that day the JTWC upgraded the remnants chances of regenerating as good and released a tropical cyclone formation alert. Later that day PAGASA released their final advisory on tropical depression Siony as it had moved out of their area of responsibility and was moving towards Vietnam in the west. Late the next day the JTWC cancelled the tropical cyclone formation alert as they had reassessed Maysak chances of forming into a significant tropical cyclone within 24 hours as poor. Early the next day the JMA released their final advisory on tropical depression Maysak whilst later that morning the JTWC declared that Maysak had dissipated.

== Preparations and Impact ==
=== Philippines ===
As PAGASA declared that Tropical Depression Quinta had formed, they put Public Storm warning signal No.1 up for parts of Luzon, Visayas, Mindanao. This meant that wind speeds of 30–60 km/h were expected within 36 hours. Later that day PAGASA put some more areas of Luzon under Signal 1 and cancelled the signal over parts of Mindanao Later on November 6 PAGASA kept revising the areas under Signal No.1 in Visayas & Luzon. PAGASA then cancelled all signals for Visayas Later that day as Quinta moved away from the Philippines. Early the next day PAGASA cancelled all off the signals for Luzon as they released their first final advisory on Quinta.

On November 12, the Philippine National Disaster Coordinating Council (NDCC) reported that over 4800 people were affected by tropical storm Maysak. The NDCC reported that a total of 92 homes were either partially or totally destroyed in the Philippines. Sixteen of the municipalities in the Philippines reported power interruptions from November 6 until November 7. In total 19 people were killed by Maysak and 14 people injured.

=== Vietnam ===
The remnants of Maysak lead to flooding rains in Vietnam which left at least 11 people dead. Flood waters in Ho Chi Minh City were estimated to be at least a metre (3 ft) deep.

== See also ==
- Other tropical cyclones named Maysak
- Other tropical cyclones named Quinta
- Other tropical cyclones named Siony
- Typhoon Xangsane (a.k.a. Milenyo in the Philippines) – passed over the Philippines in 2006, killing about 312 people.
- Typhoon Wutip (2013) (a.k.a. Paolo in the Philippines – a major typhoon that formed in the South China Sea.
- Tropical Storm Podul (2013) (a.k.a. Zoraida in the Philippines) – brought more misery to the Philippines after Typhoon Haiyan.
- Tropical Storm Kujira (2026) (a.k.a. Luis-Maymay in the Philippines) – the next tropical cyclone to have two local names by PAGASA.
