= Typhoon Kyle (1993) =

Western Pacific typhoon in 1993

Typhoon Kyle (Luring)
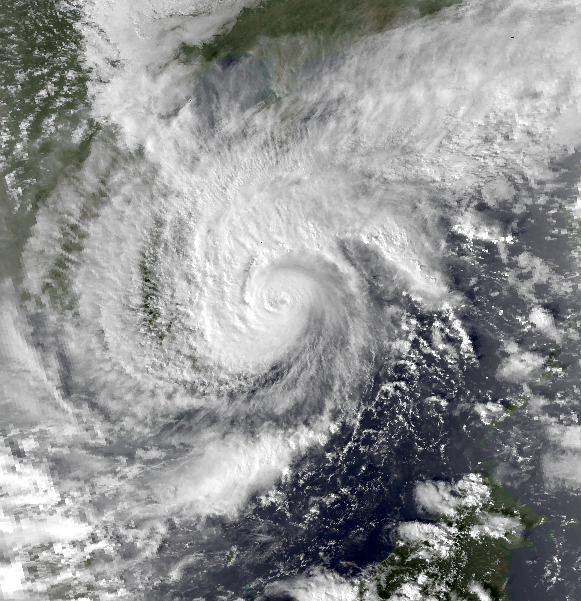
- Typhoon Kyle at peak intensity, nearing landfall at Vietnam on November 23

Meteorological history
- Formed: November 18, 1993
- Dissipated: November 23, 1993

Typhoon
- 10-minute sustained (JMA)
- Highest winds: 130 km/h (80 mph)
- Lowest pressure: 955 hPa (mbar); 28.20 inHg

Category 2-equivalent typhoon
- 1-minute sustained (SSHWS/JTWC)
- Highest winds: 175 km/h (110 mph)
- Lowest pressure: 960 hPa (mbar); 28.35 inHg

Overall effects
- Fatalities: 110 confirmed
- Missing: 59
- Damage: >$1.5 million (1993 USD)
- Areas affected: Caroline Islands; Palau; Yap; Philippines; Vietnam; Cambodia; Thailand
- Part of the 1993 Pacific typhoon season

Typhoon Kyle, locally named Luring, was the first of five deadly tropical cyclones that affected and impacted the Philippines and Vietnam during the 1993 Pacific typhoon season. The twenty-seventh named storm and thirteenth typhoon of the season, Kyle formed from a monsoon depression near Palau, associated with bursts of scattered convection. It then drifted west-northwest, strengthening to a tropical storm the next day. Land interaction prevented further intensification, and it crossed through the central Philippines while maintaining its intensity on November 20. Upon entering the South China Sea, the system strengthened to a severe tropical storm before rapidly intensifying to a typhoon, three days later. It soon reached its peak intensity that day, with one-minute maximum sustained winds of 175 km/h (110 mph), equivalent to a mid-level Category 2 typhoon. It held its strength until landfall in Vietnam later that evening. Weakening through the mountainous terrain of the country, it dissipated near the Cambodia–Thailand border on November 24.

The typhoon caused over 106 confirmed deaths, mainly are from Vietnam. Landslides and large swaths of flash floods are also seen and reported, as far as Thailand. The typhoon, overall, caused over $1.5 million (1993 USD) in total, mainly are from washed-out crops and farmlands in the country. The Philippines also reported some power outages, flooding and a fatality, but due to the sparse coverage from the typhoon, the total damages and overall deaths were unknown.

== Meteorological history ==
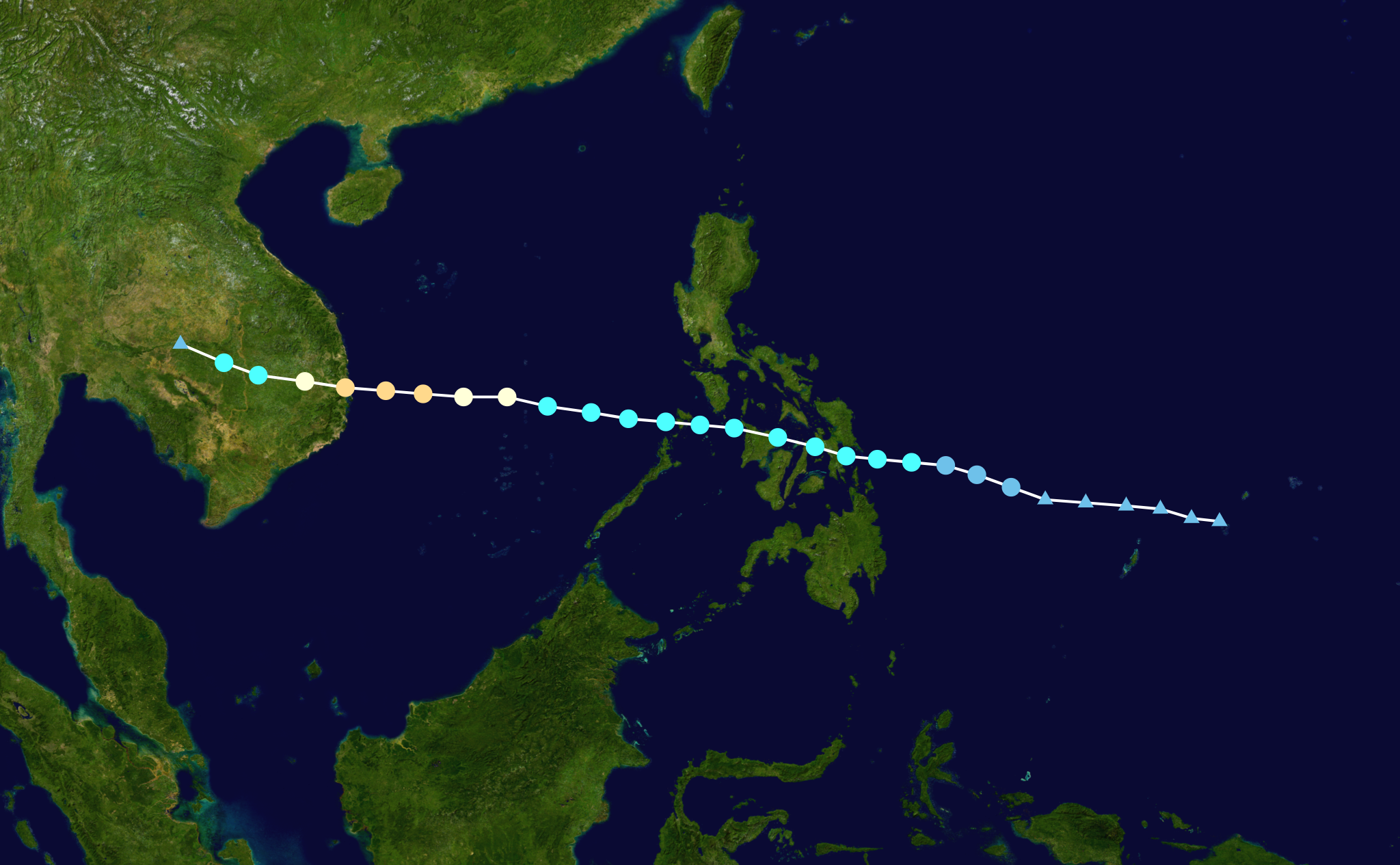
Map plotting the storm's track and intensity, according to the Saffir–Simpson scale Map key Saffir–Simpson scale Tropical depression (≤38 mph, ≤62 km/h) Tropical storm (39–73 mph, 63–118 km/h) Category 1 (74–95 mph, 119–153 km/h) Category 2 (96–110 mph, 154–177 km/h) Category 3 (111–129 mph, 178–208 km/h) Category 4 (130–156 mph, 209–251 km/h) Category 5 (≥157 mph, ≥252 km/h) Unknown Storm type Tropical cyclone Subtropical cyclone Extratropical cyclone, remnant low, tropical disturbance, or monsoon depression

At 12:00 UTC on November 17, the Joint Typhoon Warning Center started to monitor a monsoon depression associated with a weak area of convection near Yap State. The Japan Meteorological Agency (JMA) of Japan also started to mention the disturbance in their bulletins at that time. The disturbance had blossoming convection around its disorganized low-level circulation center at that time. It slowly moved to the west-northwest while slowly organizing, behind a favorable environment of low wind shear and warm sea surface temperatures. Around 06:00 UTC of November 19, the JTWC started to mention the developing system in their Significant Tropical Weather Advisories, as the disturbance became well-defined in satellite imagery. Roughly six hours later, the agency upgraded the system to a tropical depression without issuing a Tropical Cyclone Formation Alert due to the system quickly developing. At 18:00 UTC that day, the system attained a tight convective curvature, leading the JTWC to upgrade the system to a tropical storm and named it Kyle. The JMA also issued their first advisory on Kyle as a tropical storm at the same time. The system became slightly disorganized as it started to approach the Philippines due to wind shear, but still continued to organize despite the environment.

Early the next day, it passed to the south of Homonhon Island while traversing Leyte Gulf before making landfall on Abuyog, Leyte between 03:00 and 06:00 UTC as a minimal storm, with 65 km/h (40 mph) winds. It then traversed the province before moving through Ormoc Bay, just before another landfall between 09:00 and 10:00 UTC on Merida, Leyte. There, Kyle became highly disorganized while moving through the Visayas, although it remained a tropical storm. The storm then crossed the coast near Bagay before arriving again in the Visayan Sea. Landfall took place again on 18:00 UTC on Batad, Iloilo before crossing out on Sulu Sea, where it slightly strengthened. It then passed between Busuanga and Culion Island in Palawan on 09:00 UTC of the next day, before heading out to the South China Sea.

As Kyle moved again to a favorable environment, the system strengthened to a severe tropical storm before intensifying to a minimal typhoon, while located approximately 300 km, north-northwest of Nansha District. A small and elongated eye also emerged at this time. Early the next day, Kyle further strengthened to a mid-level typhoon and reached its peak intensity of 175 km/h (110 mph) and a minimum barometric pressure of 960 mbar, while approaching the coast of Vietnam on November 23. It held this intensity until it slightly weakened before its final landfall on the country, 380 km to the northeast of Ho Chi Minh City on the evening of the same day. A sustained wind speed of 40 m/s (144 km/h) was measured by a Vild anemometer (of Soviet origin and low accuracy) at a weather station in Tuy Hòa, Phú Yên province. The lowest barometric pressure recorded within the typhoon at this same station was 989.0 hPa (29.21 inHg). It rapidly weakened as it traversed Vietnam before entering the nearby Cambodia as a tropical depression. The last warning was issued by the JMA and JTWC as Kyle dissipated near the Cambodia-Thailand border on November 24.

== Preparations and impact ==
=== Philippines ===
Hundreds of individuals in Visayas were forced to flee due to Tropical Storm Kyle.

The storm, despite weak, spawned numerous flash floods and landslides that flooded homes in Leyte, Samar and Cebu. A fatality was reported in an unknown place when a 10-year old kid were electrocuted by a live wire. There were also reported crop and farmland damages to the central part of the country. In total, Kyle caused only minor damages, though the total damages and overall deaths were unknown due to sparse coverages.

=== Vietnam ===
The Central Committee for Flood and Storm Control (CCFSC) issued typhoon watches and warnings to the coastal portions of the country and some residents were evacuated to safe places.

Officials in Vietnam reported 106 deaths, 59 missing, and 476 injuries due to the typhoon. Torrential downpour and strong winds destroyed 5,601 houses and submerged over 11,217 more. Some schools also collapsed and bridges were washed out due to strong currents from overflowed rivers. Over 17,212 hectares of farmlands were also destroyed and hundreds of fishing boats sustained damages.

The total damages from Kyle in the country were estimated at $1.5 million (1993 USD).

=== Thailand ===
The remnants of the storm also caused floods in Thailand. Some authorities in Nakhon Si Thammarat reported three fatalities, all for unknown reasons.

== See also ==
- Typhoon Lola (1993) - a strong typhoon that brought further devastation to the Philippines and Vietnam
- Typhoon Manny - a violent typhoon that crossed the Philippine archipelago after looping, before weakening and sparing Vietnam
