= Typhoon Lola =

Pacific typhoon in 1993

Typhoon Lola (Monang)
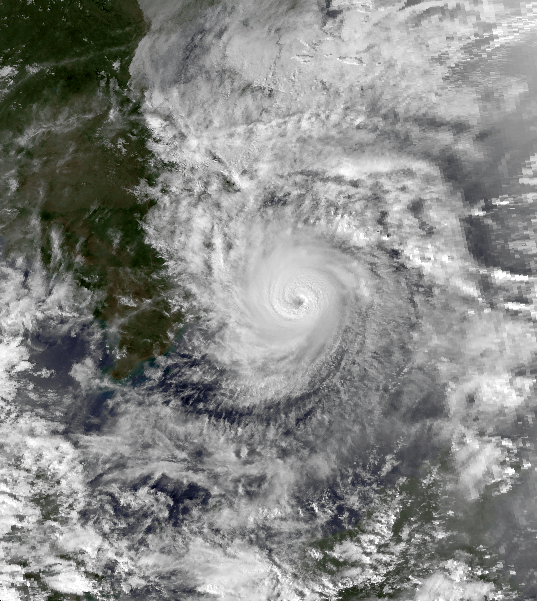
- Typhoon Lola approaching Vietnam on December 8

Meteorological history
- Formed: December 1, 1993
- Dissipated: December 9, 1993

Typhoon
- 10-minute sustained (JMA)
- Highest winds: 150 km/h (90 mph)
- Lowest pressure: 955 hPa (mbar); 28.20 inHg

Category 3-equivalent typhoon
- 1-minute sustained (SSHWS/JTWC)
- Highest winds: 195 km/h (120 mph)
- Lowest pressure: 938 hPa (mbar); 27.70 inHg

Overall effects
- Fatalities: 370
- Injuries: 657
- Missing: 175
- Damage: $261 million (1993 USD)
- Areas affected: Caroline Islands; Philippines; Vietnam; Cambodia; Thailand
- IBTrACS
- Part of the 1993 Pacific typhoon season

Typhoon Lola, known in the Philippines as Typhoon Monang, was a deadly typhoon that impacted the Philippines and Indochina. The 47th tropical depression, 26th named storm, and 14th typhoon of the 1993 Pacific typhoon season, the origins of Lola can be traced back to an active near-equatorial trough. The JTWC began monitoring an area of convection on November 27, and on December 1, it developed into a tropical depression. The JMA upgraded the depression to a tropical storm the next day, with the JTWC giving it the name Lola on December 3. 12 hours later, the JMA upgraded Lola to a severe tropical storm. On December 4 at 6:00 UTC, the JTWC upgraded Lola to a typhoon. Shortly after, Lola reached its initial peak intensity, with the JMA assessing that it had peaked with a minimum central pressure of 955 hPa; Lola made landfall near the municipality of Vinzons on December 5 at 12:00 UTC. After making landfall, Lola weakened to a tropical storm as it emerged over the South China Sea on December 6, before re-strengthening into a typhoon. After strengthening into a typhoon, Lola began to quickly intensify, reaching its peak intensity with 1-min winds of 195 km/h (120 mph) on December 8 at 12:00 UTC. Lola weakened slightly before making its final landfall near the city of Camh Ranh as a Category 2-equivalent storm. Lola quickly weakened over land, dissipating on December 9.

Lola caused 370 deaths in total, of which 273 were in the Philippines, and 96 were in Vietnam. In total, Lola caused $261.3 million in damages. Flooding from Lola in Marinduque and the subsequent dam collapse in Mogpog was part of the lead-up to the Marcopper mining disaster that happened nearly 3 years later.

== Meteorological history ==
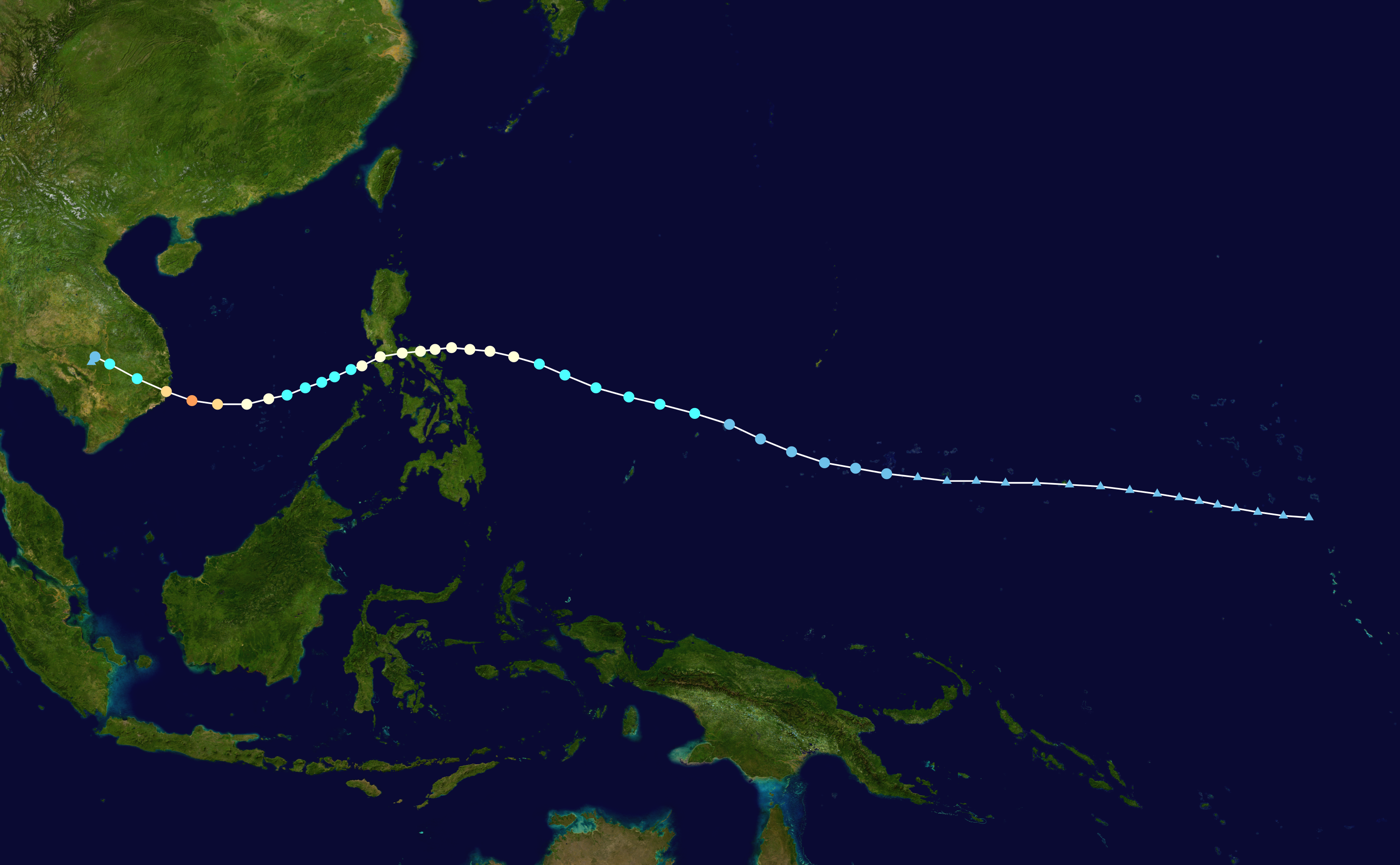
Map plotting the storm's track and intensity, according to the Saffir–Simpson scale Map key Saffir–Simpson scale Tropical depression (≤38 mph, ≤62 km/h) Tropical storm (39–73 mph, 63–118 km/h) Category 1 (74–95 mph, 119–153 km/h) Category 2 (96–110 mph, 154–177 km/h) Category 3 (111–129 mph, 178–208 km/h) Category 4 (130–156 mph, 209–251 km/h) Category 5 (≥157 mph, ≥252 km/h) Unknown Storm type Tropical cyclone Subtropical cyclone Extratropical cyclone, remnant low, tropical disturbance, or monsoon depression

The precursor to Lola formed from an active near-equatorial trough that produced 2 other typhoons. On November 27 at 6:00 UTC, the Joint Typhoon Warning Center (JTWC) began monitoring an area of convection situated near the western Marshall Islands. On December 1 at 4:00 UTC, the JTWC issued a Tropical Cyclone Formation Alert (TCFA) due to a consolidation of convection near the center. Hours later at 6:00 UTC, the Japan Meteorological Agency (JMA) began issuing advisories on a tropical depression about 950 km south-southeast of Guam. The same day at 19:00 UTC, the JTWC issued another TCFA as it moved out of the previous TCFA area. On December 2 at 0:00 UTC, the JTWC issued its first warning on Tropical Depression 35W due to increased convective organization. The same day at 18:00 UTC, the JMA upgraded the depression to a tropical storm, with the JTWC doing so later at 0:00 UTC on December 3, giving it the name Lola. At 12:00 UTC the same day, the JMA upgraded Lola to a severe tropical storm. Lola continued intensifying, and on December 4 at 6:00 UTC, the JTWC upgraded Lola to a typhoon due to the appearance of an eye. After intensifying into a typhoon, Lola turned westward, before reaching its initial peak intensity of 150 km/h (95 mph) on December 5 at 6:00 UTC according to the JTWC, with the JMA assessing that it had peaked in intensity at the same time, with a minimum central pressure of 955 hPa. Approximately 6 hours later, Lola made landfall near the municipality of Vinzons. Lola took a west-southwestward track as it passed over the Philippines and south of Manila, weakening into a severe tropical storm in the process. Lola re-emerged over the South China Sea on December 6. On December 8 at 0:00 UTC, both the JMA and the JTWC upgraded Lola to a typhoon for a second time due to a satellite intensity estimate. As Lola began turning west-northwestward, Lola began to quickly intensify, reaching Category 2 status 6 hours later. On the same day at 12:00 UTC, the JTWC assessed that it had peaked in intensity, with 1-min winds of 195 km/h (120 mph). 6 hours later, Lola made its final landfall near the city of Cam Ranh as a high-end Category 2-equivalent storm. The lowest sea level pressure recorded in Nha Trang (Khánh Hoà) during the typhoon was 999.4 hPa (29.51 inHg). Lola rapidly weakened over land, before both the JMA and the JTWC issued their final warnings on the system at 6:00 UTC on December 9. Lola dissipated over Cambodia later that day.

== Impacts ==
=== Philippines ===
At around 3:00 in the morning on December 6, the Marcopper siltation dam in the Mogpog river burst, sending a flood down the river and sweeping away 2 children in the town of Mogpog, with many farms and other property being destroyed by the deluge of mine tailings and toxic effluent. The Mogpog river was rendered biologically dead as a result.

On December 5, Lola caused a major flood in Naga City, with water up to 2 meters deep inundating areas around the Bicol River. In the coastal village of Sabang, swells from Lola engulfed houses near the shore and killed many residents. On December 6, President Fidel V. Ramos declared a state of calamity in the Bicol Region and in the provinces of Oriental Mindoro and Occidental Mindoro a day later. Ramos also ordered the release of 600 million pesos as assistance to the affected areas. A military cargo plane crashed while delivering supplies to areas affected by Lola due to bad weather caused by a nearby tropical depression. Power lines were cut throughout the country and air and sea travel were suspended due to strong winds, with stock exchanges, government offices, and classes being temporarily closed down. The area around Mount Pinatubo was avalanche-prone due to the 1991 eruption of Mount Pinatubo, but a change in course of Lola spared it from heavy rainfall. In Tayabas, sustained winds of 125 km/h (80 mph) were reported, with the Catanduanes radar station reporting sustained winds of 95 km/h (60 mph) and a minimum pressure of 981 hPa. Over 30 thousand houses were damaged, with another 242 thousand people having to flee their homes, with 583 thousand people being left homeless. 6 people were killed in Marinduque due to the collapse of a river dyke. In total, 273 were killed as a result of Lola, with 607 people injured, and 90 people missing; A majority of the casualties were caused by flooding and landslides. Lola also caused $94 million in damage.

=== Vietnam ===
The Central Committee For Flood and Storm Control issued typhoon warnings to provincial committees.

In Vietnam, more than 9 thousand houses were ruined and 500 fishing boats being damaged or lost, with 16,500 hectares of corn, cassava, and tobacco being destroyed. Another 27,500 hectares of land were flooded, of which 11 thousand were for rice. Relief efforts were reported to be underway after the storm hit on December 11. In total, 96 people were killed, with 50 people injured, and 85 people missing. $166 million in damage was also caused by Lola.

=== Elsewhere ===
In Thailand, flooding from Lola caused $1.3 million in damage.

== See also ==
- Tropical cyclones in 1993
- Marcopper mining disaster
- Tropical Storm Trami (2024)
