= 1967 Pacific typhoon season =

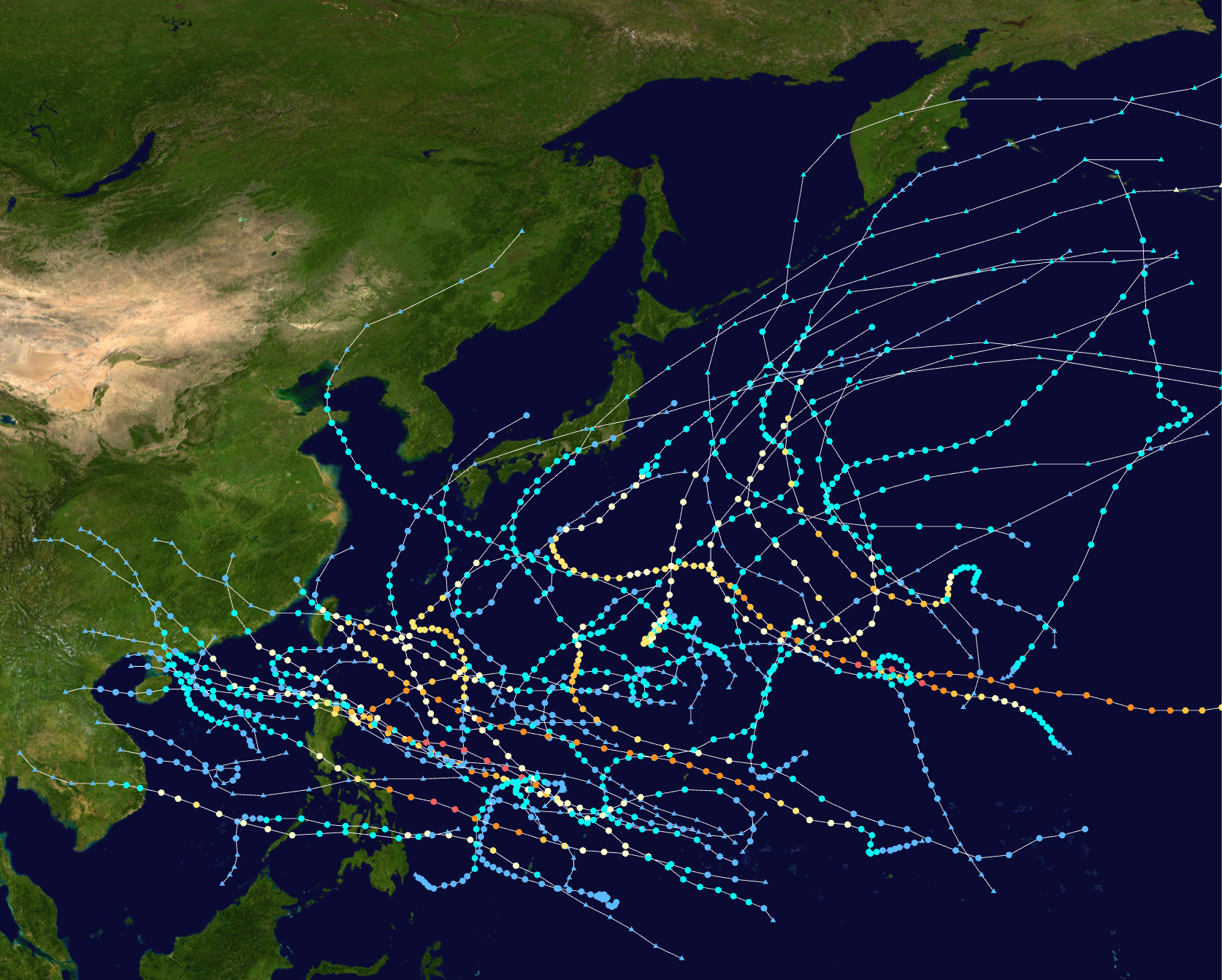
- Season summary map

Seasonal boundaries
- First system formed: January 28, 1967
- Last system dissipated: December 21, 1967

Strongest storm
- Name: Carla
  - Maximum winds: 295 km/h (185 mph) (1-minute sustained)
  - Lowest pressure: 900 hPa (mbar)

Seasonal statistics
- Total depressions: 40
- Total storms: 35
- Typhoons: 20
- Very strong typhoons: 5 (unofficial)
- Total fatalities: 934
- Total damage: Unknown

Related articles
- 1967 Atlantic hurricane season; 1967 Pacific hurricane season; 1967 North Indian Ocean cyclone season

The 1967 Pacific typhoon season was one of the most active Pacific typhoon seasons on record, witnessing the formation of 35 tropical storms during the season. It began on January 1, 1967, though most storms usually form between June and December within the basin. The first storm of the season, Ruby, formed on January 28 west of the Philippines. The scope of this article is limited to the Pacific Ocean, north of the equator and west of the International Date Line. Storms that form east of the date line and north of the equator are called hurricanes; see 1967 Pacific hurricane season. Tropical depressions that are monitored by the United States' Joint Typhoon Warning Center (JTWC) were given a numerical designation with a "W" suffix, and any storms reaching 1-minute sustained winds of over 40 mph were given a name. Tropical depressions that enter or form in the Philippine area of responsibility are assigned a name by the Philippine Weather Bureau, the predecessor of the Philippine Atmospheric, Geophysical and Astronomical Services Administration (PAGASA). This can often result in the same storm having two names.

In 1967, the number of storms that the Japan Meteorological Agency considered "typhoons" was the record number (39). However, the JTWC only considers 35 storms to have formed during the season, beginning with Ruby in January. Out of those 35 storms, 20 intensified to category 1-equivalent typhoons, 5 of those further strengthening to super typhoons.

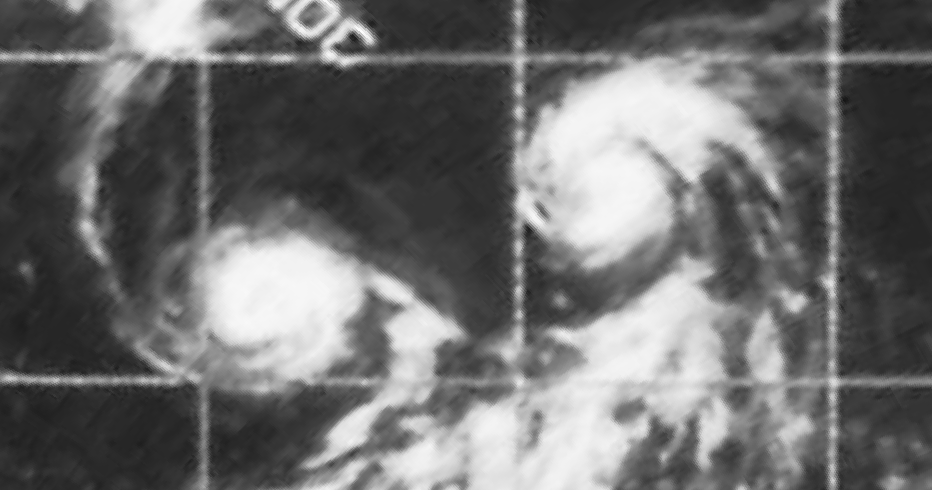
Typhoons Sarah and Wanda interacting in the Northwest Pacific Ocean on September 20th, 1967.

== Systems ==
During the 1967 Pacific typhoon season, 40 tropical depressions formed, of which 35 became tropical storms. Twenty tropical storms attained typhoon intensity, and five of the typhoons reached super typhoon intensity.

=== Tropical Storm Ruby (Auring) ===
- Tropical storm (JMA)
- Tropical storm (SSHWS)
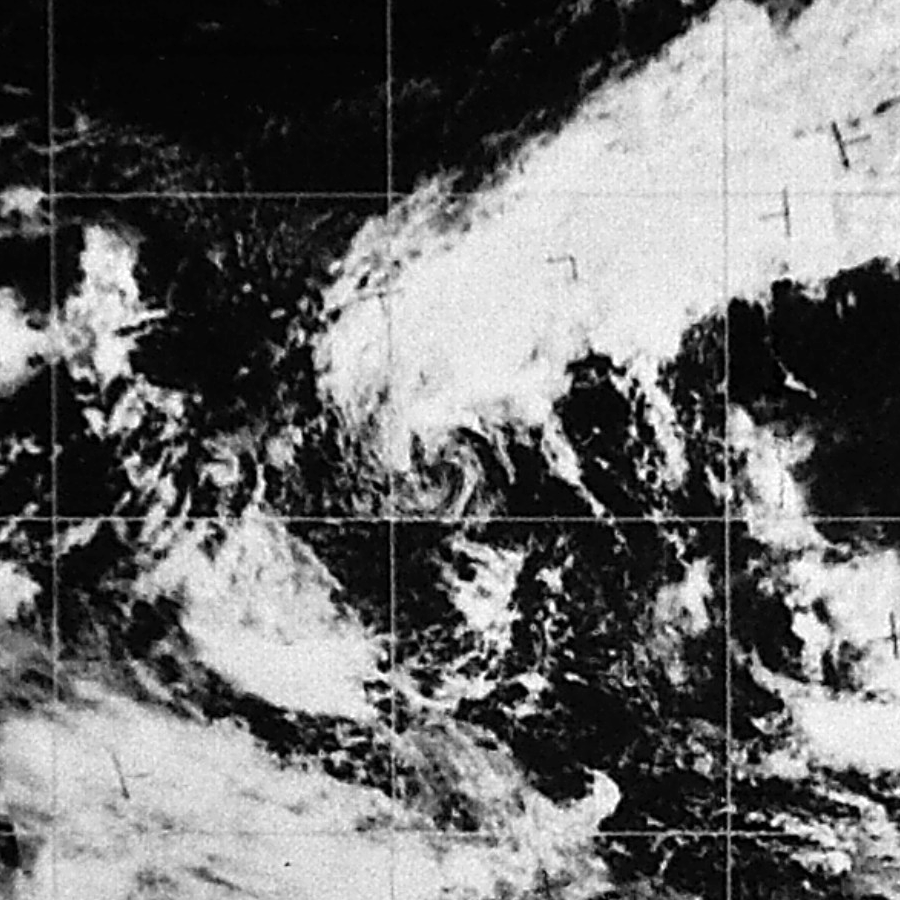
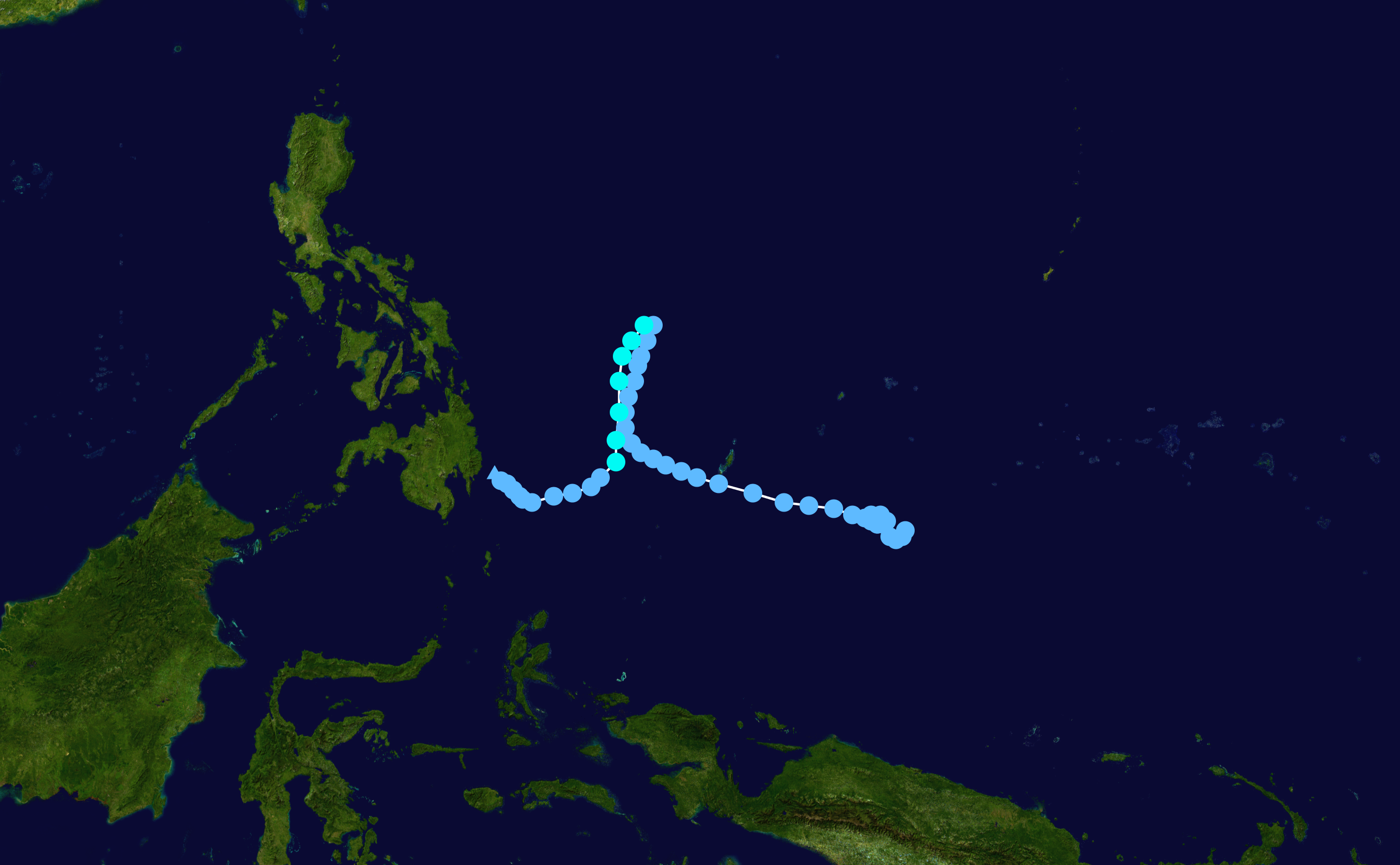
- Duration: January 28 – February 6
- Peak intensity: 75 km/h (45 mph) (1-min); 996 hPa (mbar)

Tropical Depression 01W formed on January 28, well to the south of Sorol Atoll in the Caroline Islands. It was later named Auring by the Philippine Weather Bureau, but it did not strengthen to a tropical storm until February 5, being named Ruby by the JTWC. Ruby dissipated four days later on February 9, southeast of the Davao region of the Philippines.

=== Typhoon Sally (Bebeng) ===
- Typhoon (JMA)
- Category 2 typhoon (SSHWS)
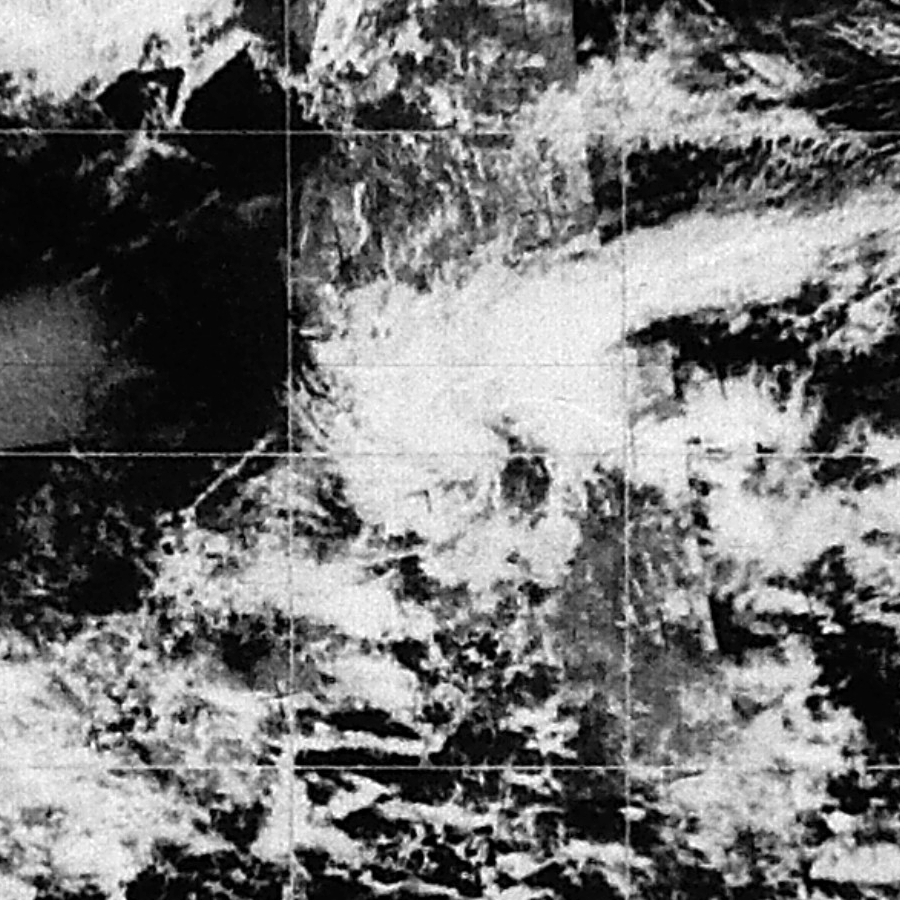
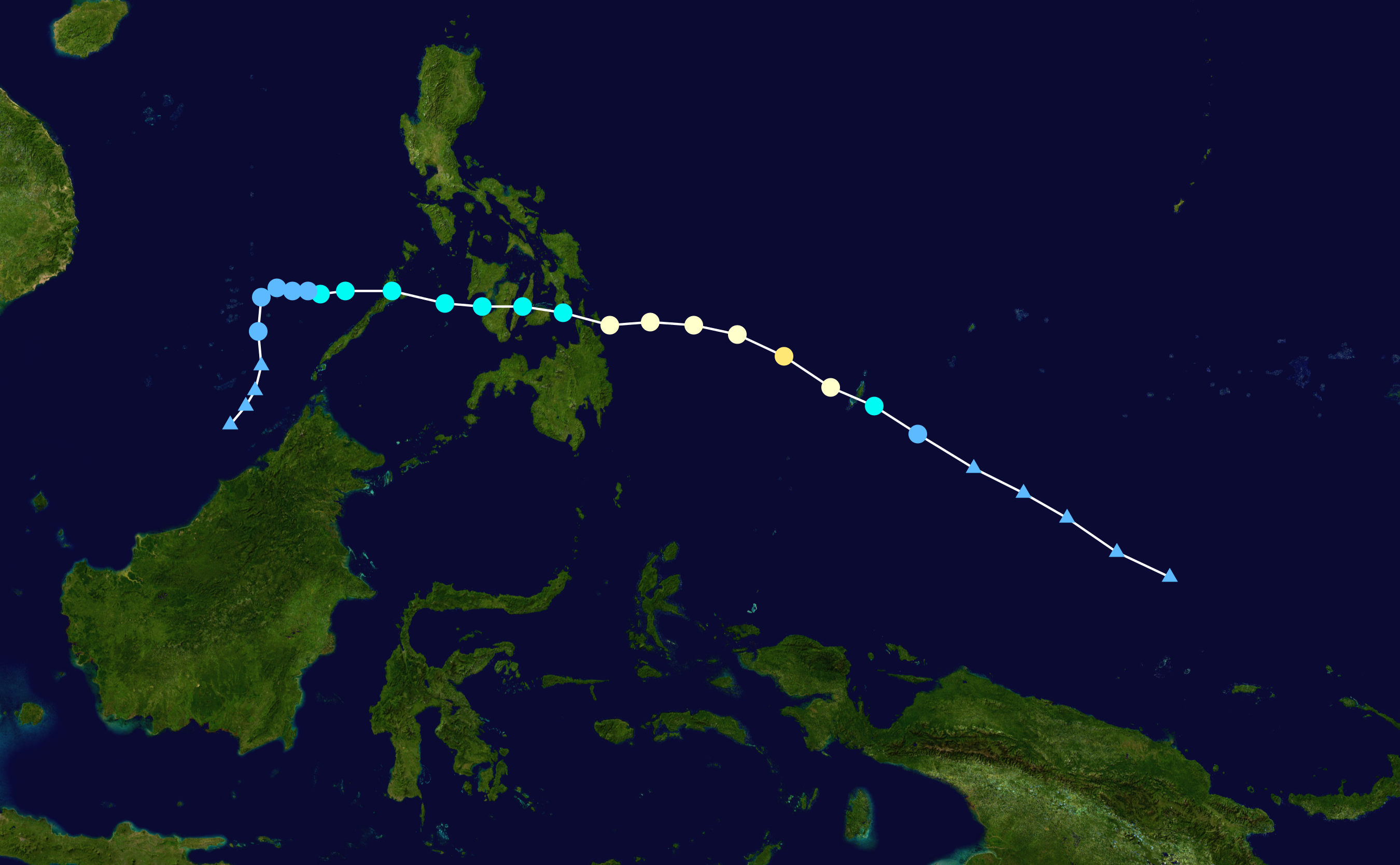
- Duration: February 28 – March 7
- Peak intensity: 155 km/h (100 mph) (1-min); 980 hPa (mbar)

Sally originated from an area of low pressure that formed northeast of Manus Island in Papua New Guinea.

=== Tropical Storm Therese ===
- Severe tropical storm (JMA)
- Tropical storm (SSHWS)
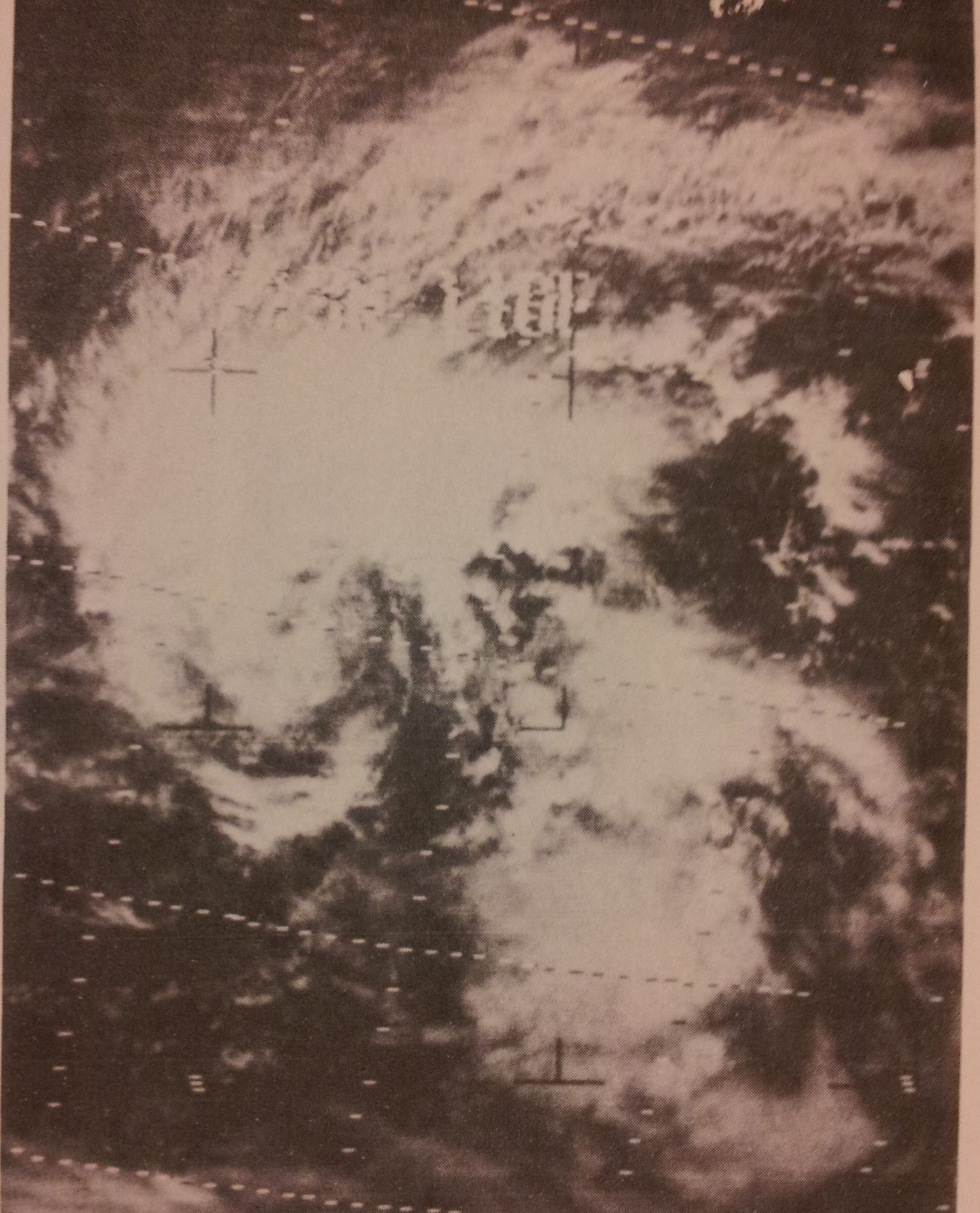
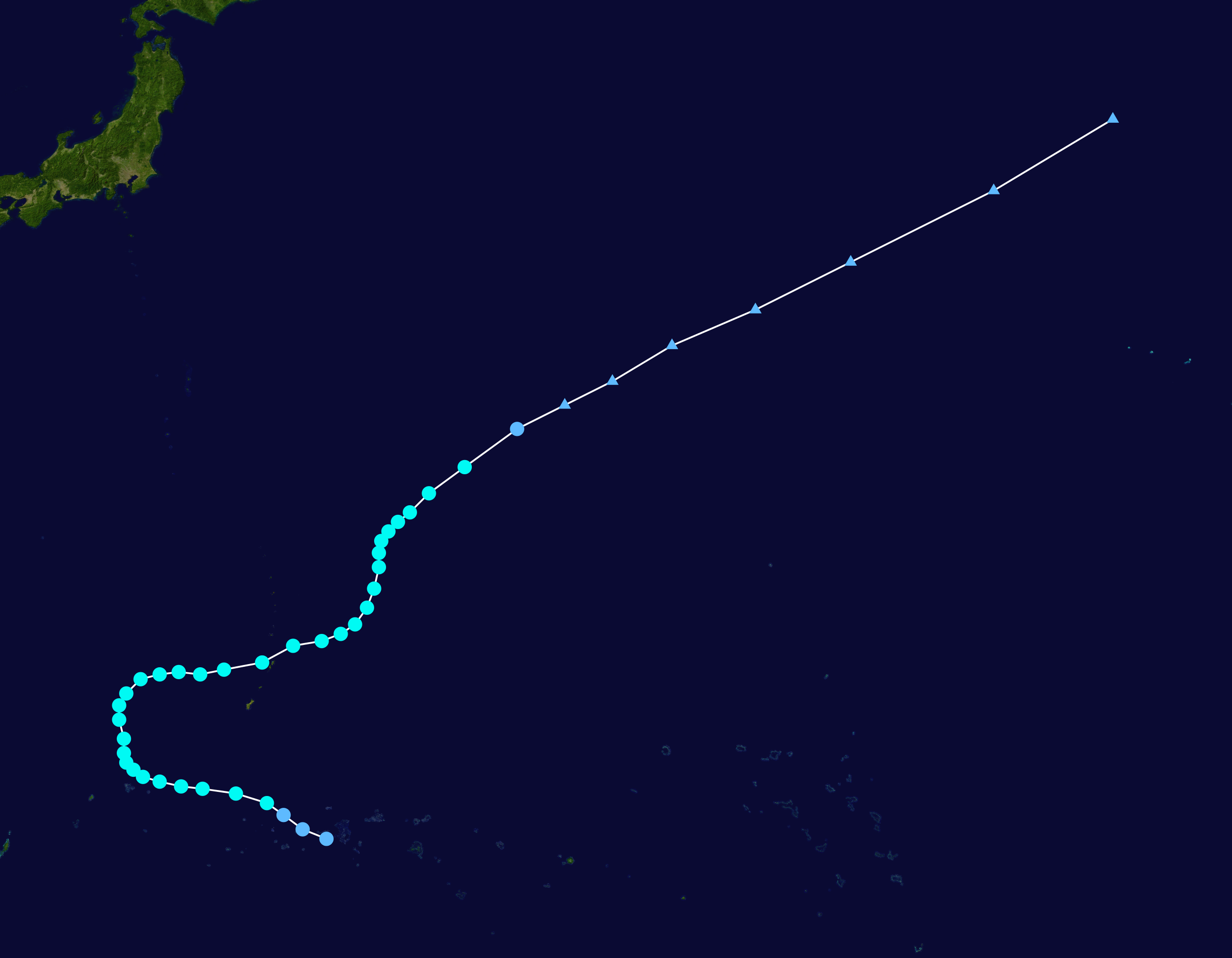
- Duration: March 15 – March 24
- Peak intensity: 110 km/h (70 mph) (1-min); 990 hPa (mbar)

Therese emerged in the western Pacific on March 15 near the Caroline Islands as a tropical depression. Within 24 hours, it intensified into a tropical storm, moving steadily west-northwestward through the Philippine Sea. By March 18, Therese reached its peak intensity with sustained winds of 110 km/h (70 mph) and a central pressure of 990 hPa, classifying it as a "severe tropical storm" per the Japan Meteorological Agency (JMA).

The storm's path took an unusual turn on March 19–20. After tracking westward for several days, Therese executed a small counterclockwise loop near 13.9°N, 139.6°E, likely influenced by shifting steering currents. This loop marked the start of its weakening phase. By March 21, Therese curved northeastward, with winds dropping to 40–50 km/h.

Therese maintained a northeast trajectory until March 24, passing well south of the Mariana Islands. It never made landfall, remaining over open ocean throughout its 10-day lifespan. The storm dissipated on March 26.

=== Typhoon Violet (Karing) ===
- Typhoon (JMA)
- Category 4 typhoon (SSHWS)
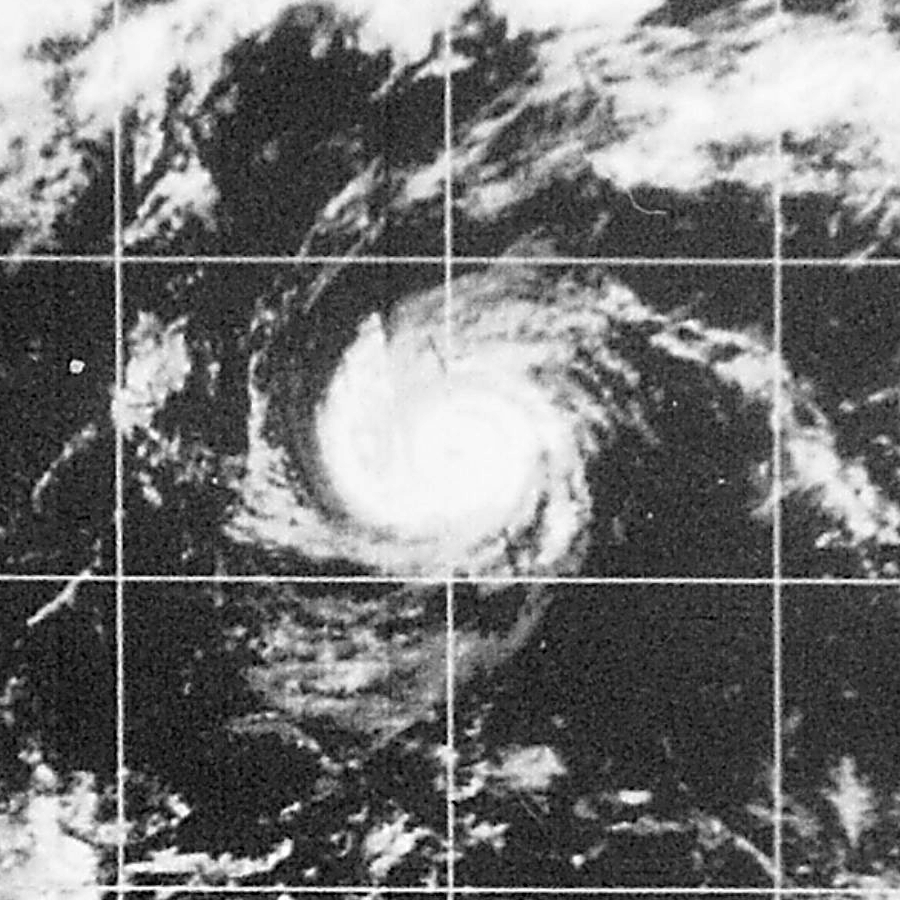
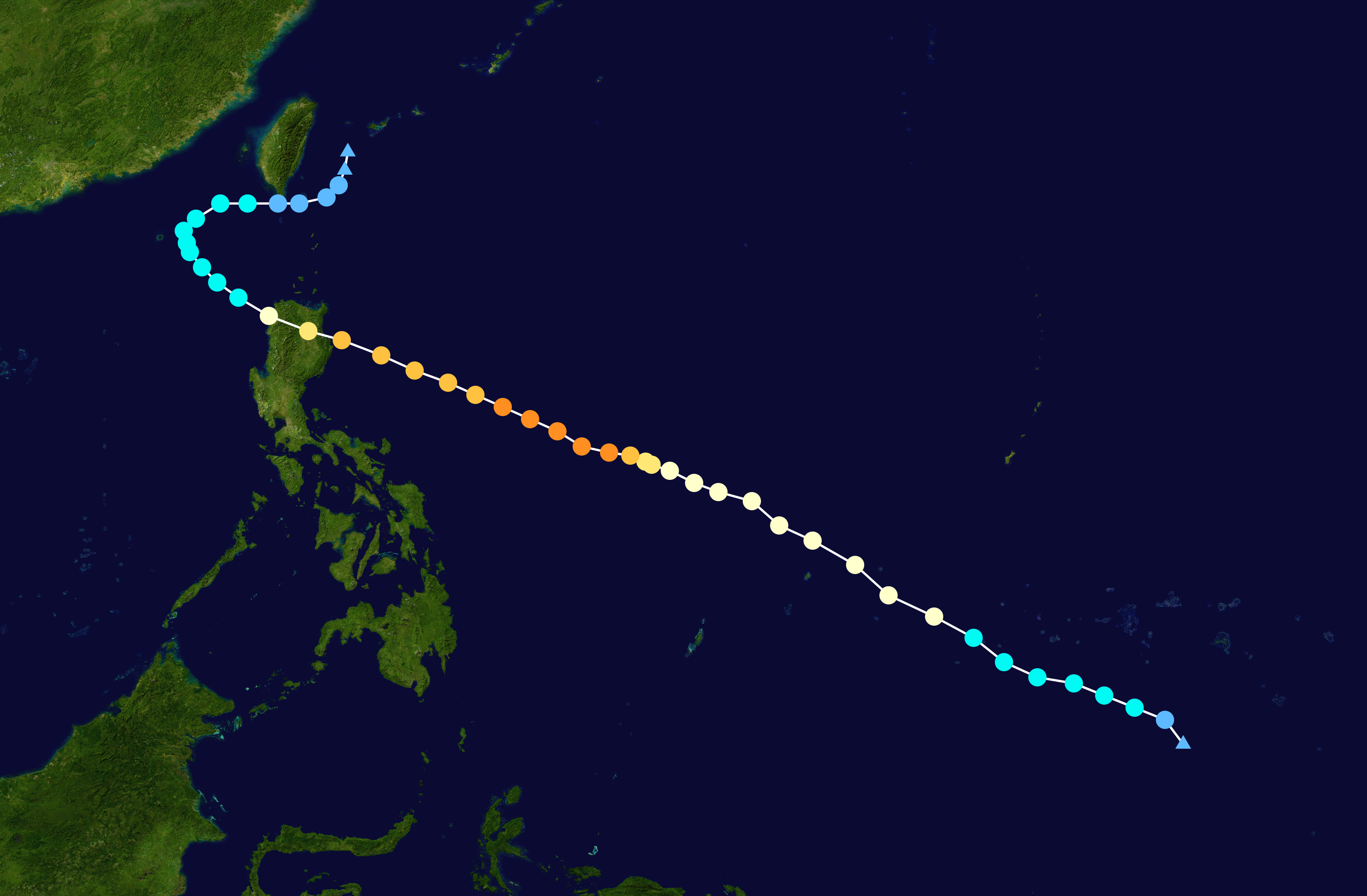
- Duration: March 31 – April 12
- Peak intensity: 220 km/h (140 mph) (1-min); 930 hPa (mbar)

Typhoon Violet, which formed on April 1, steadily weakened from its peak of 140 mph to directly impact northeastern Luzon as a 115 mph typhoon on the 8th. It dissipated in the South China Sea on April 12 without causing any significant damage.

=== Tropical Storm Wilda (Diding) ===
- Tropical storm (JMA)
- Tropical storm (SSHWS)
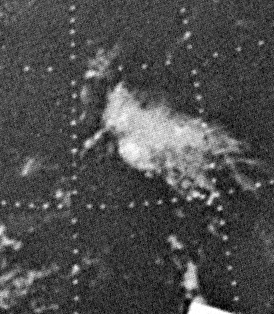
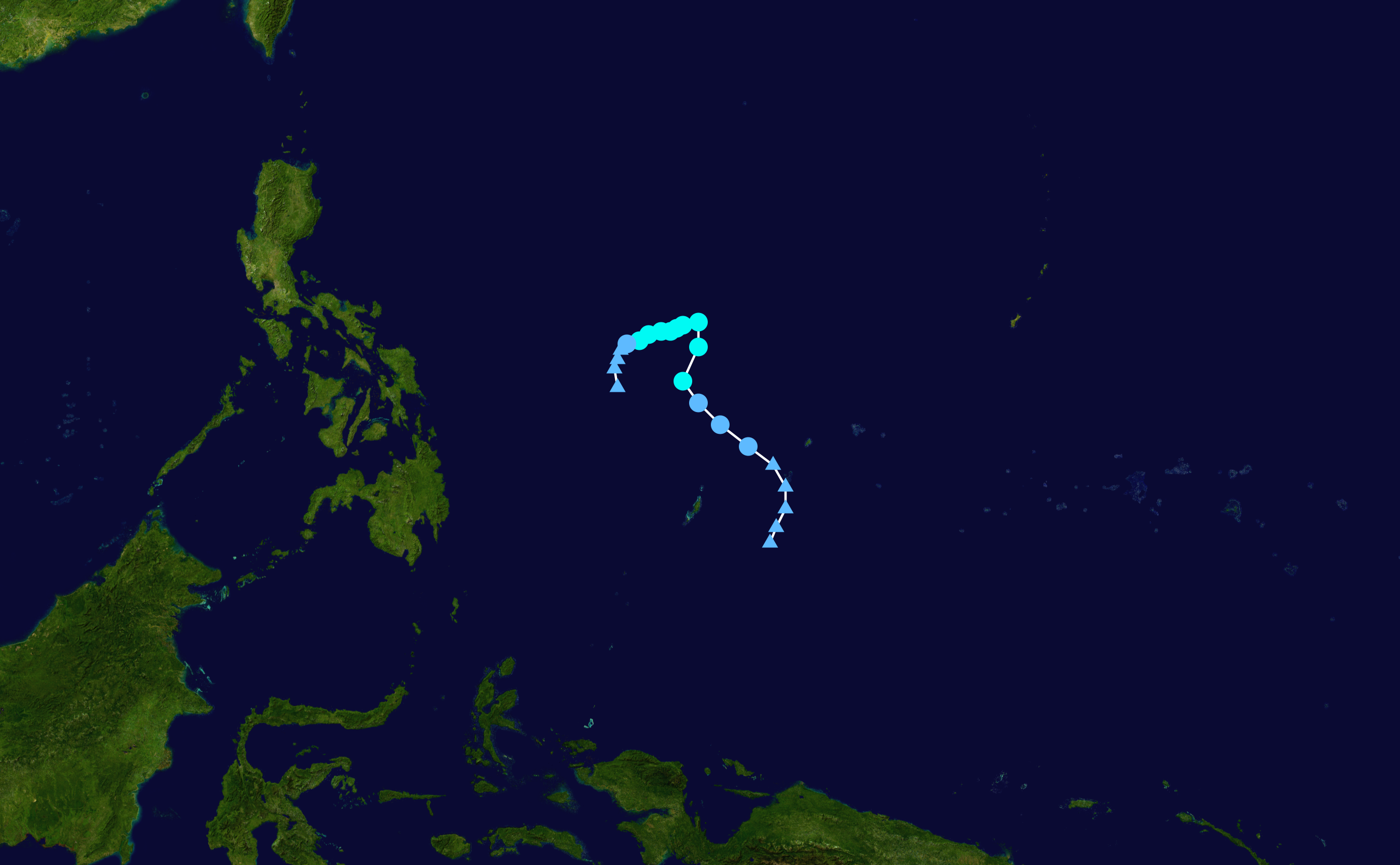
- Duration: May 8 – May 13
- Peak intensity: 75 km/h (45 mph) (1-min); 1004 hPa (mbar)

On May 8, a low-pressure area was noted by JMA near 6.3°N, 136.9°E in the western Pacific. Initially classified as a tropical disturbance, it drifted west-northwestward over the next two days, intensifying into a tropical depression by May 9 and reaching tropical storm status by May 10. Wilda's peak intensity was short-lived, with a minimum central pressure of 1004 hPa and sustained winds of 45 mph (75 km/h). The storm maintained tropical storm strength for approximately 54 hours, tracking steadily toward the Philippine Sea. By May 11–12, it weakened to a tropical depression just east of the Philippines. Wilda dissipated on May 13.

Wilda was notable for its compact lifespan (May 8–13) and limited impact, remaining over open ocean throughout its existence.

=== Typhoon Anita (Gening) ===
- Typhoon (JMA)
- Category 1 typhoon (SSHWS)
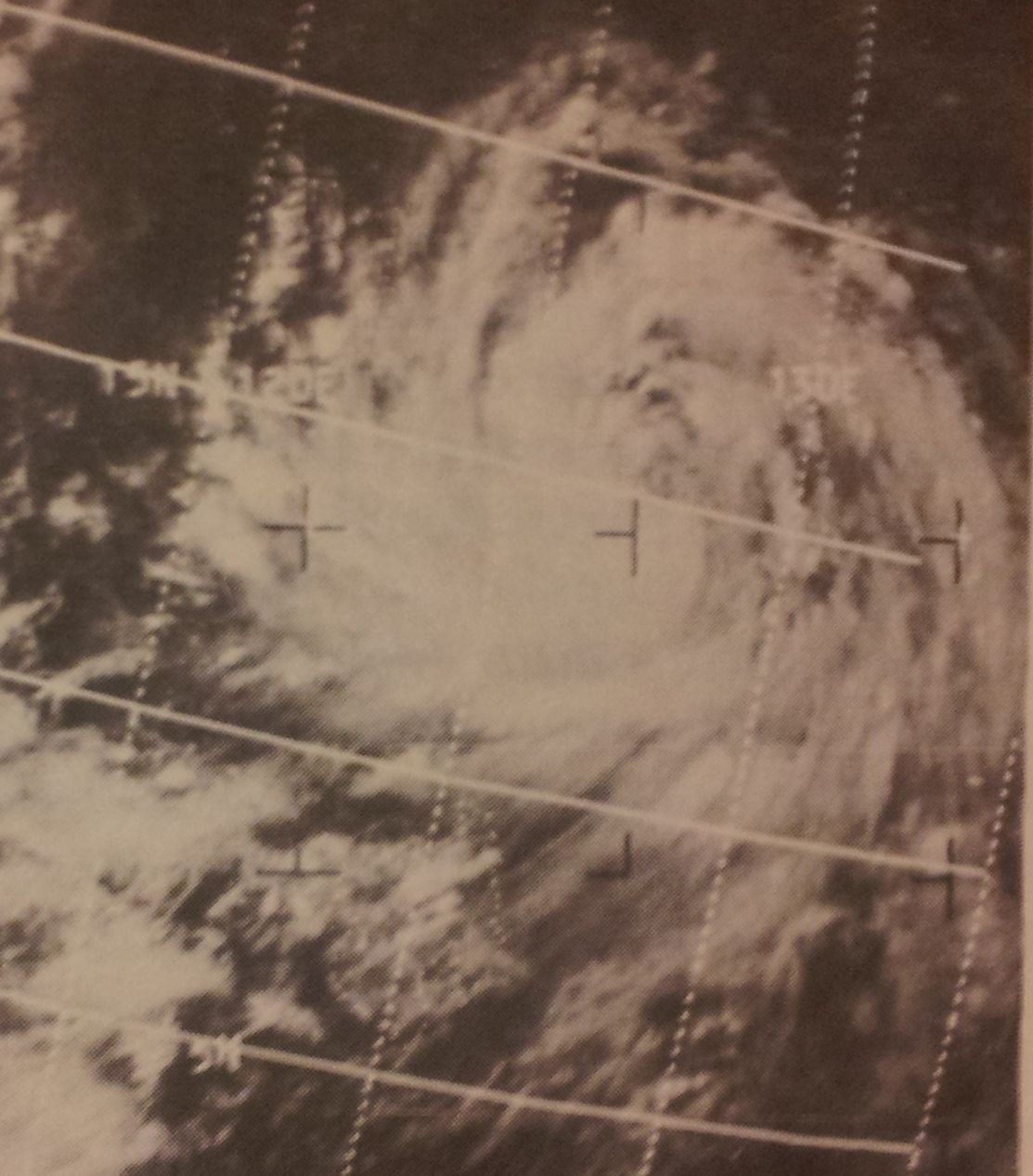
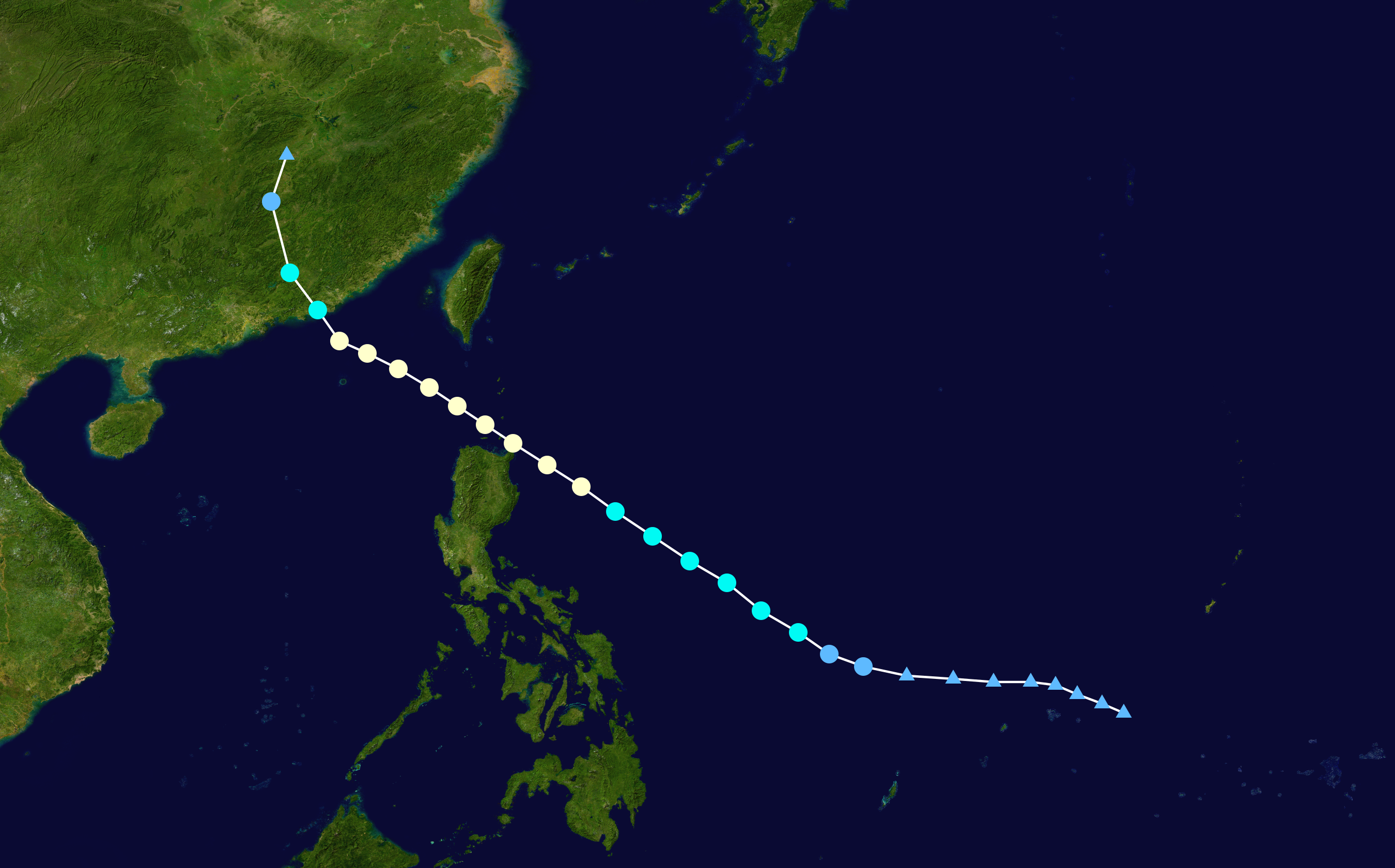
- Duration: June 24 – July 1
- Peak intensity: 150 km/h (90 mph) (1-min); 975 hPa (mbar)

Typhoon Anita originated as a low-pressure area near 10.0°N, 142.0°E in the western Pacific on June 24. Initially moving west-northwest, it intensified into a tropical depression by June 26 and achieved tropical storm status later that day near the Philippine Sea. Anita rapidly intensified, reaching typhoon strength (Category 1) by June 28. It achieved its peak intensity on June 29 with 75-knot winds (87 mph) and a central pressure of 975 hPa near 20.5°N, 119.6°E—approximately 300 km southeast of Hong Kong. The storm maintained this strength while tracking northwest toward the southern Chinese coast.On June 30 at 06:00 UTC, Anita made landfall near Guangdong, China, as a weakening tropical storm. It rapidly deteriorated over land, downgrading to a tropical depression within 12 hours. By July 1, Anita dissipated in Jiangxi Province.

Anita caused a plane crash in Hong Kong.

=== Typhoon Billie (Herming) ===
- Typhoon (JMA)
- Category 1 typhoon (SSHWS)
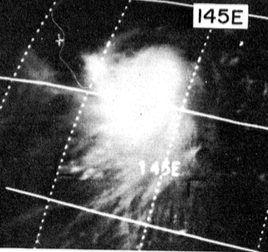
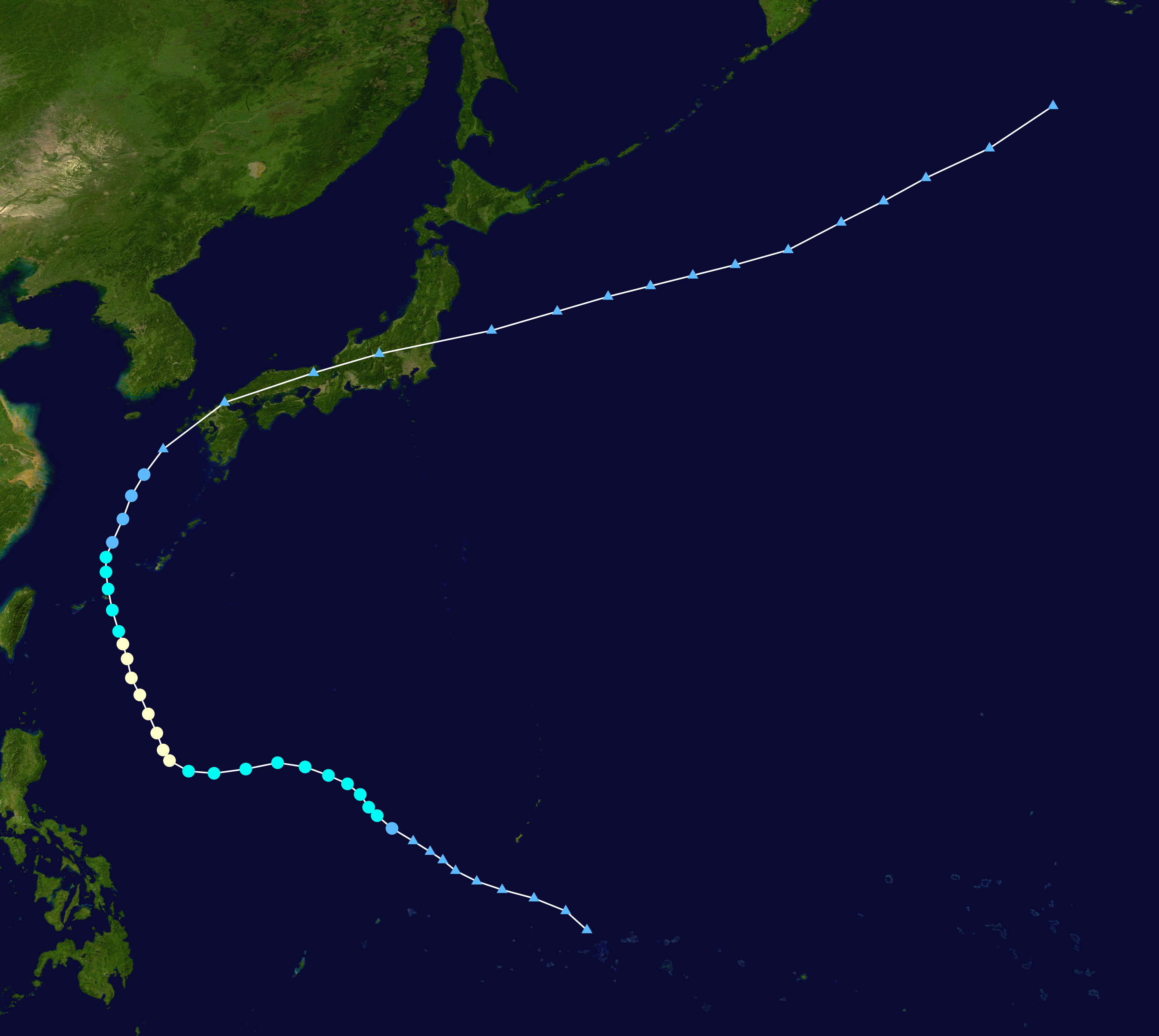
- Duration: June 29 – July 8
- Peak intensity: 140 km/h (85 mph) (1-min); 980 hPa (mbar)

Typhoon Billie, having developed on July 2, reached its peak of 85 mph on July 5. Billie's intensity fluctuated as it headed northward to Japan, and it became extratropical on the 8th; however, Billie's extratropical remnant continued northeastward, and it brought heavy rain to Honshū and Kyūshū, killing 347 people.

=== Typhoon Clara (Ising) ===
- Typhoon (JMA)
- Category 3 typhoon (SSHWS)
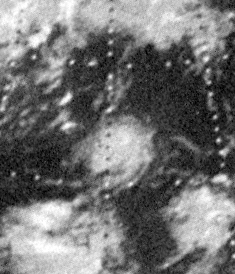
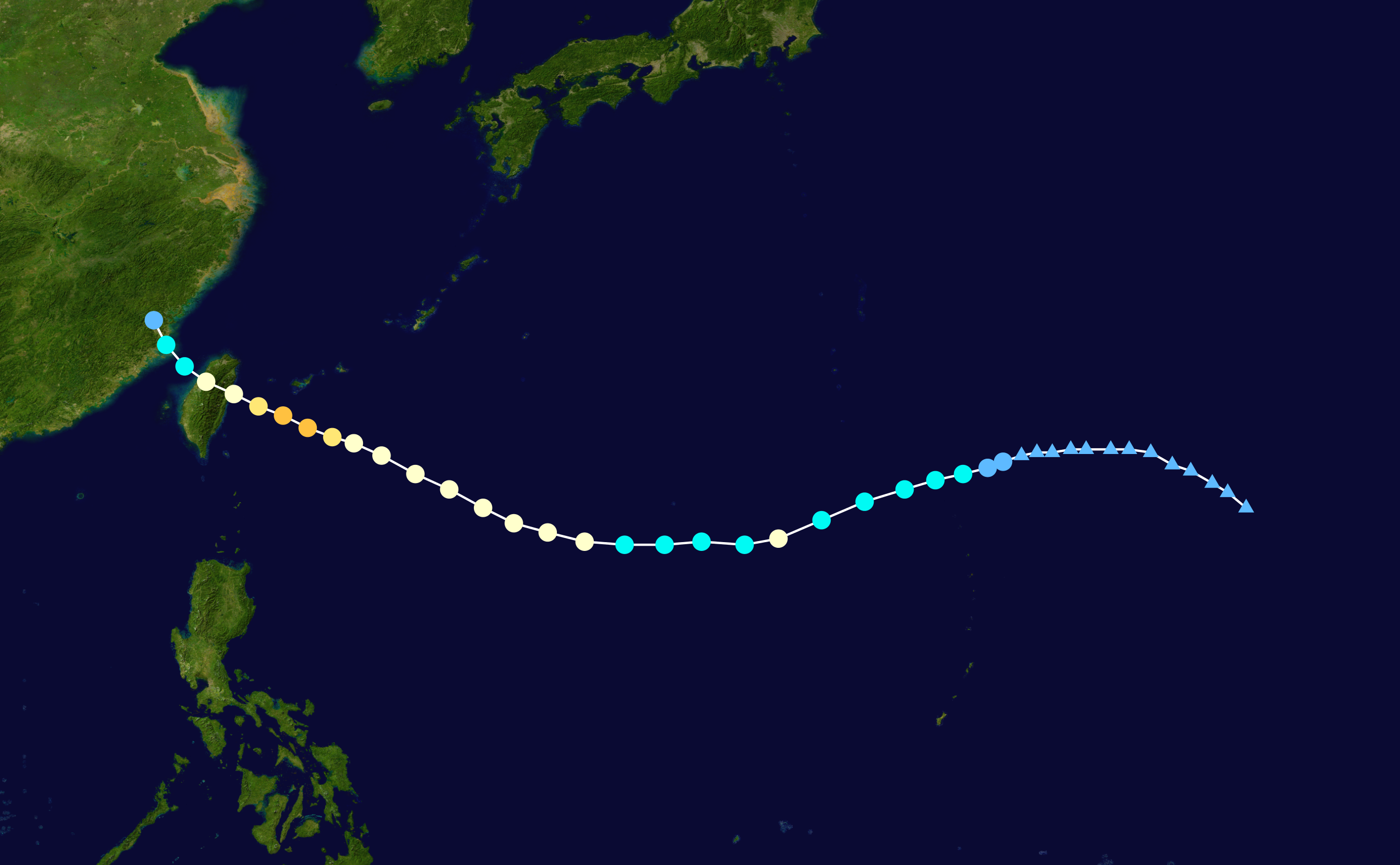
- Duration: July 2 – July 12
- Peak intensity: 185 km/h (115 mph) (1-min); 960 hPa (mbar)

A cold core low developed tropical characteristics and became Tropical Depression 8W on July 6. It tracked westward, becoming a tropical storm later that day and a typhoon on July 7. After briefly weakening to a tropical storm, Clara re-attained typhoon status, and it peaked in intensity on July 10, reaching winds of 115 mph. Clara weakened to a 90 mph typhoon just before hitting Taiwan on the 11th, and it dissipated over China the next day. Clara's heavy rains caused 69 fatalities and a further 32 people to be reported as missing.

=== Tropical Storm Dot ===
- Typhoon (JMA)
- Tropical storm (SSHWS)
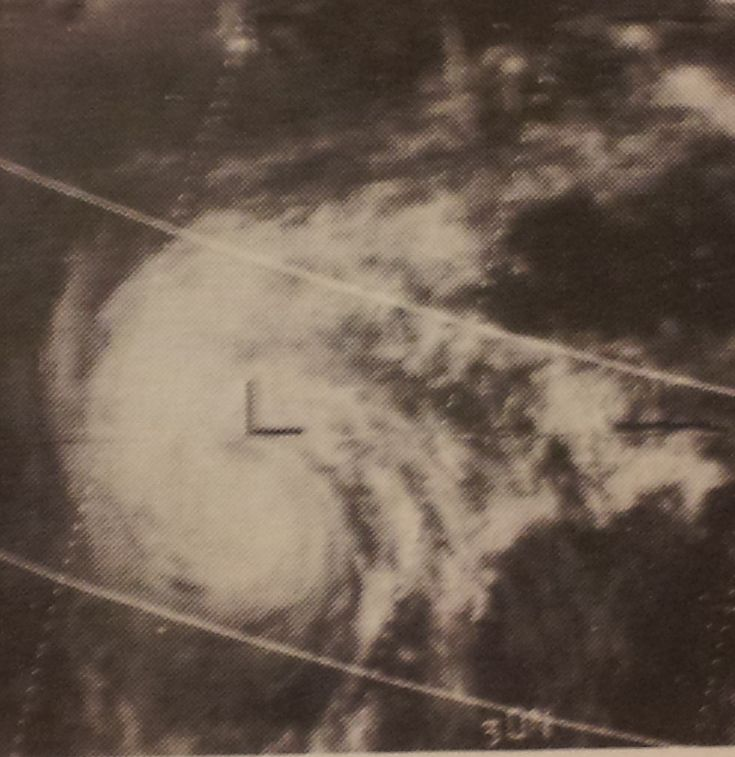
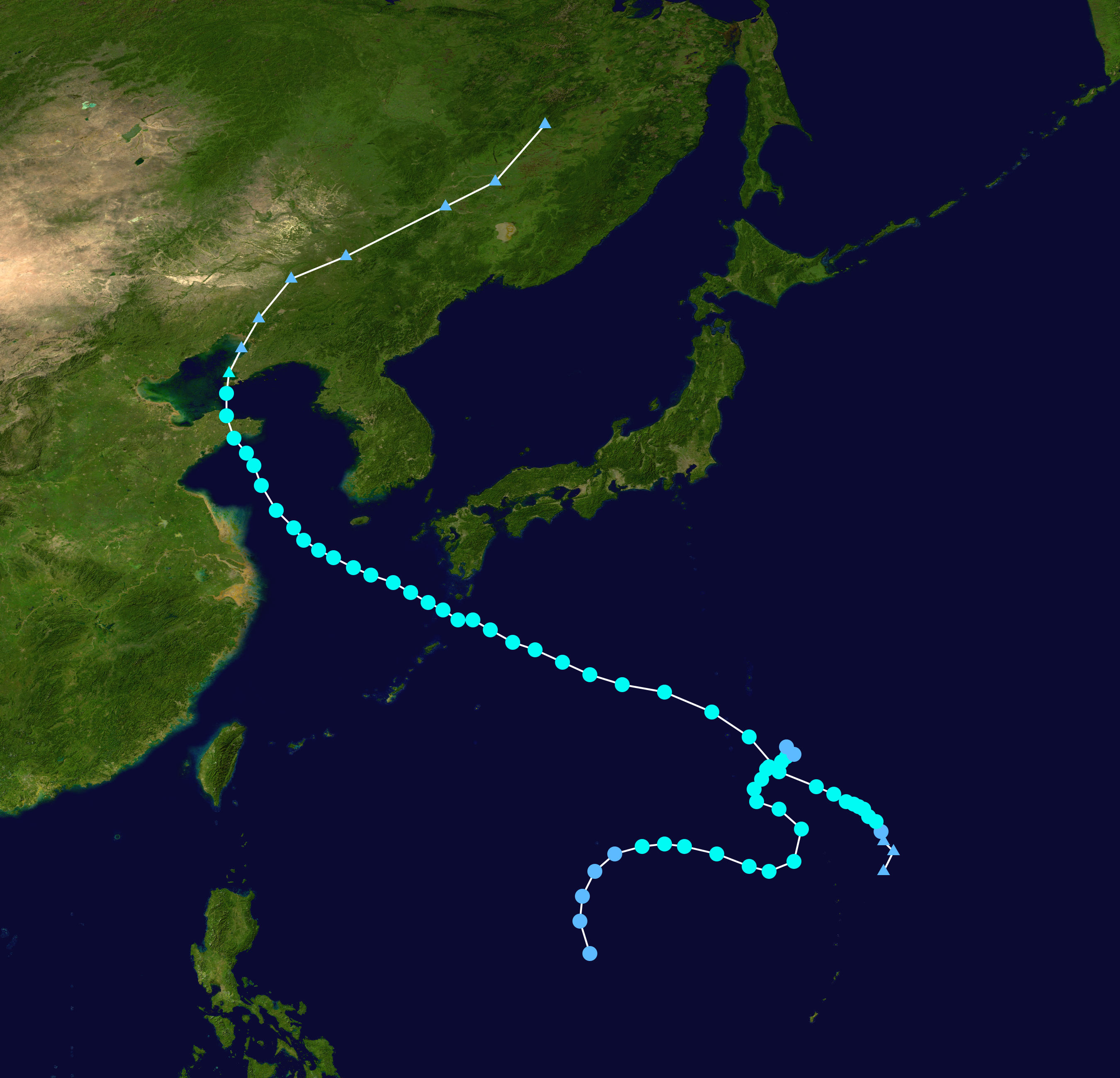
- Duration: July 19 – July 29
- Peak intensity: 110 km/h (70 mph) (1-min); 975 hPa (mbar)

Tropical Storm Dot or Typhoon Dot (per JMA) formed in the western Pacific on July 19 near the Mariana Islands. Initially classified as a tropical depression, it intensified into a tropical storm by July 20, moving west-northwest. Its path soon diverged from typical storms: Dot executed a rare counterclockwise loop east of the Bonin Islands (Iwo Jima) on July 21–22.

Dot reached typhoon status (per JMA) on July 22, achieving peak intensity with sustained winds of 68 knots (125 km/h) and a central pressure of 975 hPa near 22.0°N, 144.3°E 46. The Joint Typhoon Warning Center (JTWC), however, classified it as a tropical storm. After completing its loop, Dot accelerated northeastward, covering 962 km at an average speed of 11.5 km/h.

By July 29, Dot transitioned into an extratropical cyclone southeast of Japan. It fully dissipated on July 31. Dot remained entirely over open ocean, causing no documented land impacts

=== Typhoon Ellen ===
- Typhoon (JMA)
- Category 1 typhoon (SSHWS)
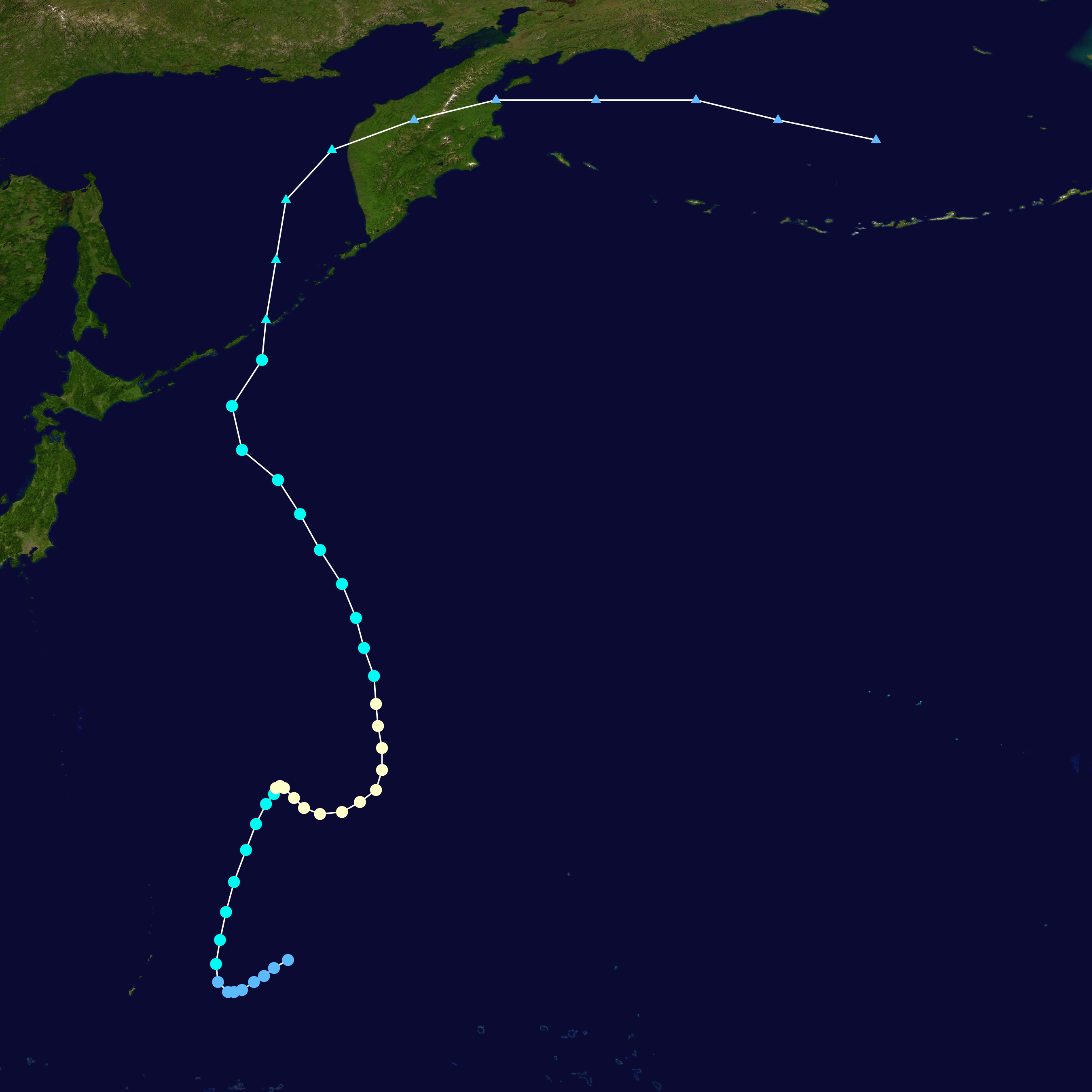
- Duration: July 27 – August 4
- Peak intensity: 150 km/h (90 mph) (1-min); 970 hPa (mbar)

On July 24, the remnants of Tropical Storm Eleanor had crossed over the International Date Line began to stabilize and re-formed into Typhoon Ellen.

=== Tropical Storm Fran (Mameng) ===
- Severe tropical storm (JMA)
- Tropical storm (SSHWS)
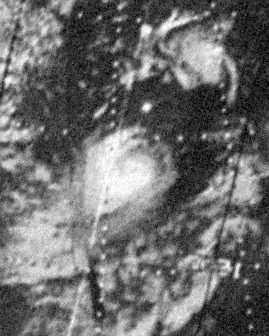
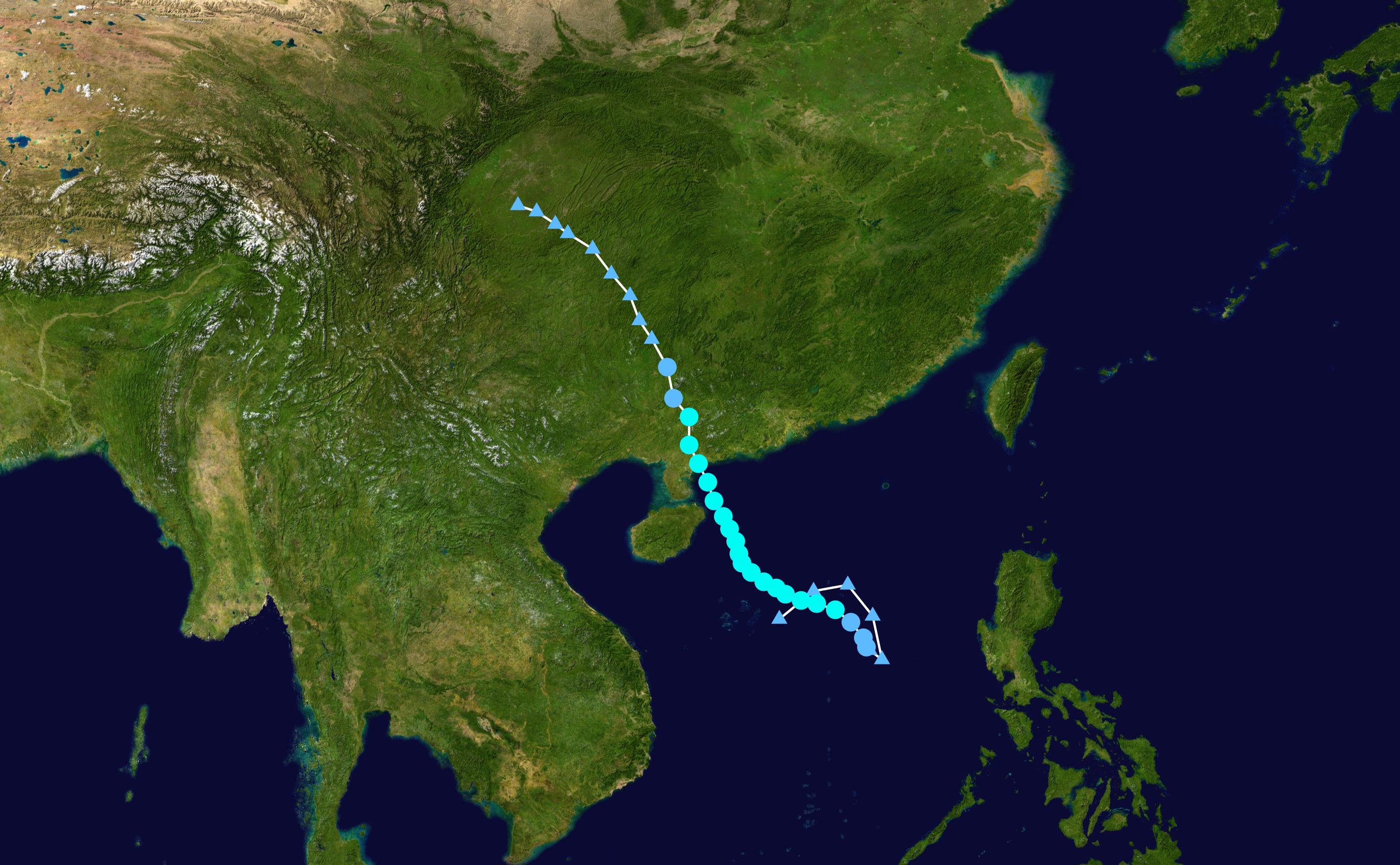
- Duration: July 28 – August 3
- Peak intensity: 110 km/h (70 mph) (1-min); 975 hPa (mbar)

Tropical Storm Fran, designated as "Mameng" by the Philippine Weather Bureau, originated in the western Pacific on July 30 near the South China Sea. The storm tracked steadily westward over the next two days. By July 31, Fran intensified, reaching its peak intensity with sustained winds of 70 mph (110 km/h) and a minimum pressure of 975 hPa. Maintaining a consistent westward trajectory, Fran approached China's southern coast by August 2. At 18:00 UTC, it made landfall south of Guangdong Province as a weakening tropical storm. The system rapidly deteriorated over land, downgrading to a tropical depression within 12 hours. By August 3, Fran dissipated inland.

=== Tropical Storm Georgia (Luding) ===
- Severe tropical storm (JMA)
- Tropical storm (SSHWS)
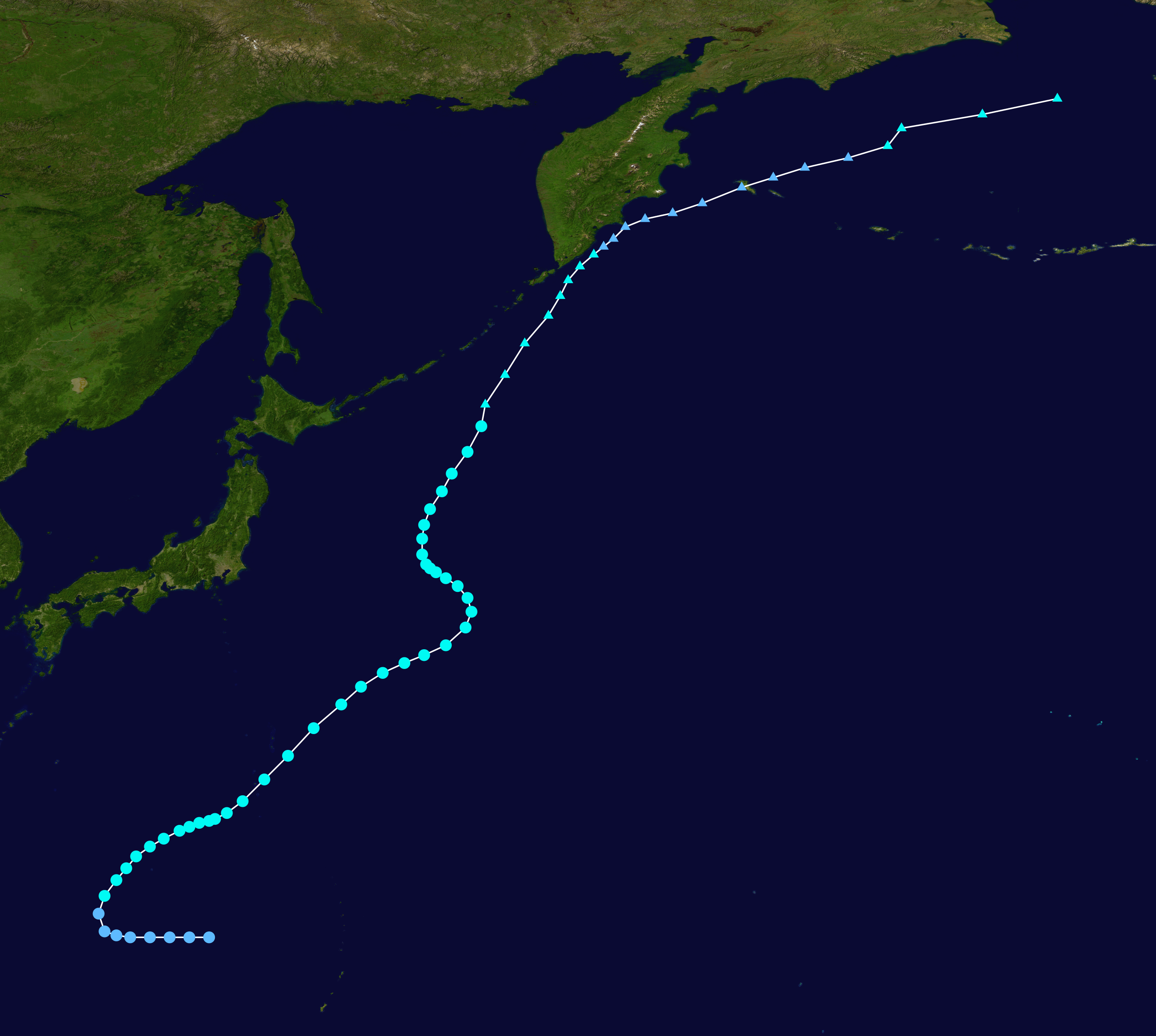
- Duration: July 28 – August 8
- Peak intensity: 110 km/h (70 mph) (1-min); 982 hPa (mbar)

A tropical depression formed in the western Pacific on July 27. Over the next 48 hours, it tracked west-northwestward, intensifying into a tropical storm by July 29. This early phase featured steady organization, with central pressure dropping to 989 hPa by July 30. Georgia reached its peak intensity on August 1–2, with maximum sustained winds of 60 knots (110 km/h) and a central pressure of 982 hPa. The storm then executed a gradual northeastward recurvature east of the Bonin Islands. By August 2, it accelerated toward higher latitudes, maintaining tropical storm strength.

After recurving, Georgia traversed the open Pacific north of 30°N. By August 4, it weakened to a tropical depression, with winds dropping below 35 knots. The system transitioned into an extratropical cyclone by August 8, ultimately dissipating near the Kuril Islands on August 13.

Georgia remained entirely over open ocean, avoiding land impacts.

=== Tropical Storm Hope ===
- Severe tropical storm (JMA)
- Tropical storm (SSHWS)
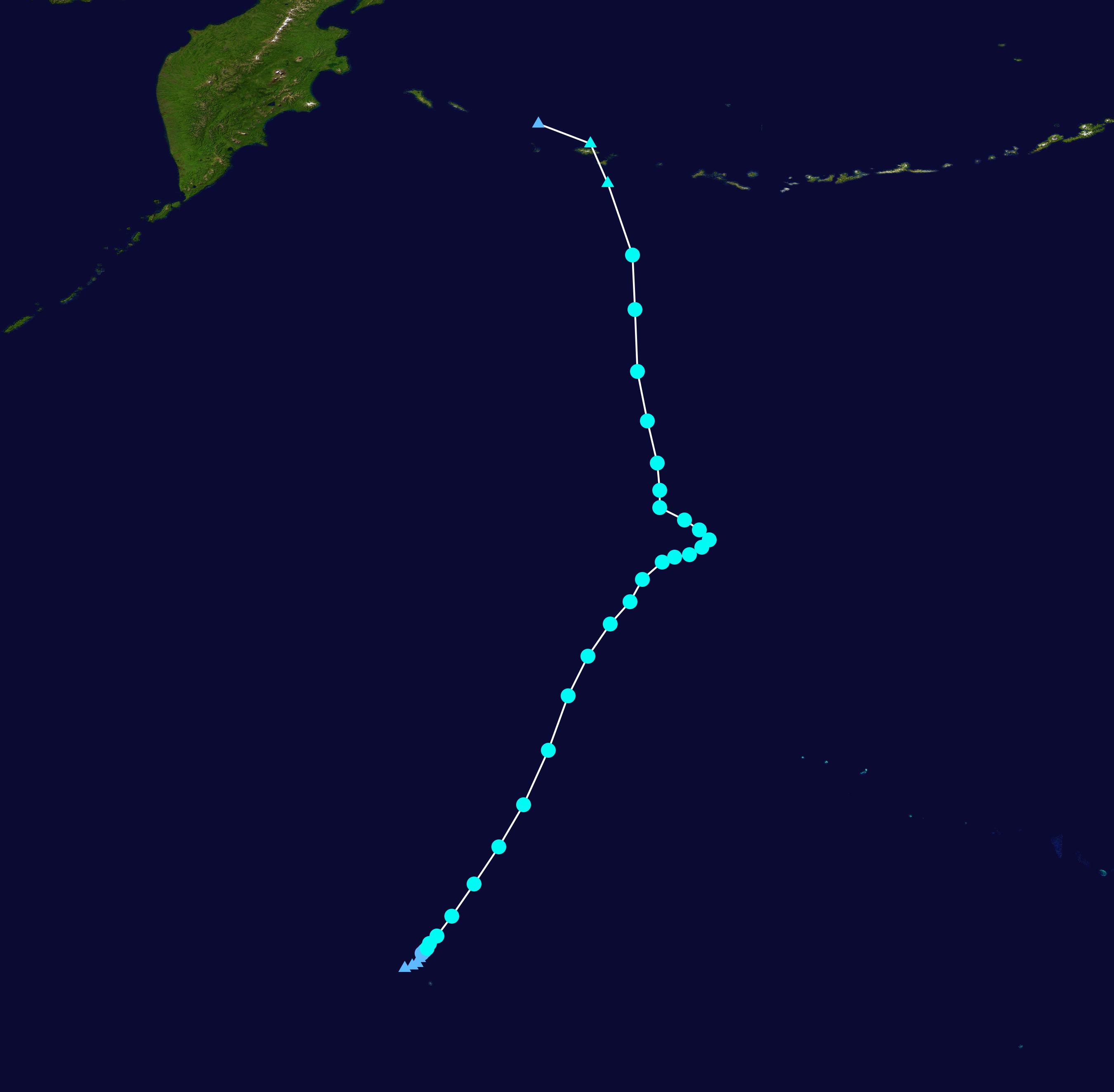
- Duration: August 3 – August 11
- Peak intensity: 110 km/h (70 mph) (1-min); 984 hPa (mbar)

The remnants of Tropical Storm Hope contributed to an atmospheric river oriented towards Interior Alaska that caused the 1967 Fairbanks flood, the worst and most damaging flooding in Fairbanks' history.

=== Tropical Depression Neneng ===
- Tropical depression (PAGASA)
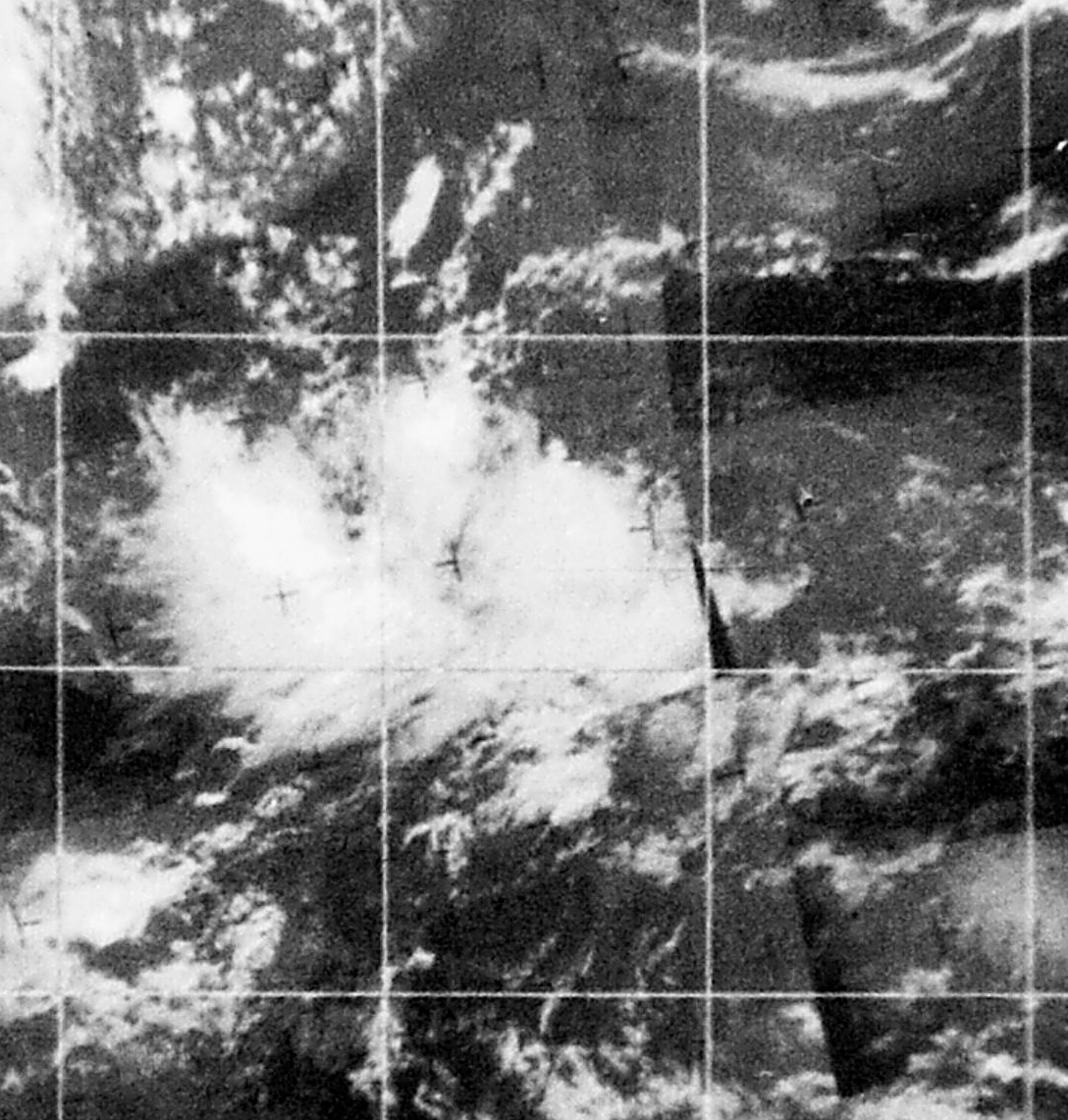
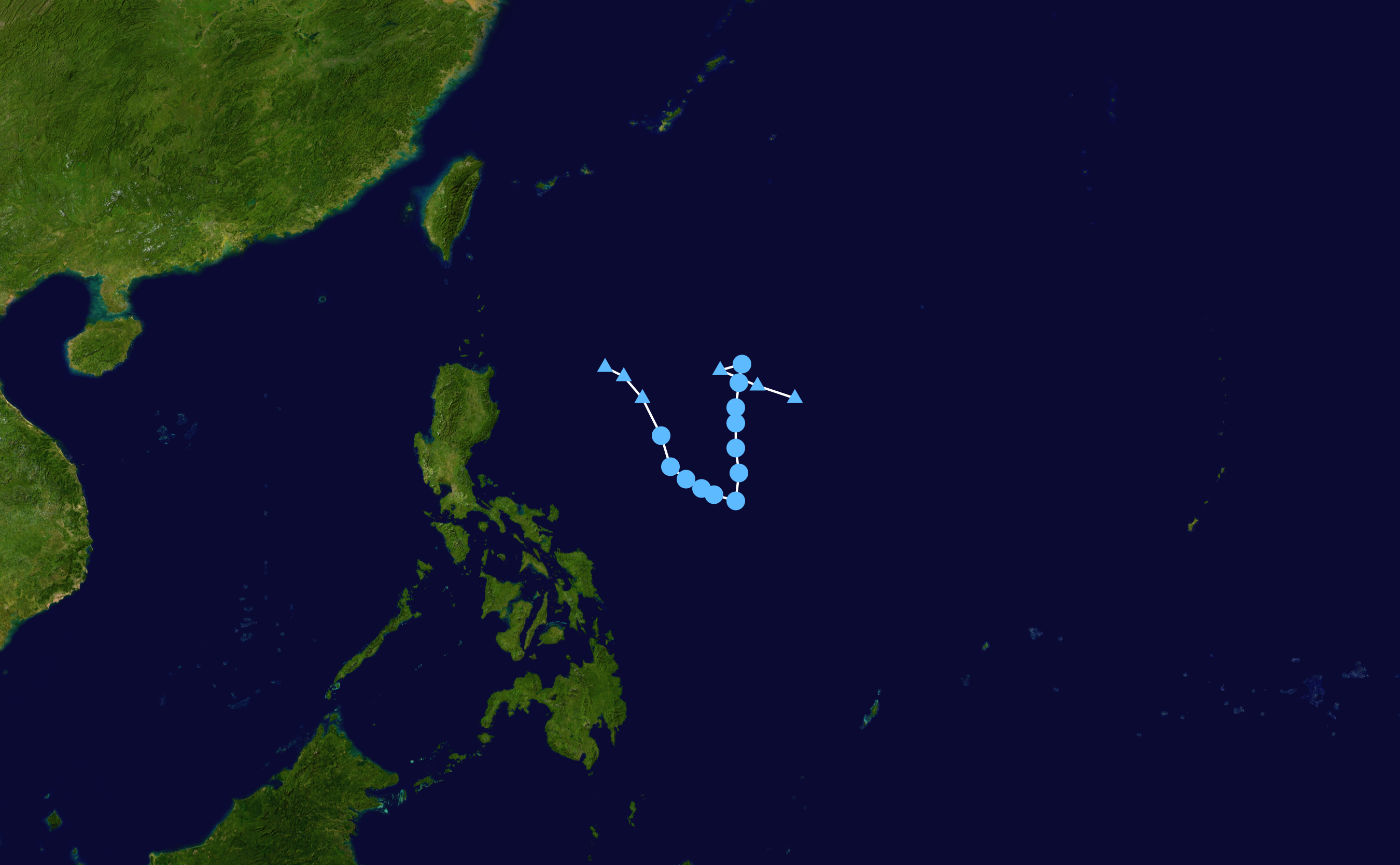
- Duration: August 5 – August 8
- Peak intensity: 55 km/h (35 mph) (10-min); 999 hPa (mbar)

Tropical Depression Neneng was a short-lived weather system. Designated solely by the Philippine Weather Bureau (which eventually became the PAGASA), this system was not internationally recognized by the Joint Typhoon Warning Center (JTWC) or the Japan Meteorological Agency (JMA), reflecting its limited intensity and impact. Neneng formed within the Philippine Area of Responsibility (PAR) on August 5, though precise dates and coordinates are not documented in available records. It followed a westward or west-northwestward track. The depression dissipated rapidly over the Philippine Sea without making landfall. Its lifespan was notably brief. No damage, rainfall data, or hazards were documented.

=== Tropical Depression 16W ===
- Tropical depression (JMA)
- Tropical depression (SSHWS)
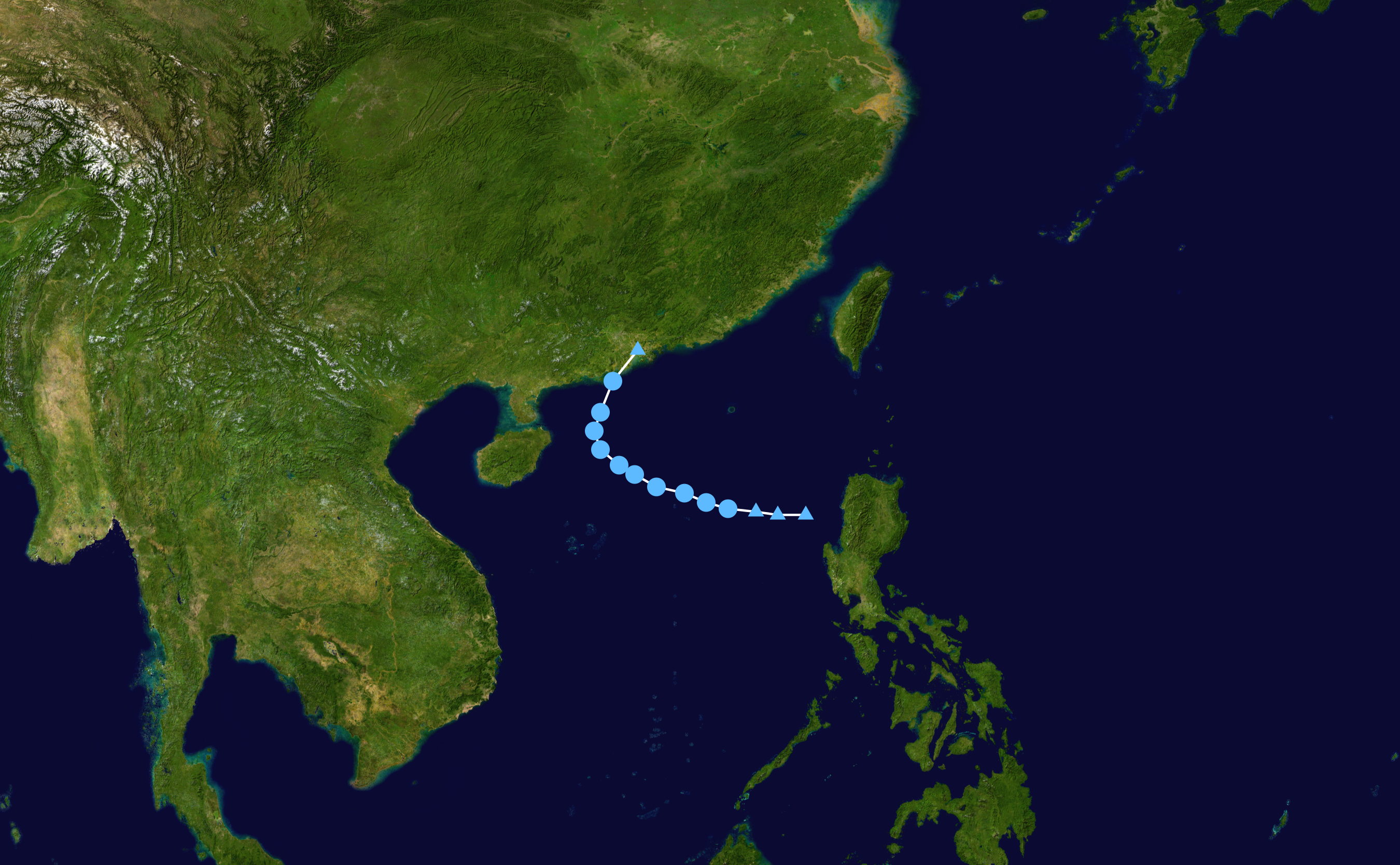
- Duration: August 9 – August 11
- Peak intensity: 55 km/h (35 mph) (1-min); 995 hPa (mbar)

Tropical Depression 16W originated in the South China Sea on August 8. Initially classified as a low-pressure area, it organized into a tropical depression by August 9, tracking steadily westward. The depression reached its peak intensity on August 10–11, with maximum sustained winds of 30 knots (55 km/h) and a central pressure of 995 hPa northwest of Hainan Island, China. Despite brief consolidation, it remained a shallow system. Satellite and ship data indicated a broad circulation with scattered convection, characteristic of a monsoon depression rather than a tightly organized tropical cyclone. By August 11, 16W weakened to a remnant low just west of the Leizhou Peninsula, and dissipated shortly after making landfall near Macau.

=== Tropical Storm 17W ===
- Tropical storm (JMA)
- Tropical storm (SSHWS)
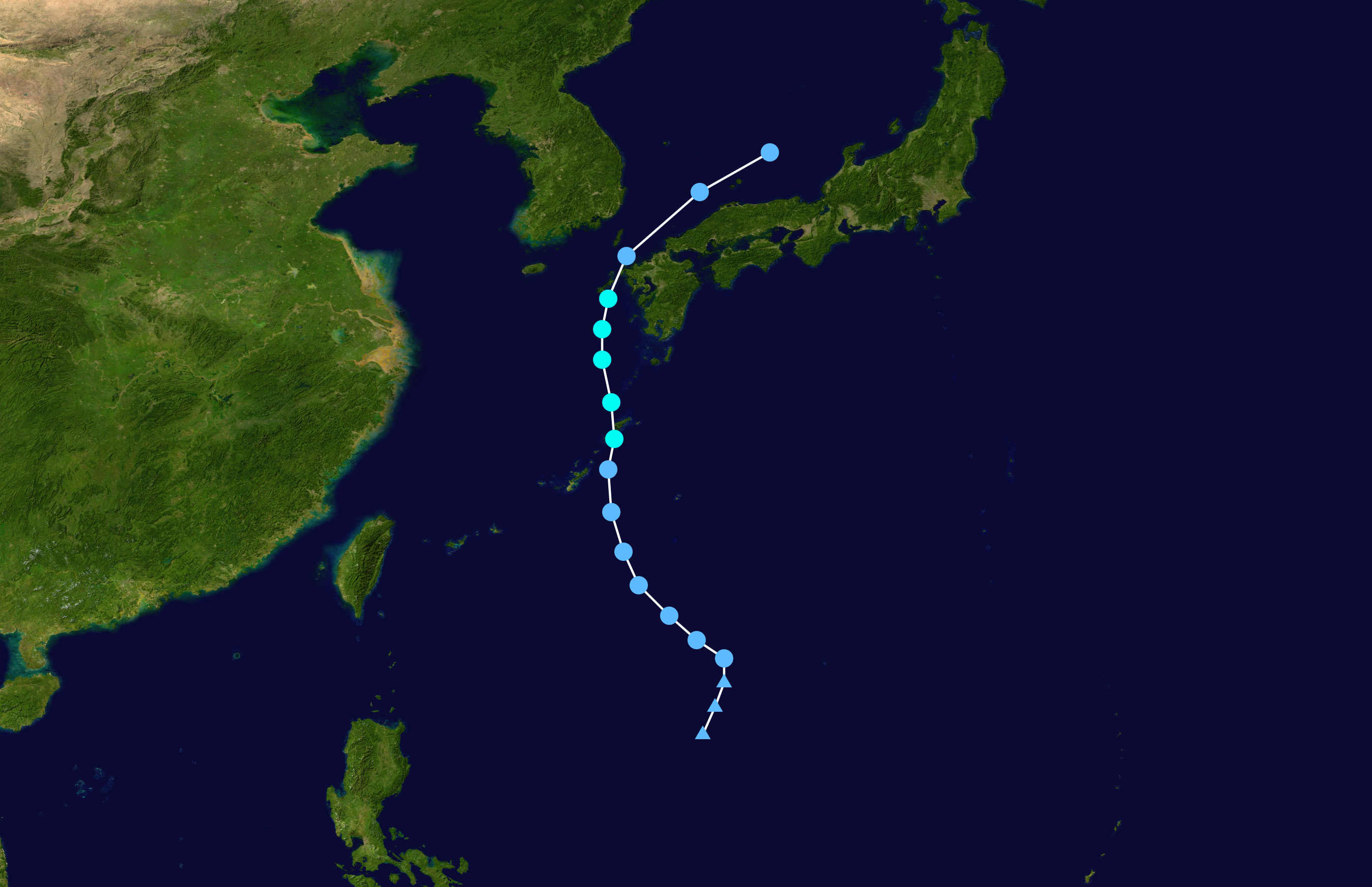
- Duration: August 9 – August 13
- Peak intensity: 95 km/h (60 mph) (1-min); 988 hPa (mbar)

A tropical disturbance was noted on August 9. It moved north-northwestward, and intensified into a tropical depression. 17W reached its peak intensity on August 12, with winds of 95 km/h (60 mph) and lowest central pressure of 988hPa (mbar). It later weakened when passing west of Japan and dissipated on August 13. Despite its intensity, the storm was not named.

=== Tropical Storm Iris (Oniang) ===
- Tropical storm (JMA)
- Tropical storm (SSHWS)
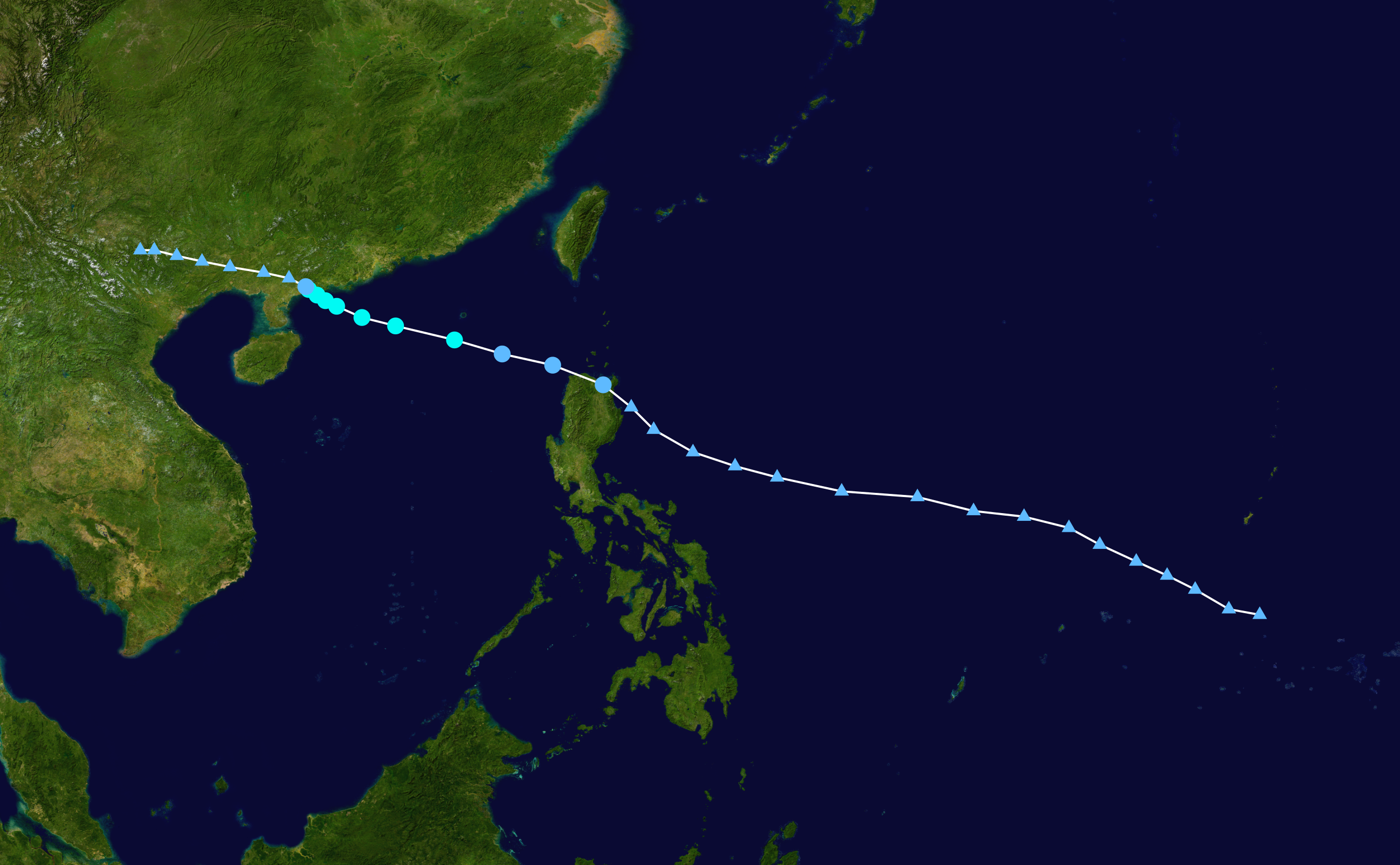
- Duration: August 10 – August 18
- Peak intensity: 75 km/h (45 mph) (1-min); 994 hPa (mbar)

Tropical Storm Iris originated in the western Pacific on August 10, southeast of the Mariana Islands. Initially classified as a low-pressure area, it tracked steadily westward over the Philippine Sea, gaining organization as it progressed. By August 14, it intensified into a tropical depression. The system continued strengthening, achieving tropical storm status by August 15 near the Luzon.

Iris reached its peak intensity on August 15–16, with sustained winds of 40 knots (75 km/h) and a central pressure of 990 hPa while positioned northwest of Luzon, Philippines. Maintaining a consistent westward trajectory, the storm entered the South China Sea. By August 16, Iris made landfall in the southern coast of Guangdong, China.

After landfall, Iris rapidly deteriorated. By August 17, it downgraded to a tropical depression and dissipated inland over northern Vietnam on August 18.

=== Tropical Storm Louise ===
- Severe tropical storm (JMA)
- Tropical storm (SSHWS)
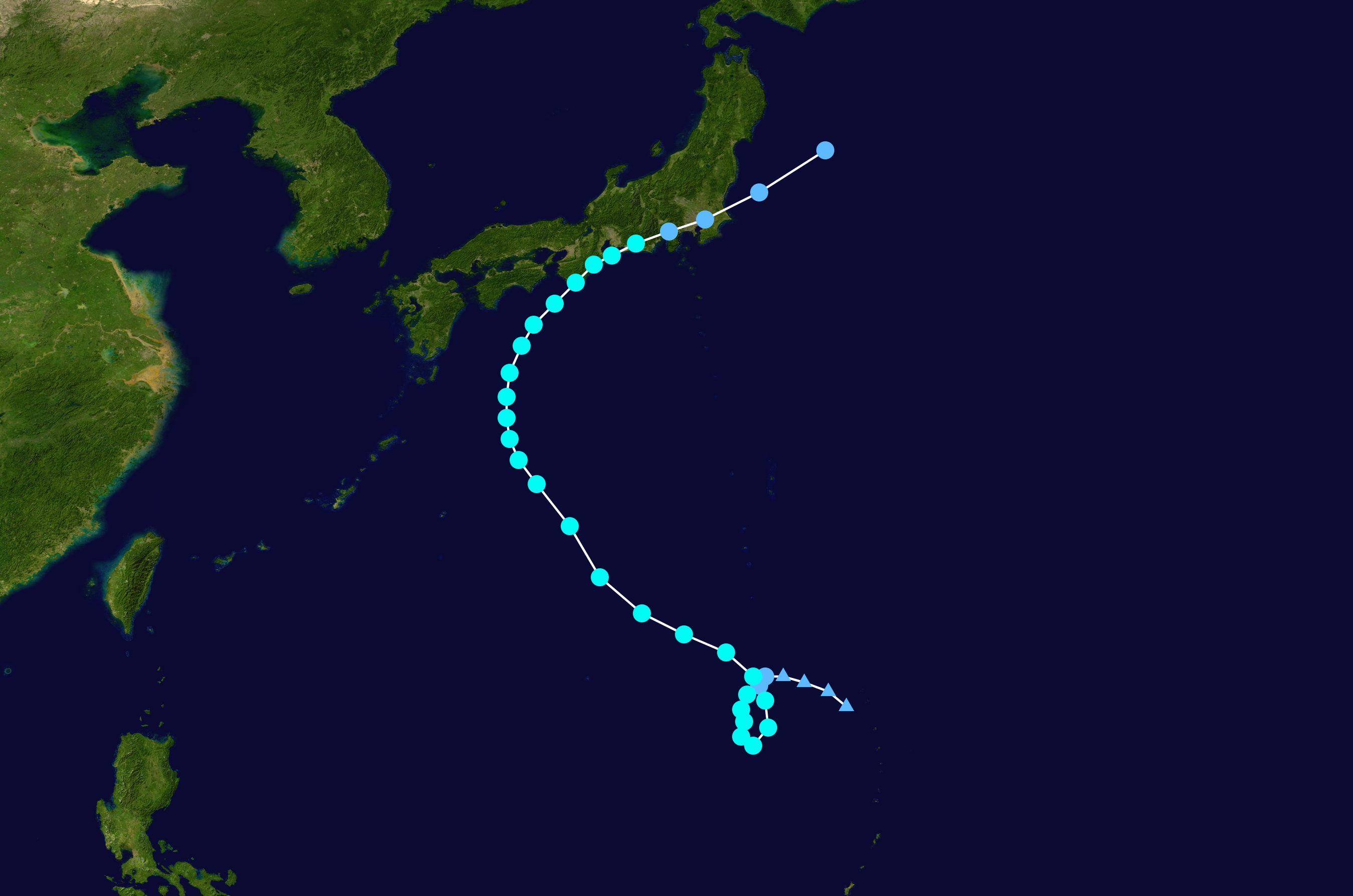
- Duration: August 15 – August 24
- Peak intensity: 100 km/h (65 mph) (1-min); 980 hPa (mbar)

Louise originated from a low-pressure area in the western Pacific on August 15, southeast of the Mariana Islands. Initially classified as a tropical disturbance with winds of 20 knots and a central pressure of 1005 hPa, it drifted westward over its first 24 hours. By August 16, the system intensified into a tropical depression (30 knots) and further strengthened to tropical storm status (35 knots) by August 16–17, while executing a small counterclockwise loop. Louise reached its peak intensity on August 20–21, with sustained winds of 55 knots (102 km/h) and a central pressure of 975 hPa near approximately 400 km south of Kyushu, Japan. The storm maintained tropical storm strength as it approached Japan's coast. On August 21, Louise made landfall near Shikoku. By August 22, winds dropped to 45 knots as it crossed Honshu. Louise fully dissipated east of Japan on August 24. Louise caused no documented casualties.

=== Tropical Storm Joan ===
- Severe tropical storm (JMA)
- Tropical storm (SSHWS)
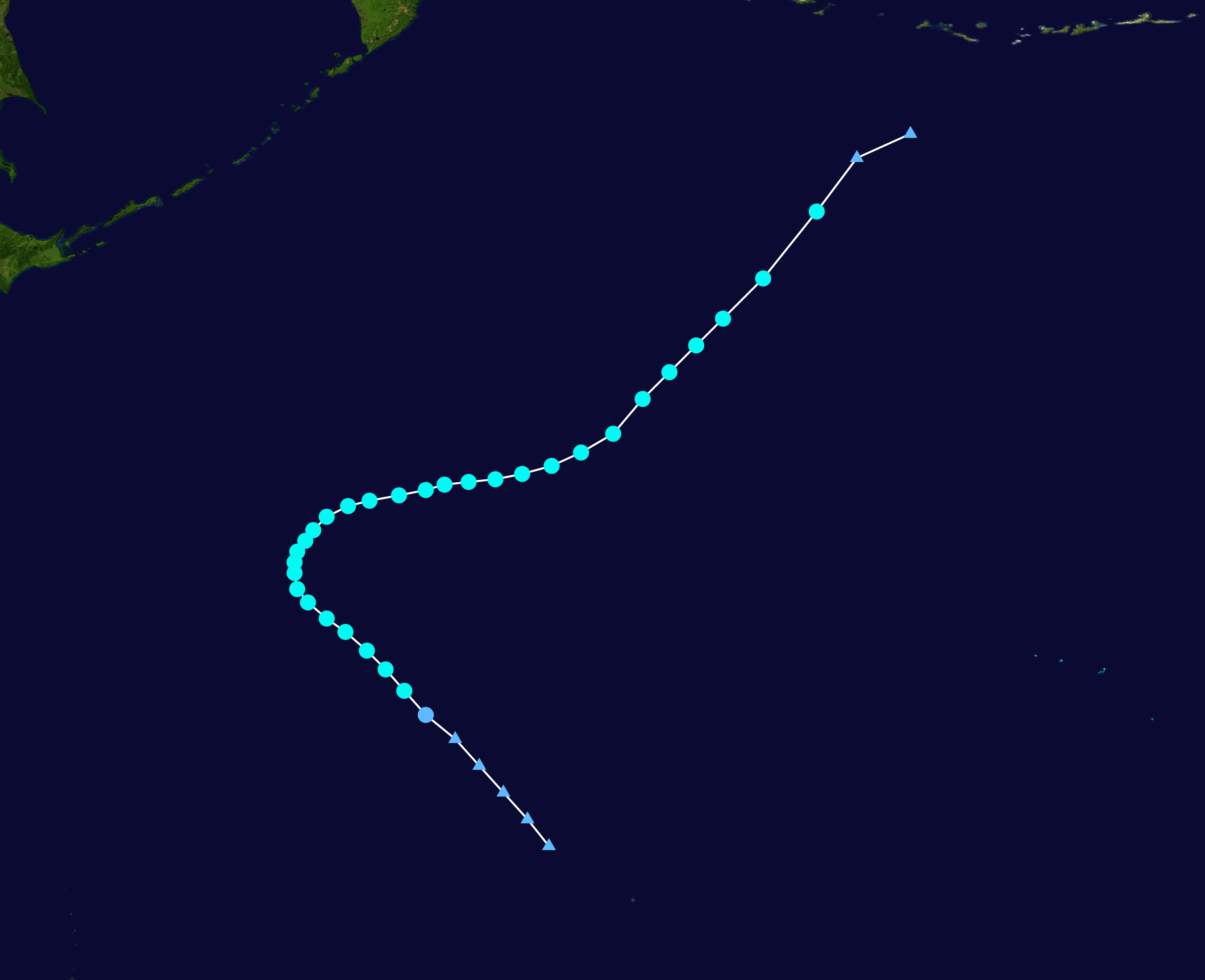
- Duration: August 16 – August 25
- Peak intensity: 100 km/h (65 mph) (1-min); 988 hPa (mbar)

Severe Tropical Storm Joan originated as a low-pressure area over the central Pacific Ocean on August 16. Initially classified as a tropical disturbance, it tracked steadily west-northwestward over the next 48 hours. By August 18, the system intensified into a tropical depression and further strengthened to tropical storm status. Joan reached its peak intensity on August 19, with sustained winds of 55 knots (102 km/h) and a central pressure of 988 hPa. The storm maintained this strength for 24 hours while executing a gradual northward recurvature.

By August 20, Joan's winds dropped to 50 knots (93 km/h) as it accelerated northeastward. It transitioned into an extratropical cyclone on August 25. The remnant system dissipated over the open North Pacific on August 26.

=== Typhoon Kate (Pepang) ===
- Typhoon (JMA)
- Category 1 typhoon (SSHWS)
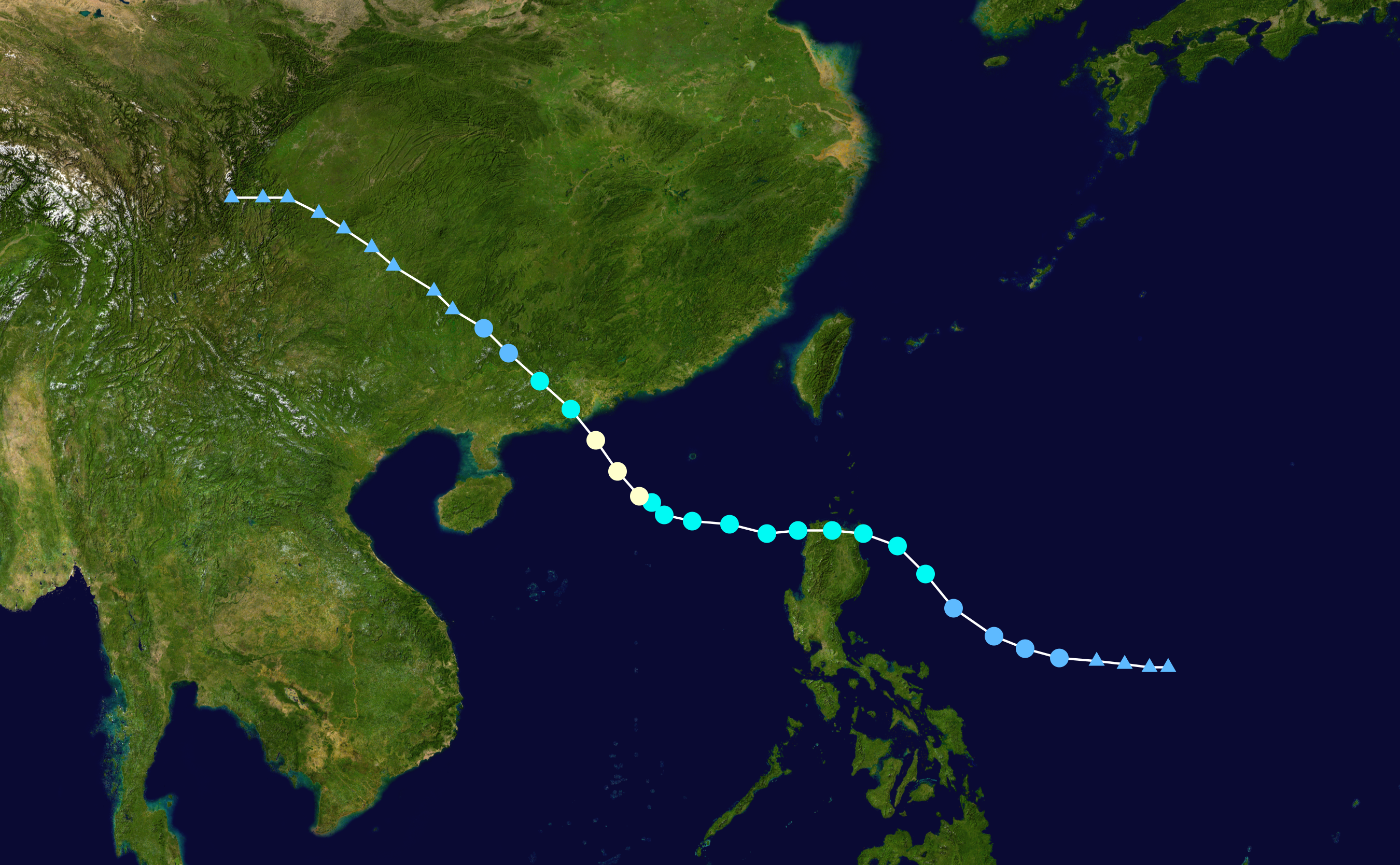
- Duration: August 16 – August 24
- Peak intensity: 130 km/h (80 mph) (1-min); 982 hPa (mbar)

Kate made landfall in China as a tropical storm.

=== Typhoon Marge (Rosing) ===
- Typhoon (JMA)
- Category 4 typhoon (SSHWS)
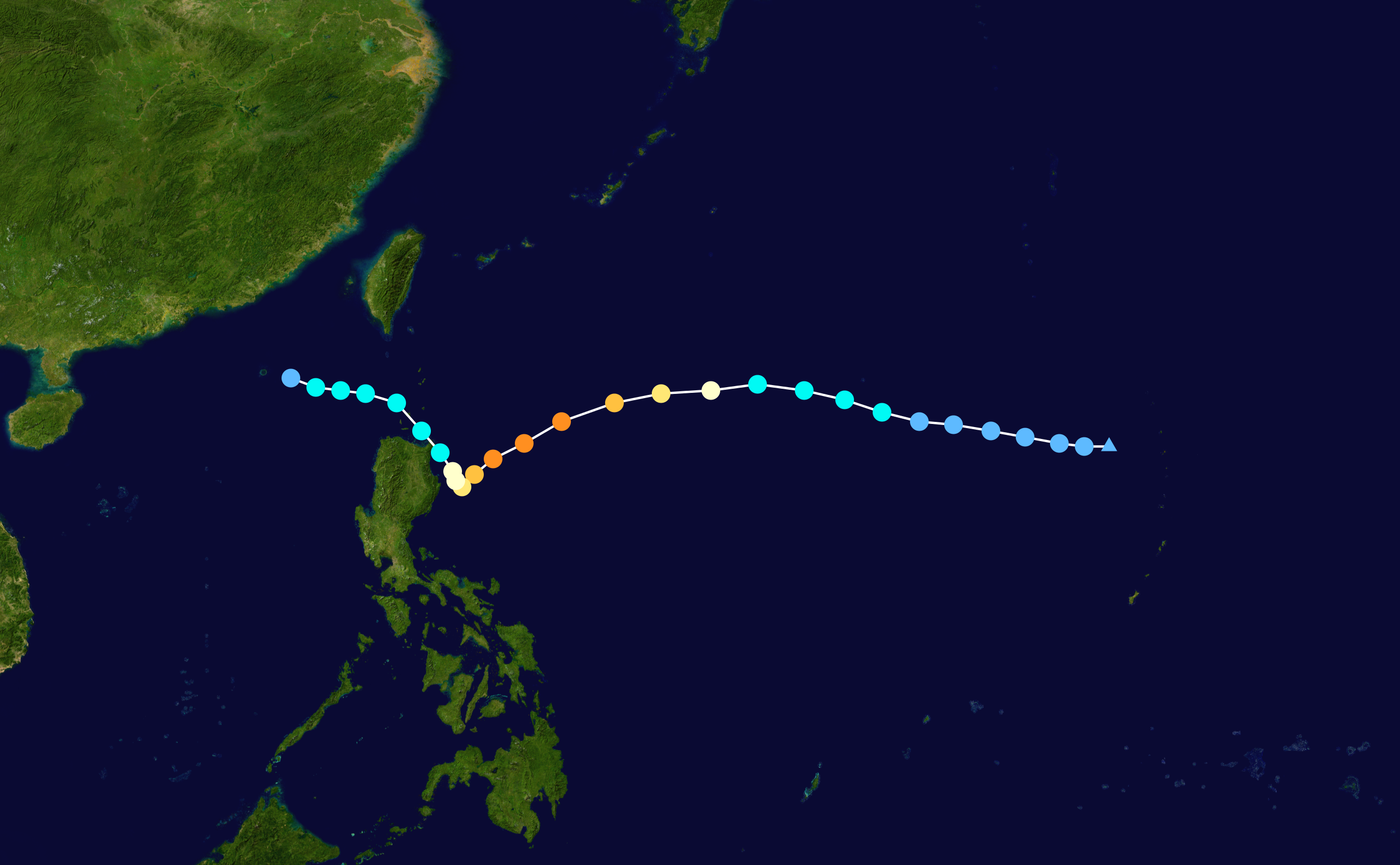
- Duration: August 23 – August 30
- Peak intensity: 230 km/h (145 mph) (1-min); 940 hPa (mbar)

Marge hit the Philippines.

=== Tropical Depression 23W ===
- Tropical depression (JMA)
- Tropical depression (SSHWS)
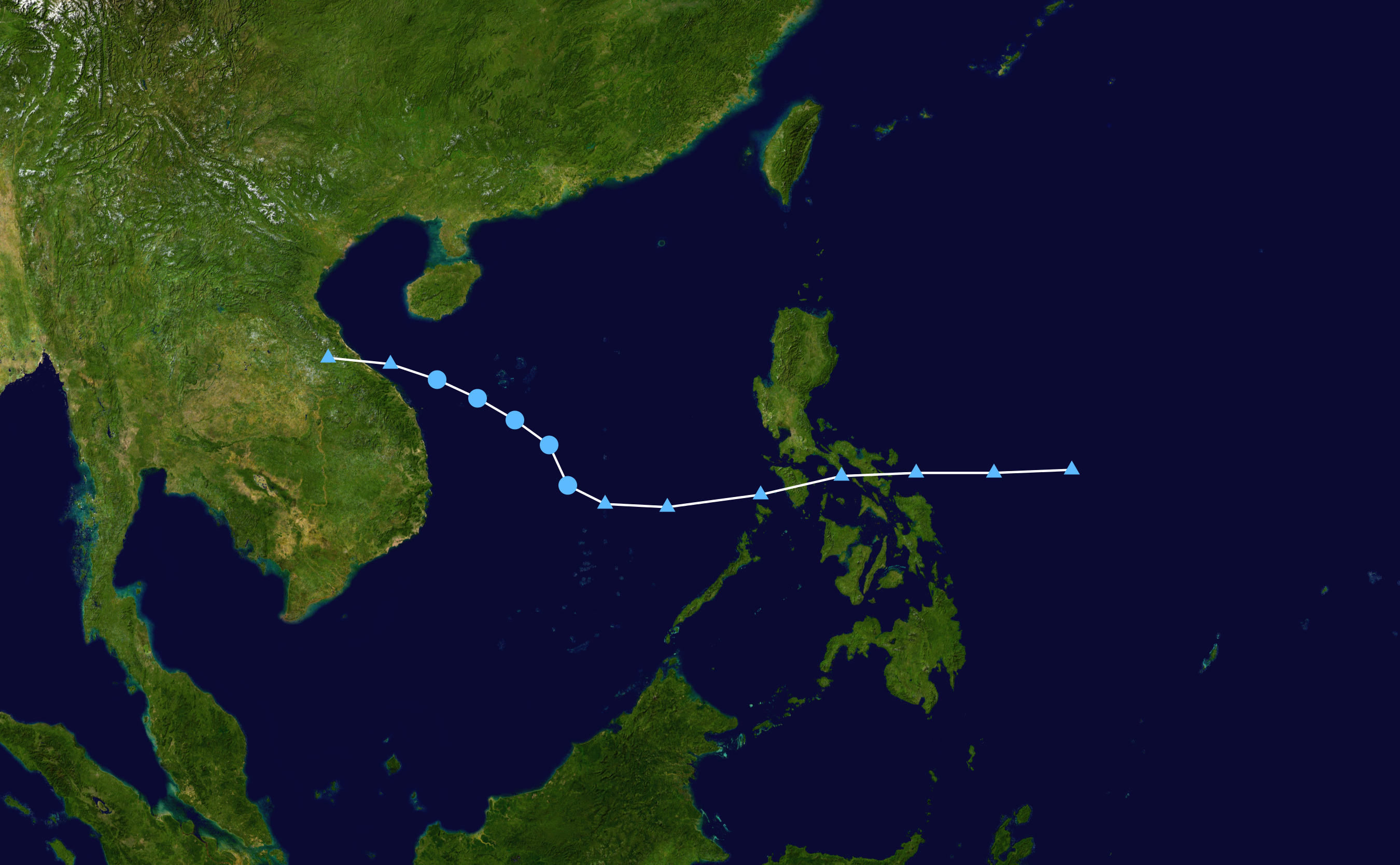
- Duration: August 25 – August 26
- Peak intensity: 45 km/h (30 mph) (1-min); 998 hPa (mbar)

23W hit the Philippines and Vietnam.

=== Typhoon Nora (Sisang) ===
- Typhoon (JMA)
- Category 1 typhoon (SSHWS)
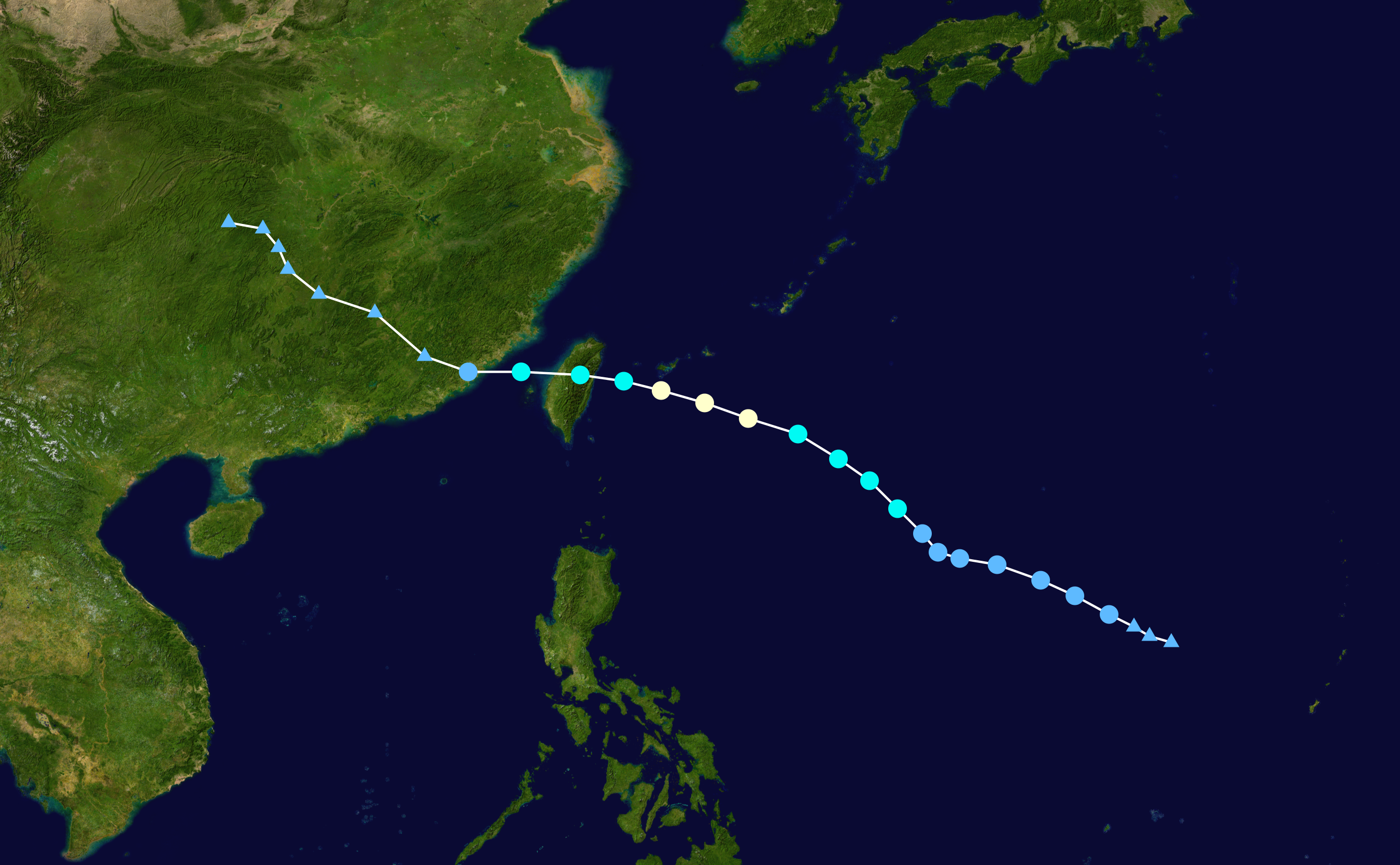
- Duration: August 25 – September 1
- Peak intensity: 130 km/h (80 mph) (1-min); 990 hPa (mbar)

Nora hit Taiwan and Fujian as a tropical storm.

=== Super Typhoon Opal ===
- Typhoon (JMA)
- Category 5 super typhoon (SSHWS)
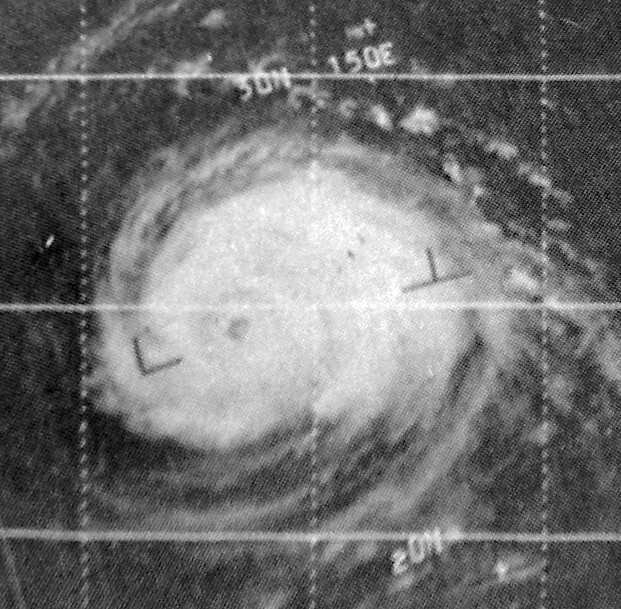
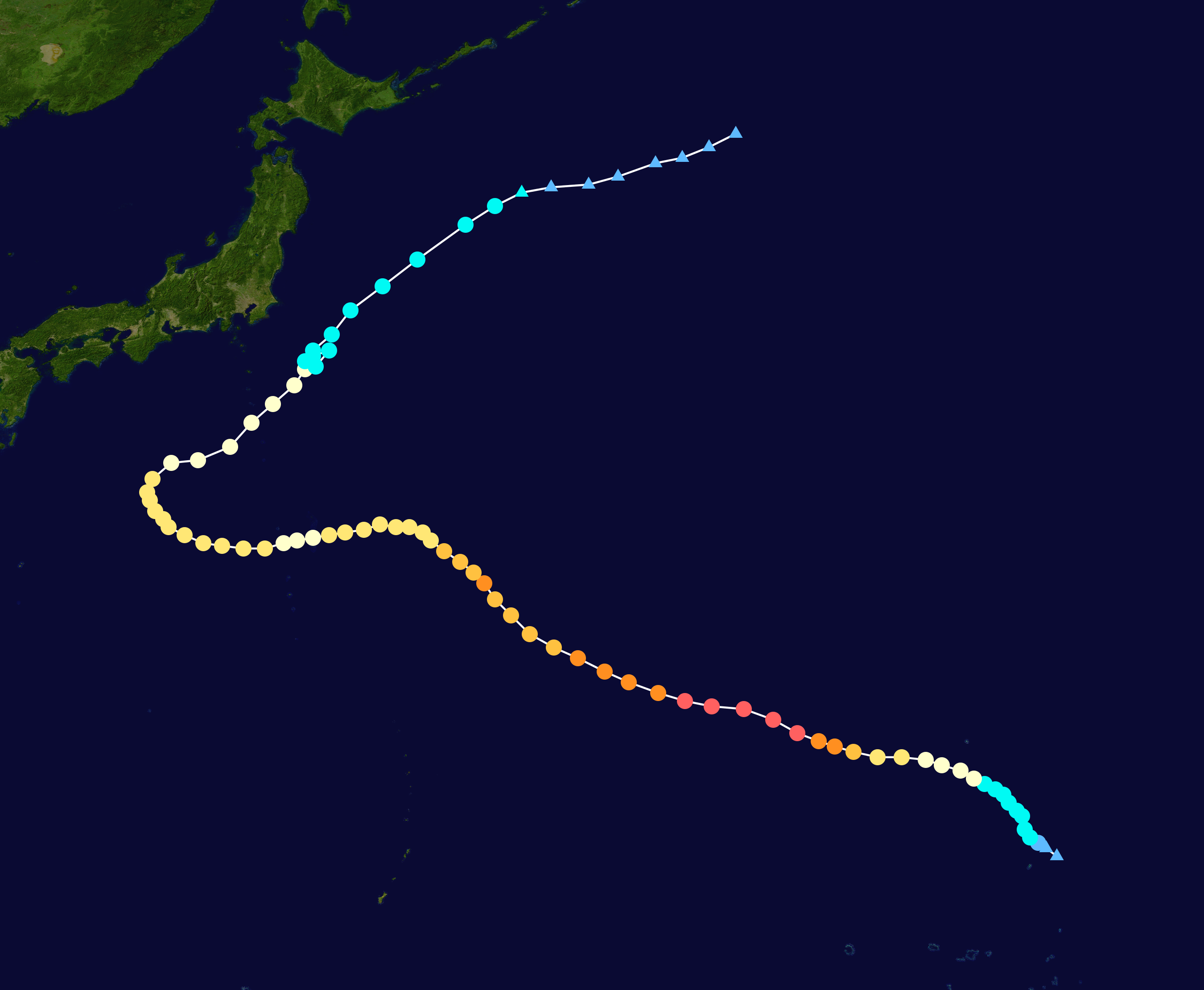
- Duration: August 29 – September 17
- Peak intensity: 285 km/h (180 mph) (1-min); 920 hPa (mbar)

Super Typhoon Opal was a powerful system that peaked in winds of 180 miles per hour (mph), the equivalent of a Category 5 hurricane.

=== Tropical Storm Patsy ===
- Tropical storm (JMA)
- Tropical storm (SSHWS)
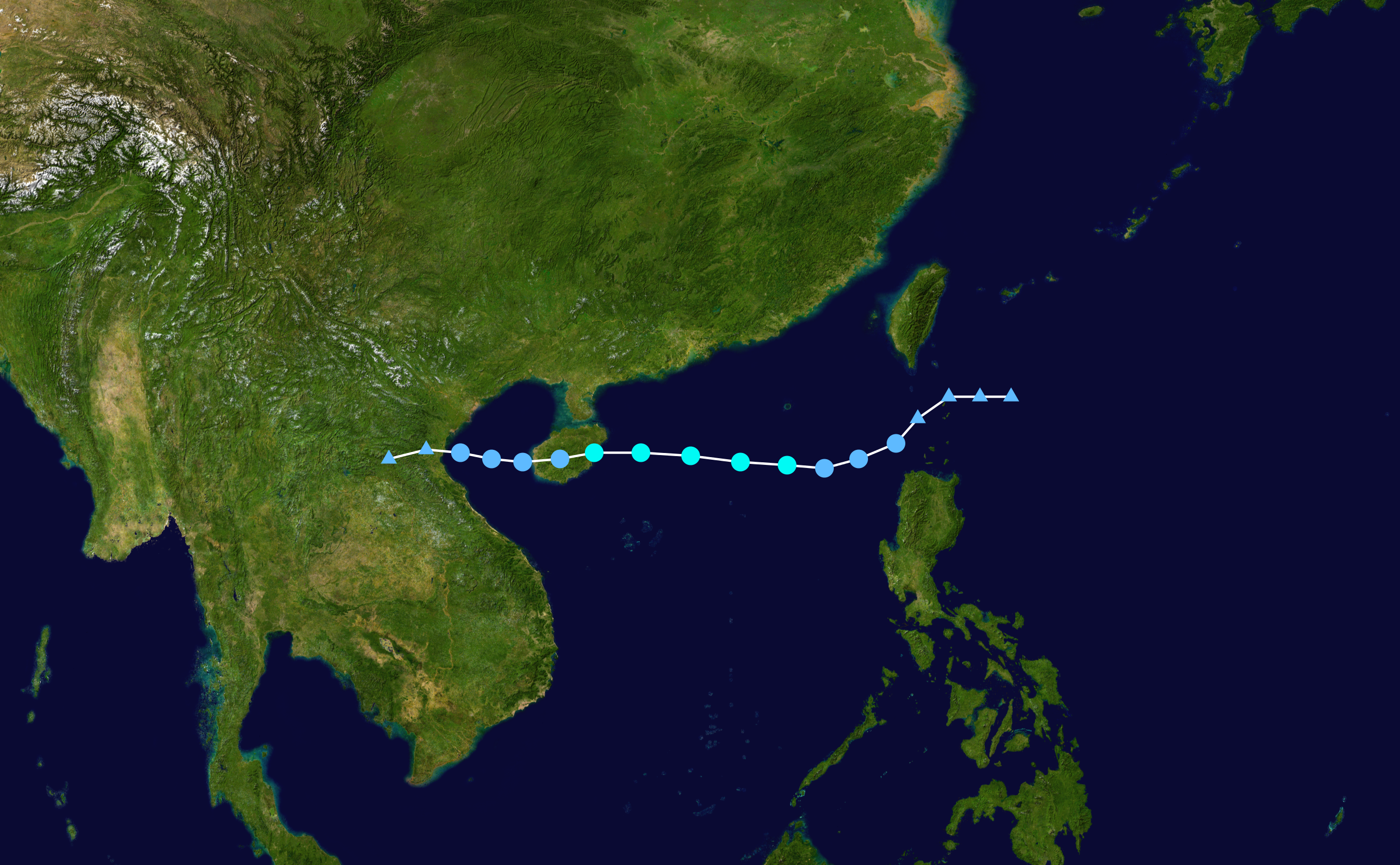
- Duration: September 3 – September 7
- Peak intensity: 95 km/h (60 mph) (1-min); 995 hPa (mbar)

Pasty hit China as a tropical storm.

=== Typhoon Ruth ===
- Typhoon (JMA)
- Category 3 typhoon (SSHWS)
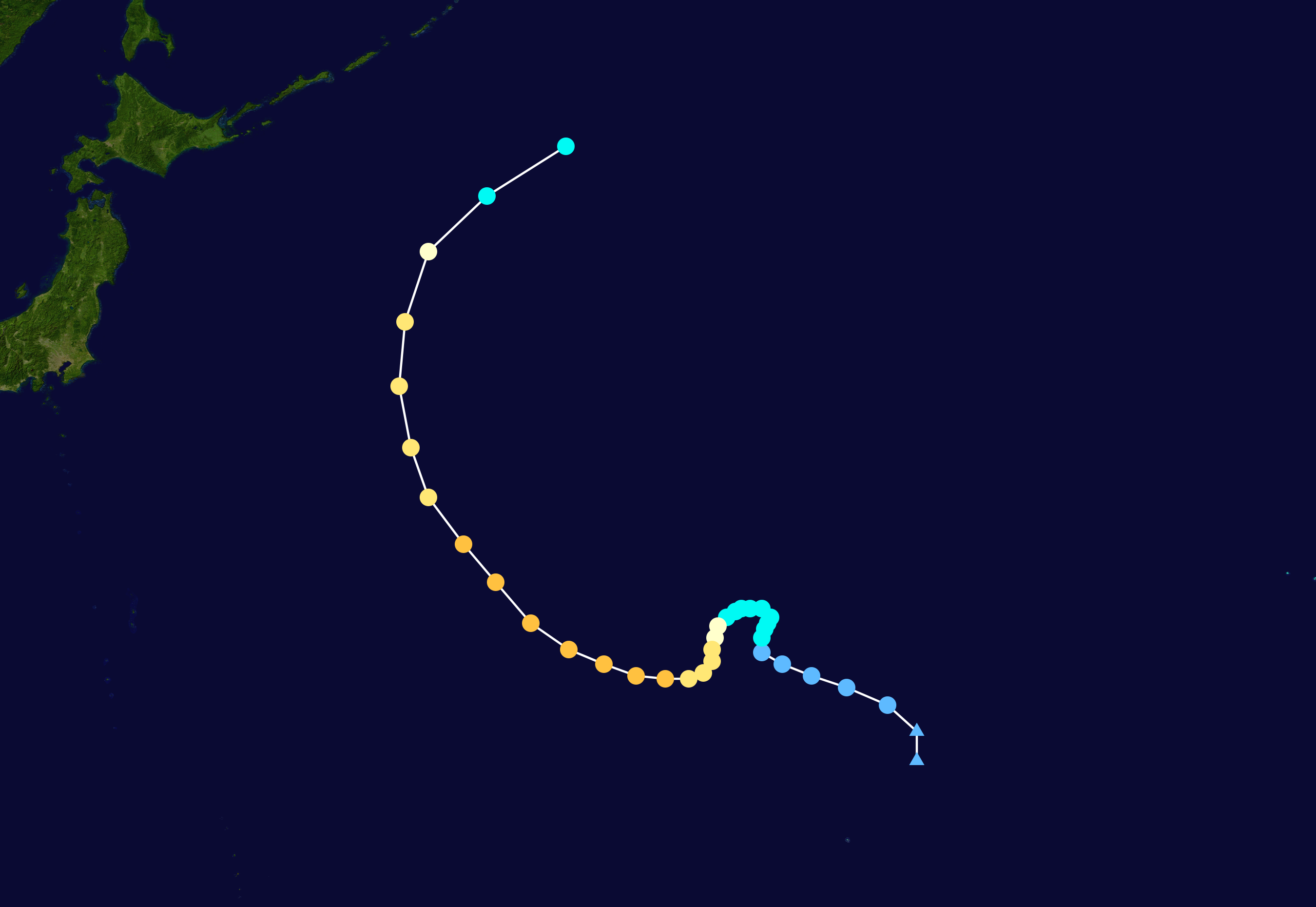
- Duration: September 5 – September 14
- Peak intensity: 205 km/h (125 mph) (1-min); 940 hPa (mbar)

Ruth was a Category 3 typhoon that stayed out to sea.

=== Tropical Storm Thelma ===
- Tropical storm (JMA)
- Tropical storm (SSHWS)
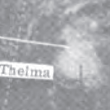
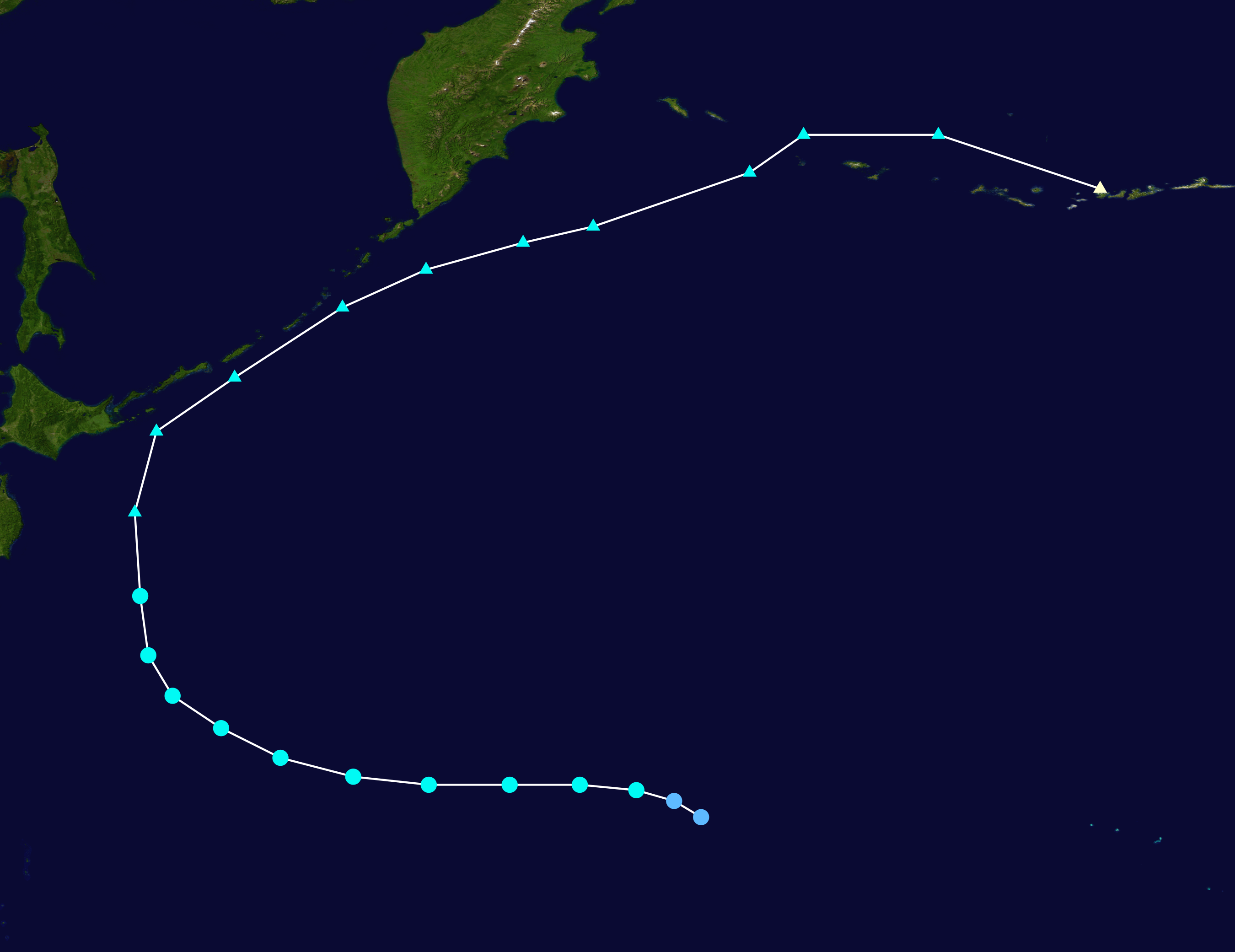
- Duration: September 10 – September 12
- Peak intensity: 95 km/h (60 mph) (1-min); 990 hPa (mbar)

Thelma was a tropical storm that did not affect land.

=== Tropical Storm Vera ===
- Severe tropical storm (JMA)
- Tropical storm (SSHWS)
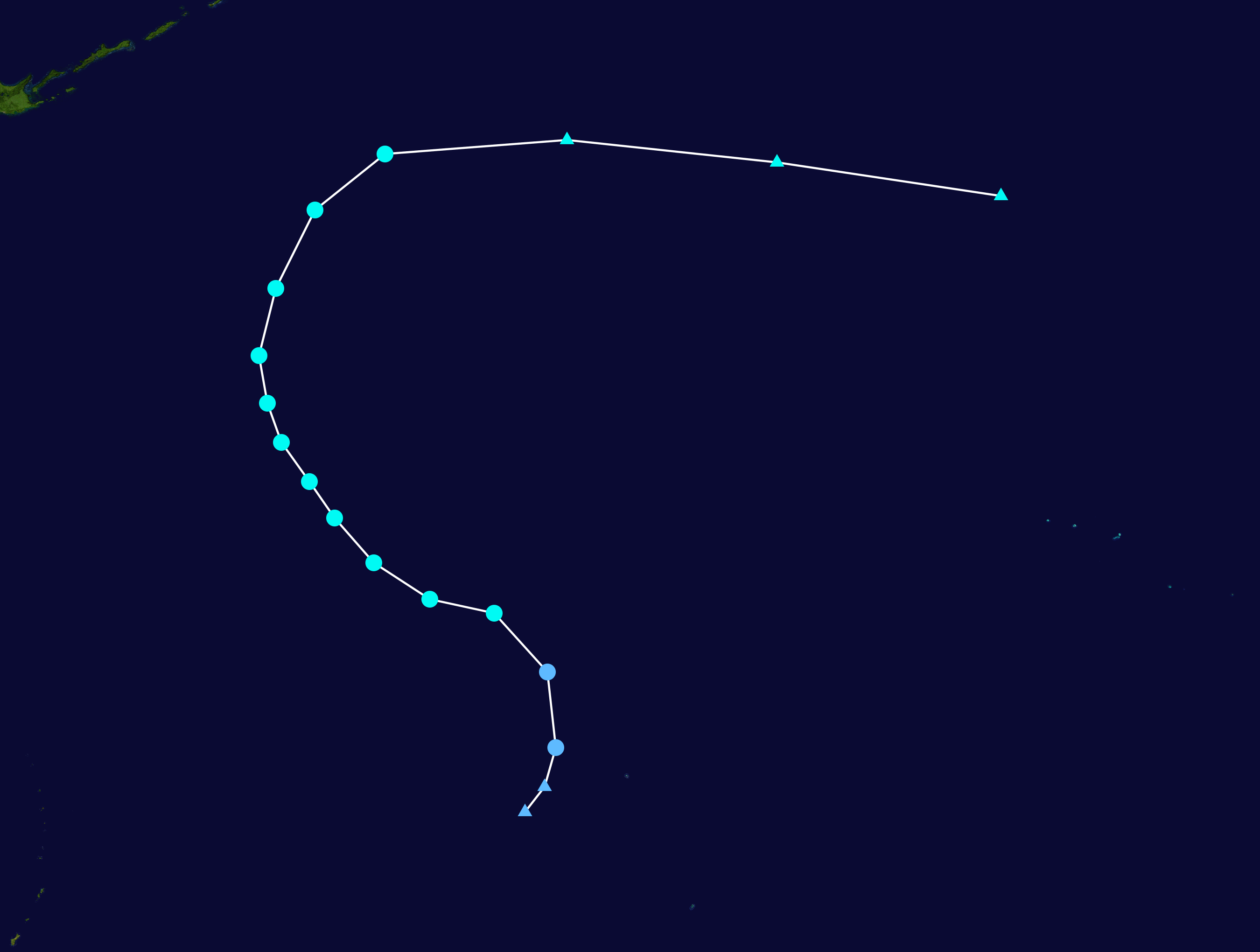
- Duration: September 12 – September 16
- Peak intensity: 85 km/h (50 mph) (1-min); 994 hPa (mbar)

Vera was a tropical storm that stayed out to sea.

=== Super Typhoon Sarah ===
- Typhoon (JMA)
- Category 4 super typhoon (SSHWS)
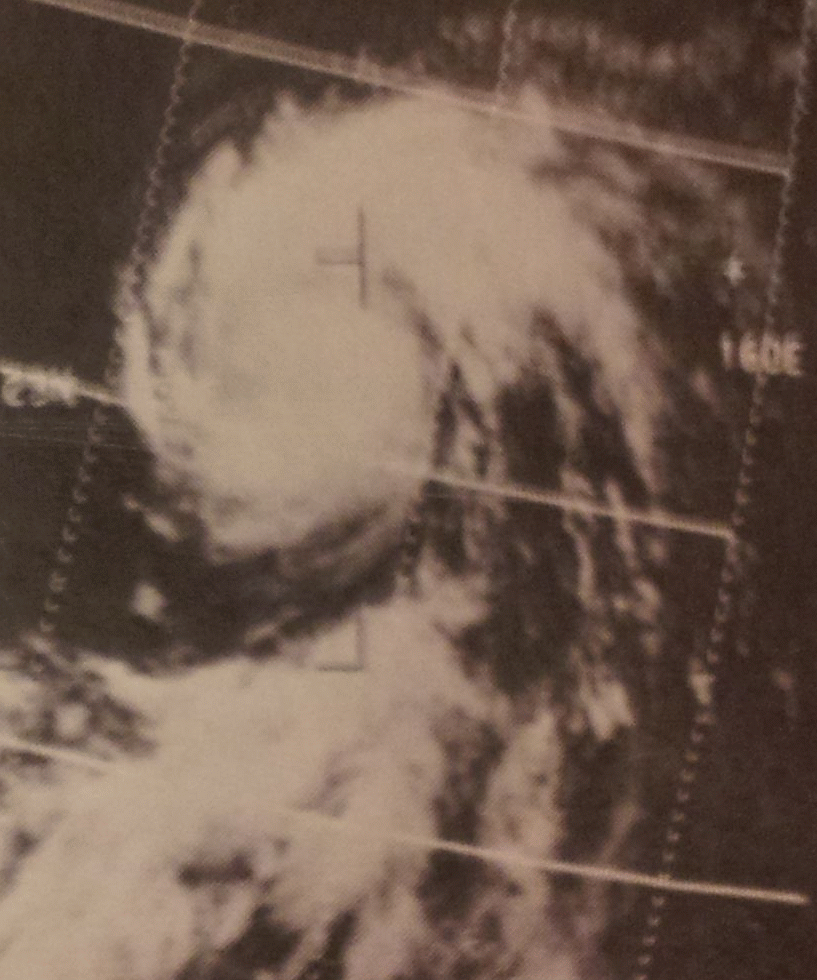
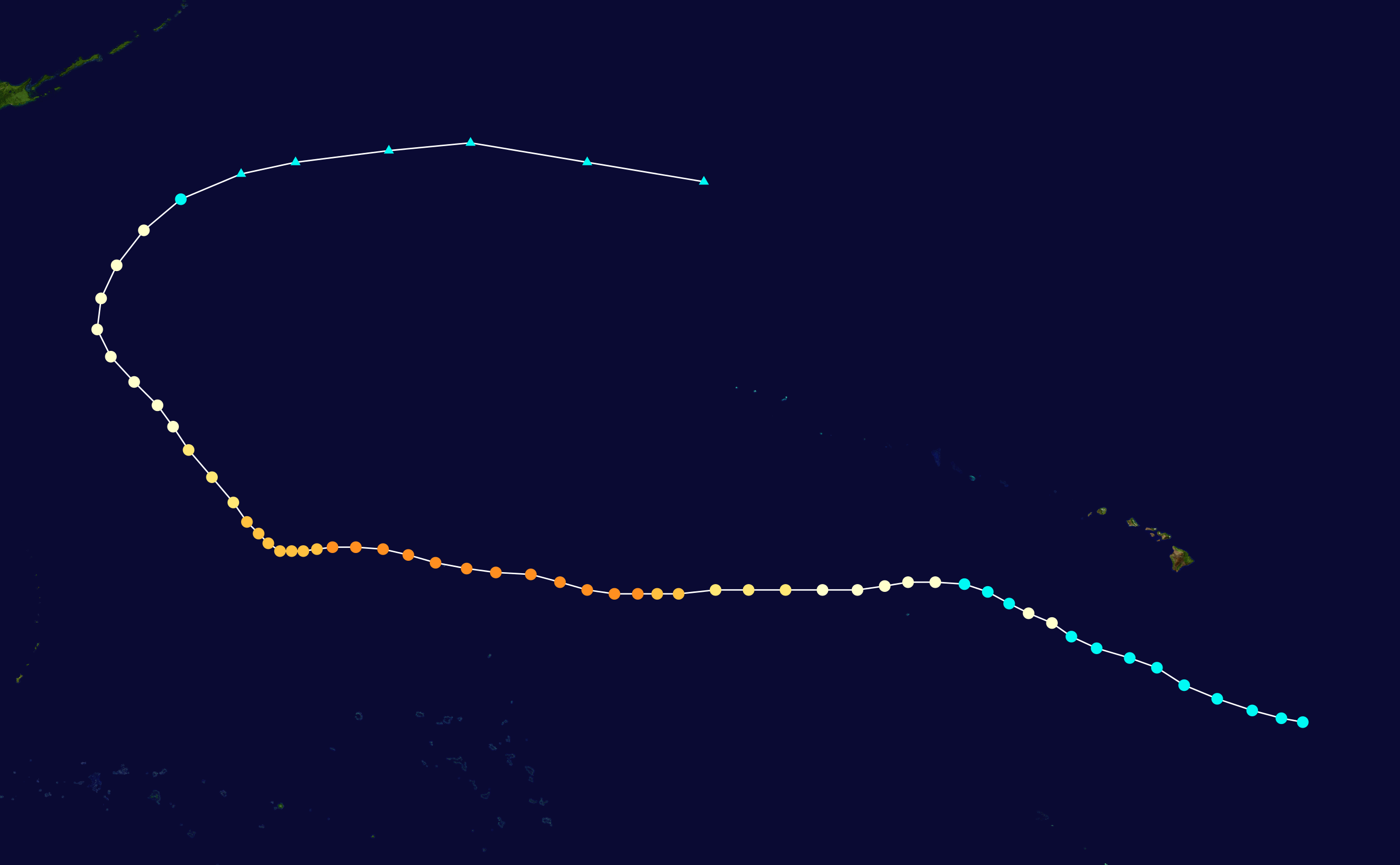
- Duration: September 14 (Entered Basin) – September 22
- Peak intensity: 240 km/h (150 mph) (1-min); 930 hPa (mbar)

On September 14, Hurricane Sarah, which formed across the International Date Line, entered the Western Pacific. Immediately after the first advisory following Sarah's entrance into the West Pacific, it was upgraded to a minimal typhoon. Typhoon Sarah continued to intensify, and late on September 15, it was upgraded to a Category 4 typhoon. The next day, Sarah reached its peak intensity, attaining 150 mph winds and a 932 millibar (mbar) pressure reading (this was the only pressure measurement retrieved from the typhoon), making the system a super typhoon. Sarah began gradually weakening afterwards, and late on September 21, it became extratropical; it was still an 80 mph Category 1 typhoon at the time.

On September 16, Sarah made landfall on Wake Island at peak intensity, causing widespread damage amounting to US$1.5 million. This typhoon was the third tropical cyclone since the beginning of observations in 1935 to bring typhoon-force winds to Wake Island, following an unnamed typhoon which struck on October 19, 1940 (Tomita, 1968), which brought 120 knot winds to the island, and Typhoon Olive in 1952, which lashed the island with 150 knot winds.

=== Typhoon Wanda ===
- Typhoon (JMA)
- Category 2 typhoon (SSHWS)
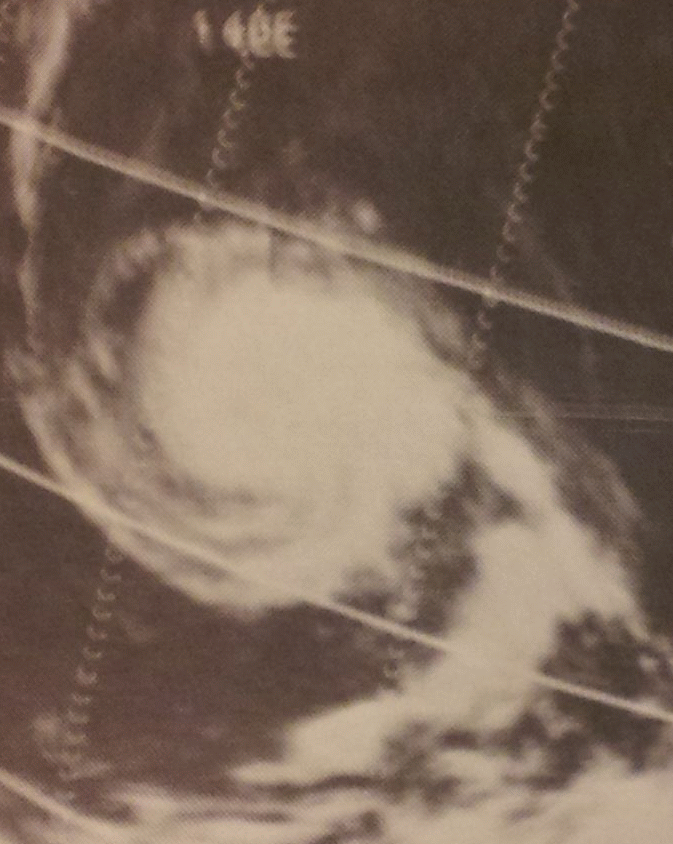
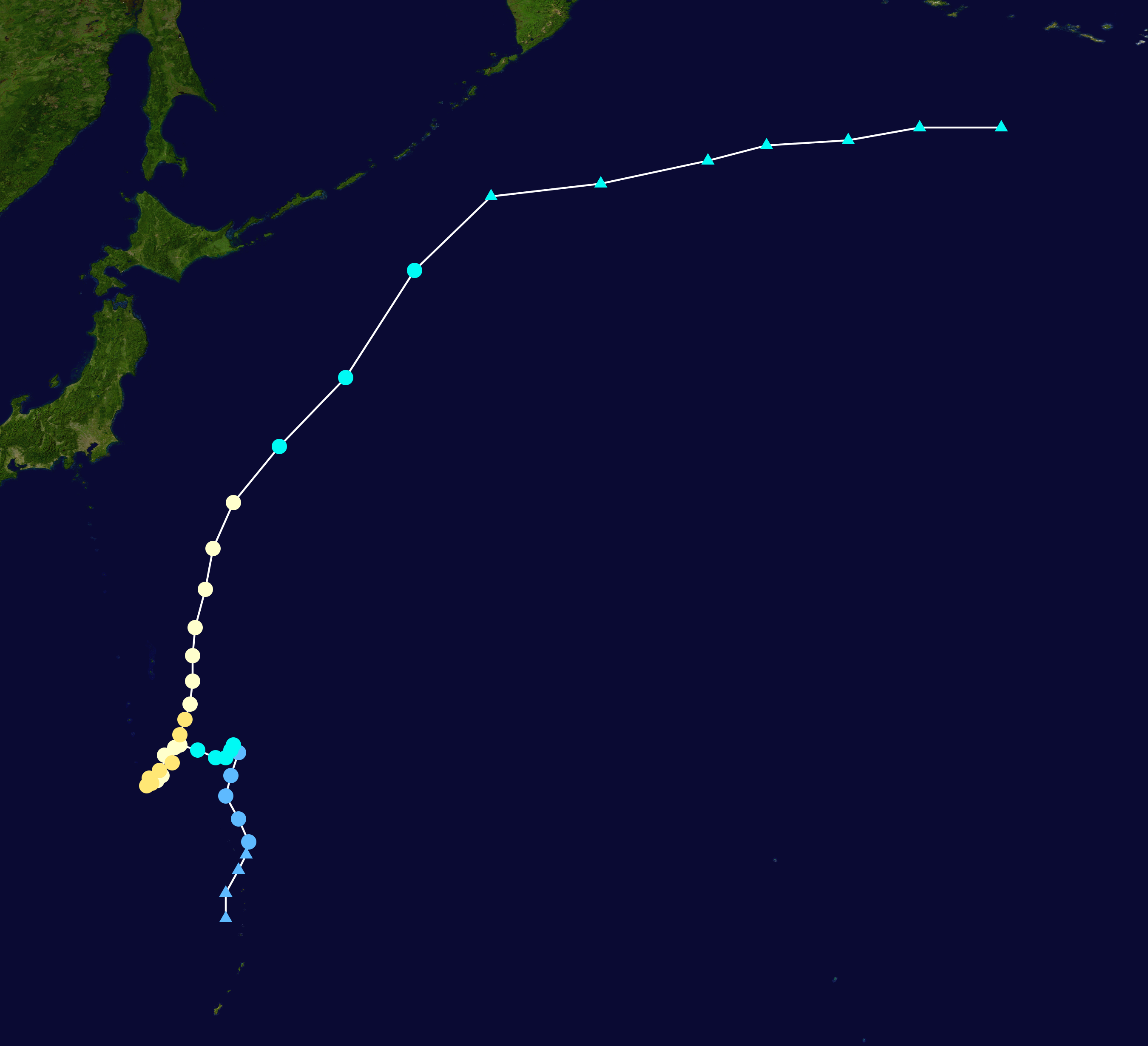
- Duration: September 16 – September 24
- Peak intensity: 175 km/h (110 mph) (1-min); 962 hPa (mbar)

Wanda was a Category 2 typhoon but did not made landfall.

=== JMA Tropical Storm Twenty-nine ===
- Tropical storm (JMA)
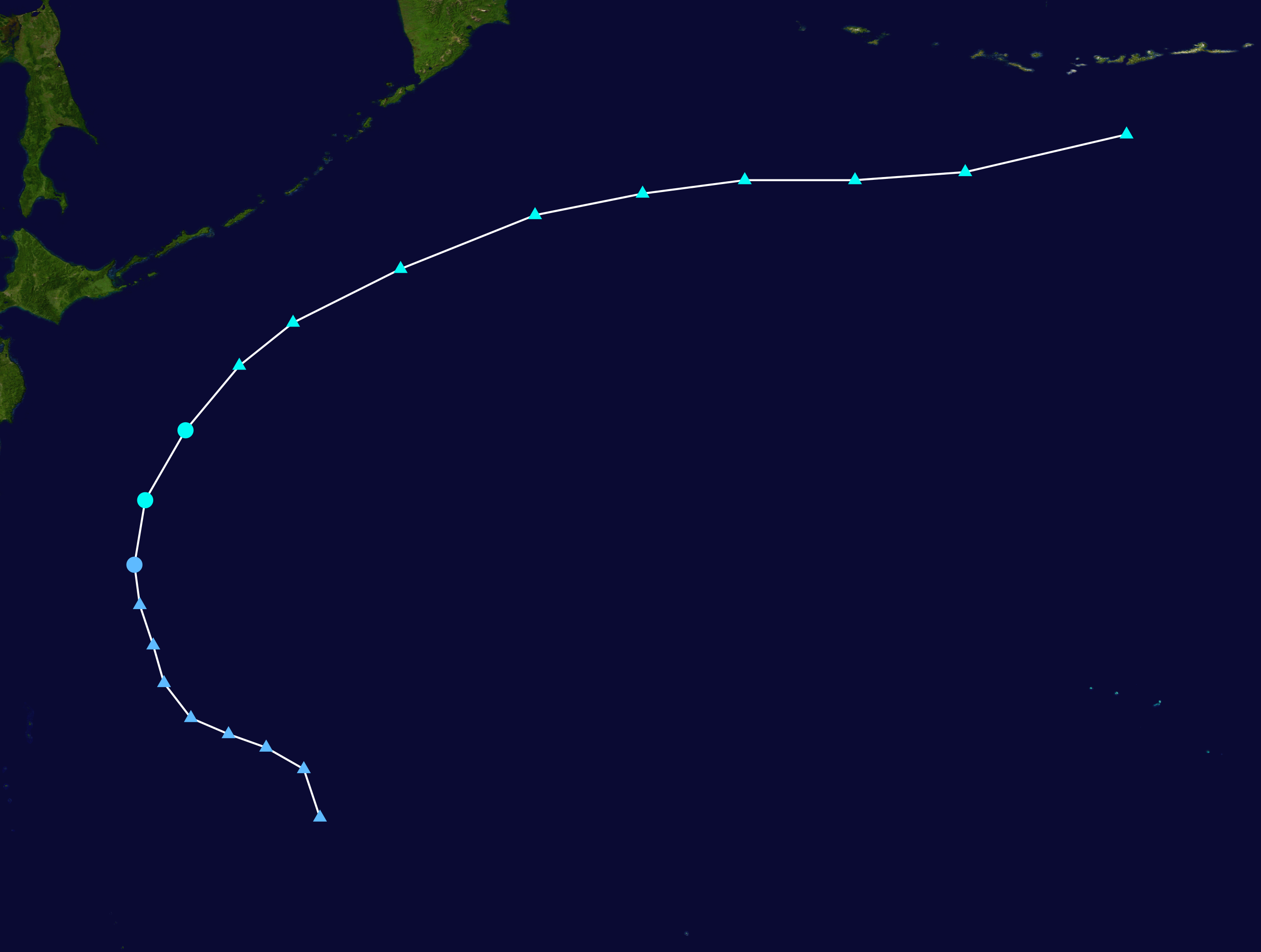
- Duration: September 16 – September 18
- Peak intensity: 85 km/h (50 mph) (10-min); 998 hPa (mbar)

This tropical storm is only recognized by JMA.

=== Typhoon Amy ===
- Typhoon (JMA)
- Category 1 typhoon (SSHWS)
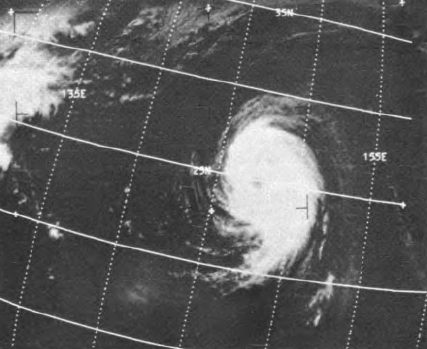
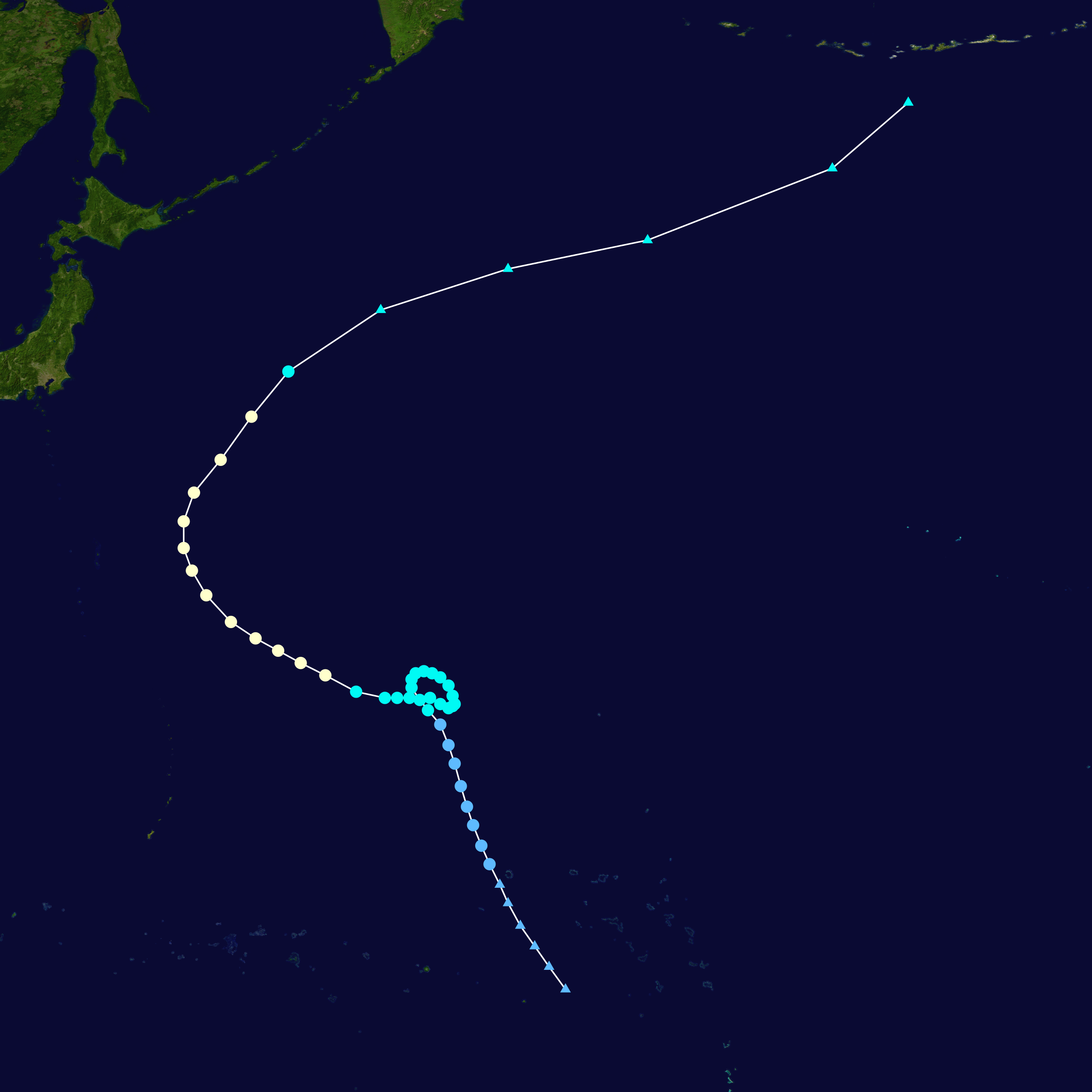
- Duration: September 24 – October 6
- Peak intensity: 150 km/h (90 mph) (1-min); 962 hPa (mbar)

Amy was a Category 1 typhoon.

=== JMA Tropical Storm Thirty-one ===
- Tropical storm (JMA)
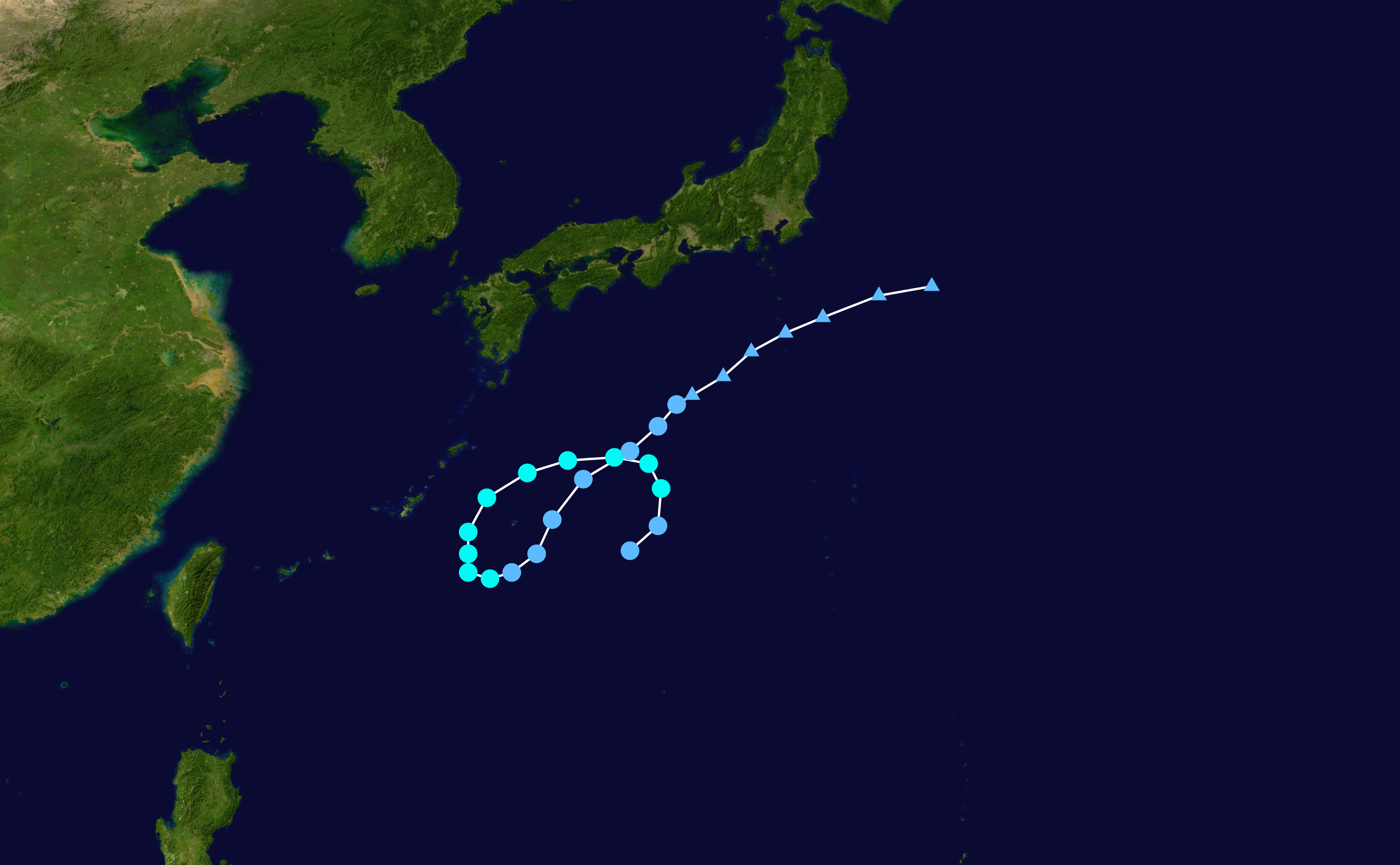
- Duration: September 28 – October 1
- Peak intensity: 85 km/h (50 mph) (10-min); 992 hPa (mbar)

This system is only tracked by JMA.

=== Tropical Depression 34W ===
- Tropical depression (JMA)
- Tropical depression (SSHWS)
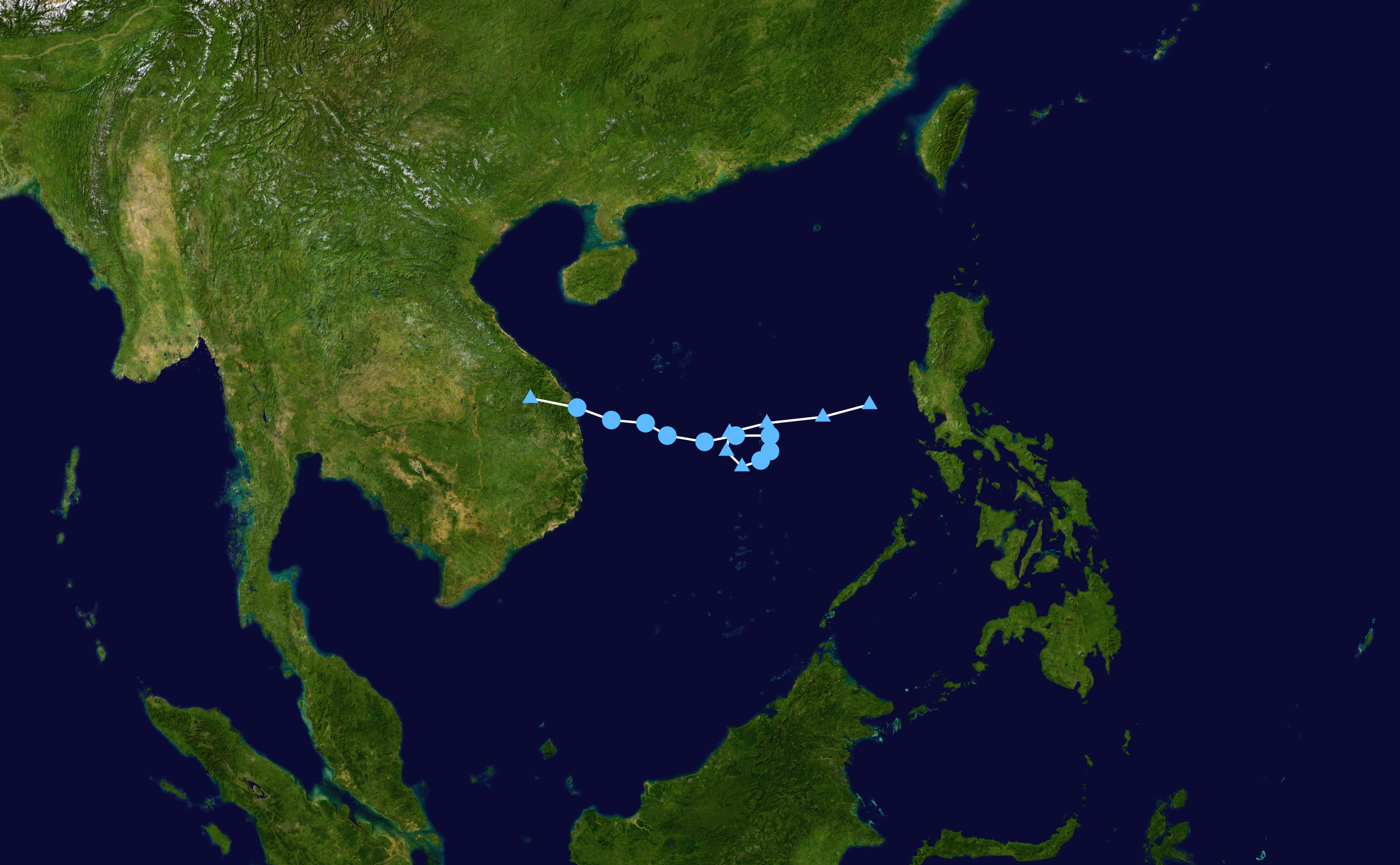
- Duration: October 6 – October 9
- Peak intensity: 55 km/h (35 mph) (1-min); 1004 hPa (mbar)

34W was a short-lived tropical depression.

=== Tropical Storm Babe ===
- Severe tropical storm (JMA)
- Tropical storm (SSHWS)
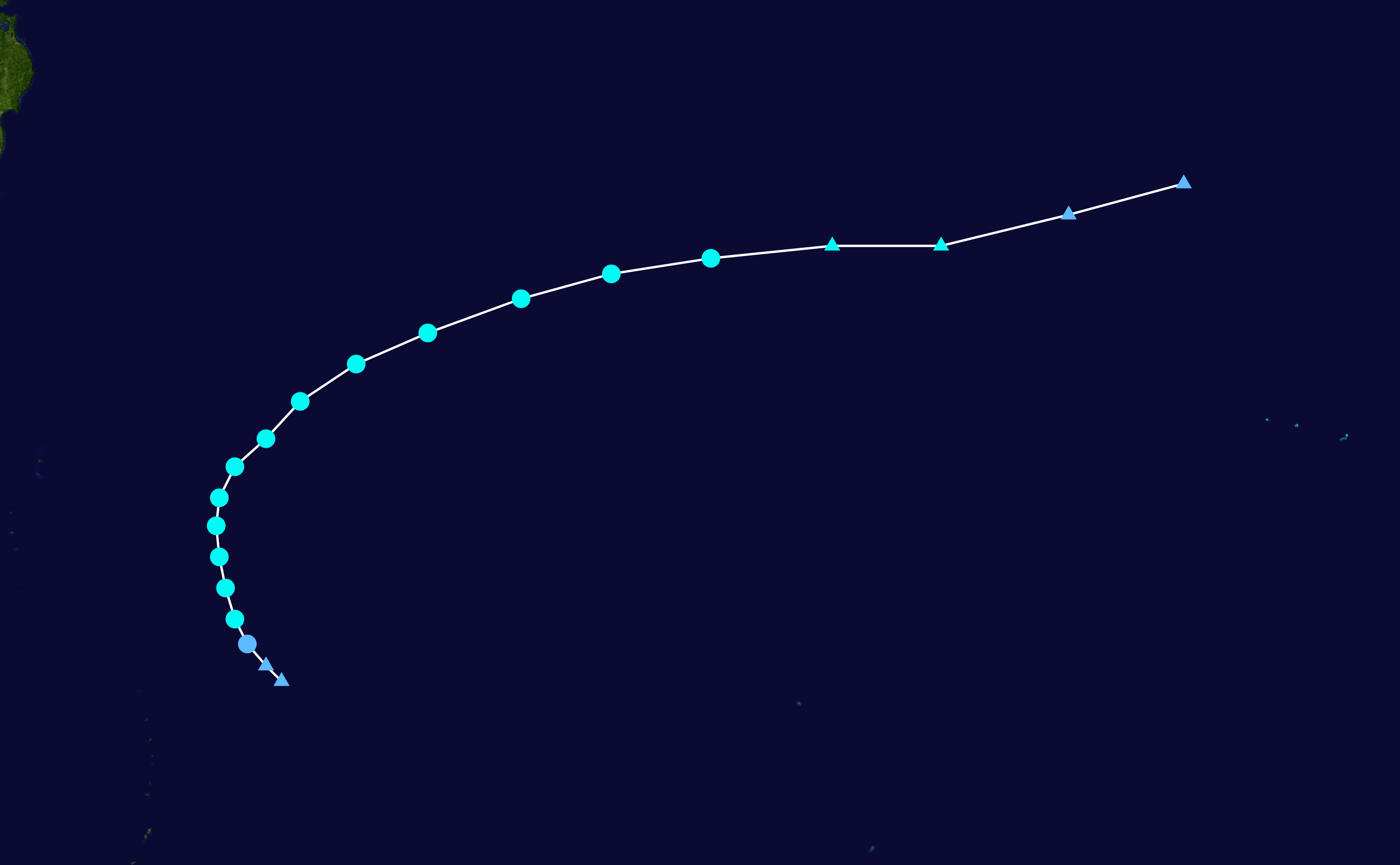
- Duration: October 6 – October 10
- Peak intensity: 110 km/h (70 mph) (1-min); 980 hPa (mbar)

Babe was a tropical storm that did not make landfall.

=== Super Typhoon Carla (Trining) ===
- Typhoon (JMA)
- Category 5 super typhoon (SSHWS)
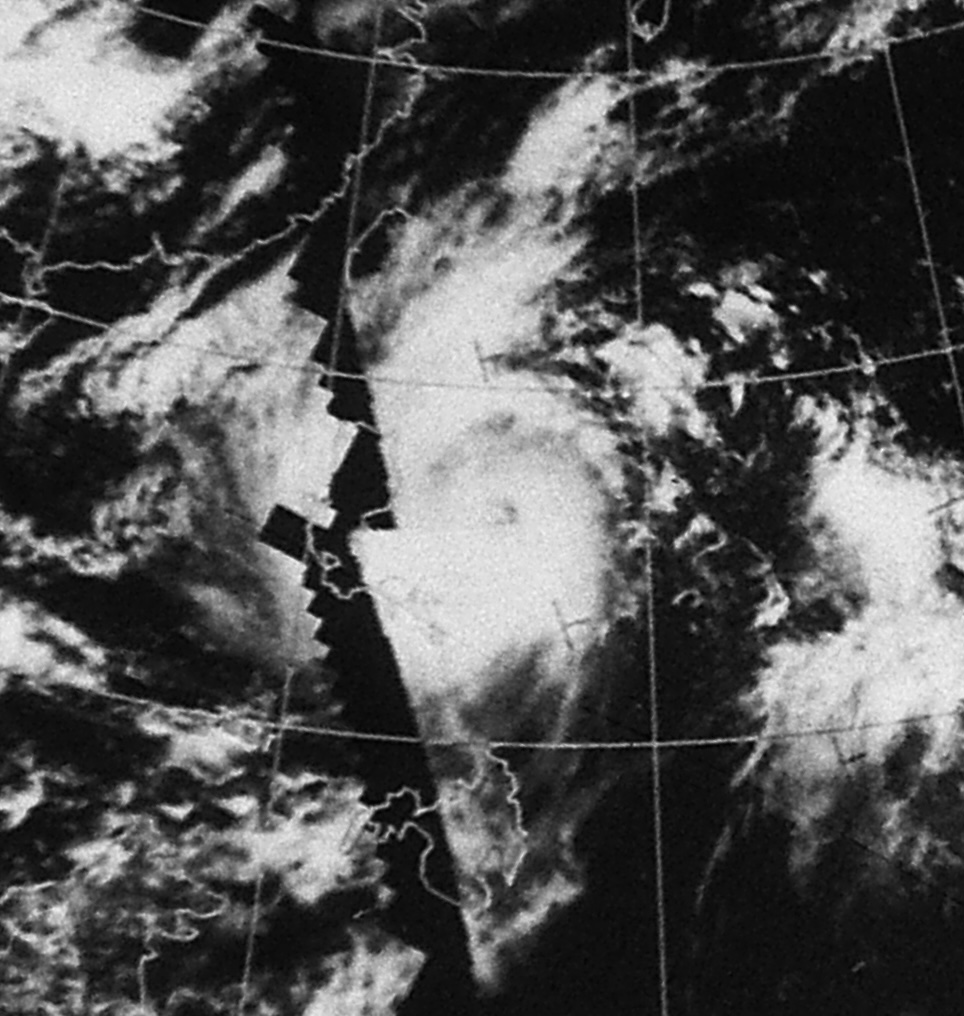
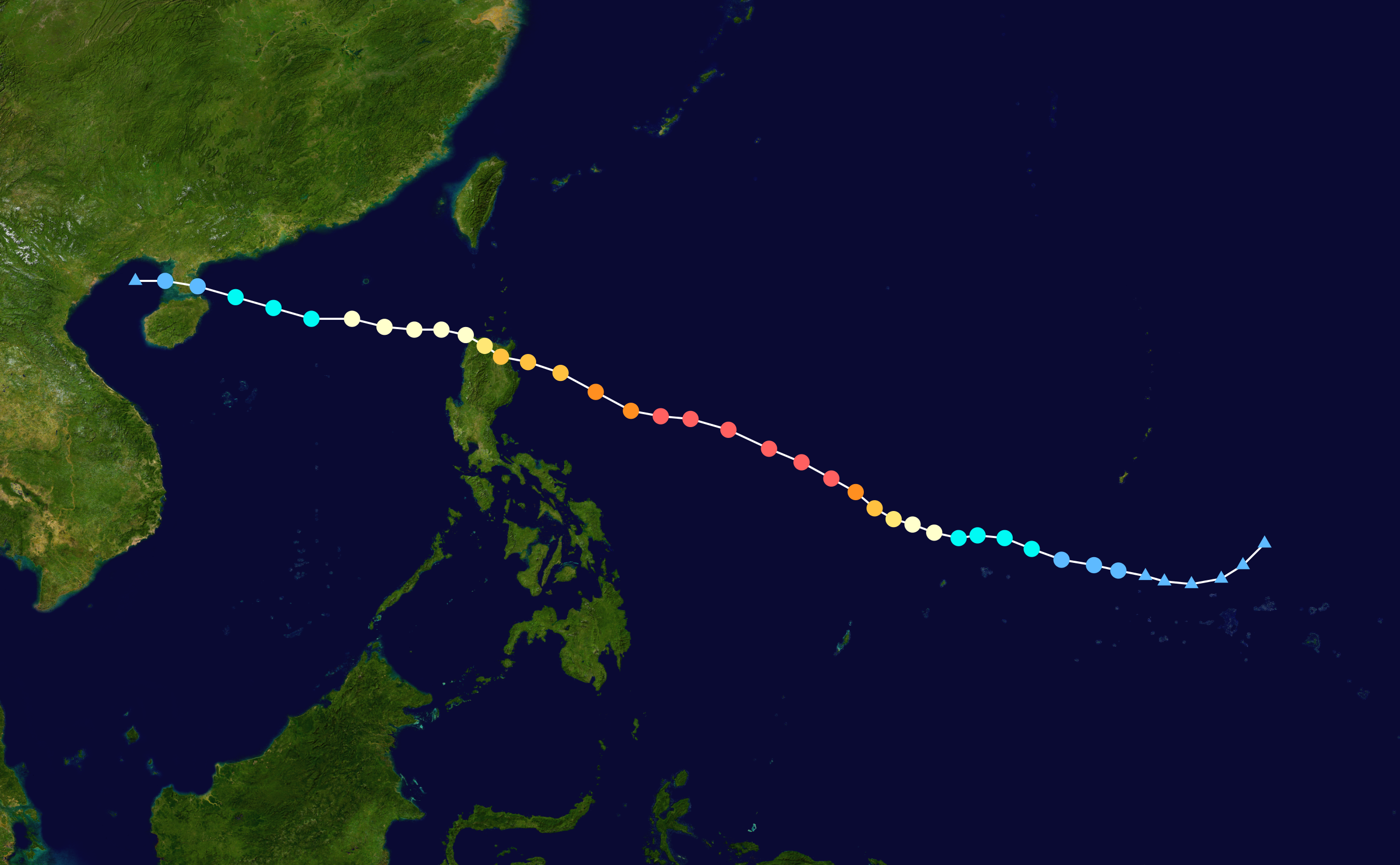
- Duration: October 10 – October 20
- Peak intensity: 295 km/h (185 mph) (1-min); 900 hPa (mbar)

Carla became an intense typhoon while located in the Philippine Sea on October 15. During its weakening stage, the typhoon dumped extreme rainfall around its circulation. Baguio, Philippines recorded 47.86 inches (1,216 mm) of rainfall in a 24‑hour period between October 17 and October 18; however, Carla's precipitation was significantly more extreme in Taiwan, where 108.21 inches (2,749 mm) fell in a 48‑hour period between October 17 and October 19. The worst typhoon to hit the country during the year, it killed 250 people and left 30 others missing.

=== Typhoon Dinah (Uring) ===
- Typhoon (JMA)
- Category 3 typhoon (SSHWS)
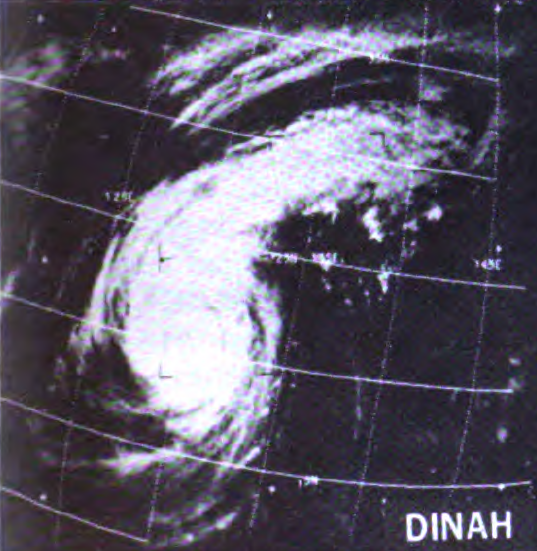
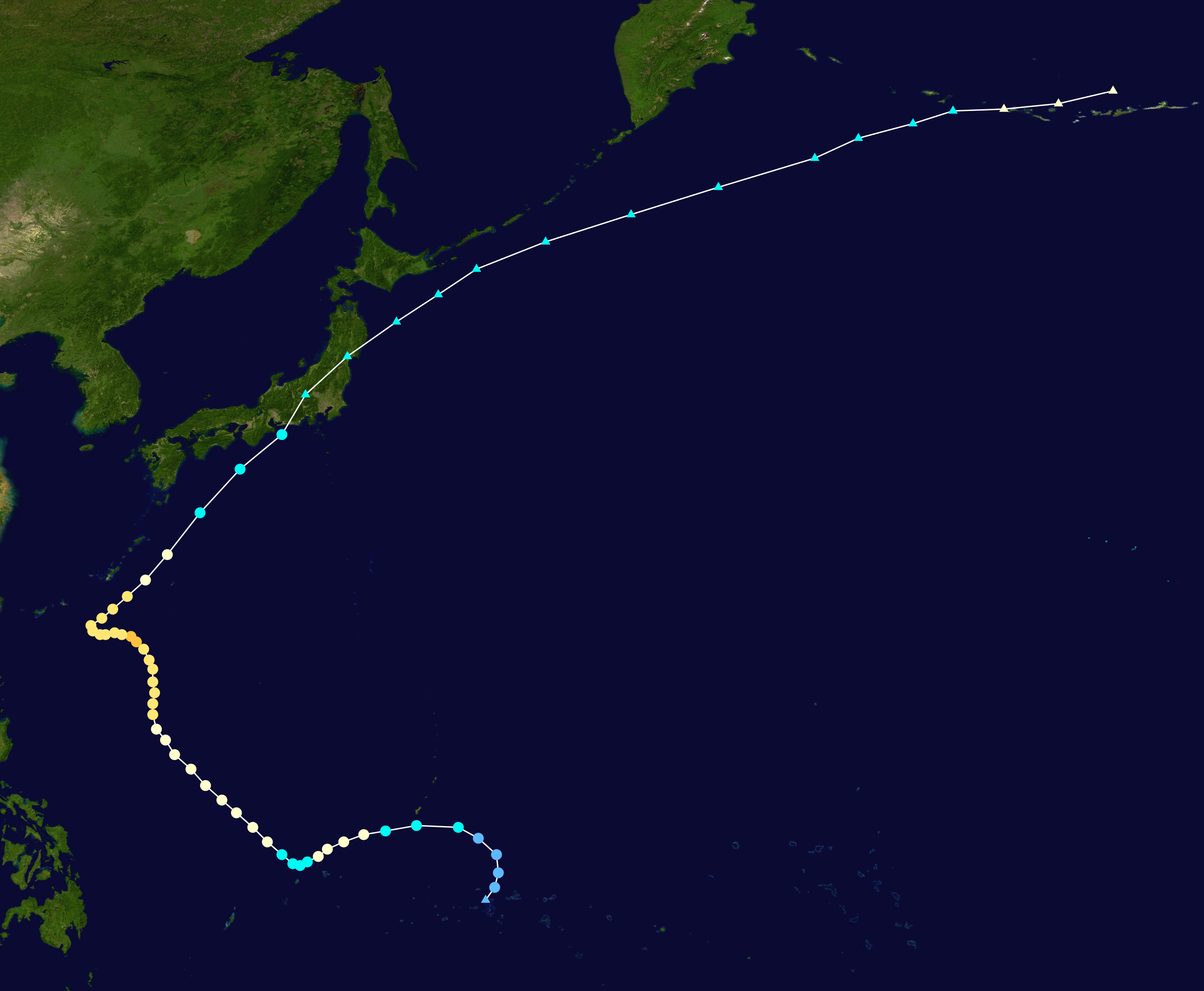
- Duration: October 16 – October 27
- Peak intensity: 185 km/h (115 mph) (1-min); 950 hPa (mbar)

Typhoon Dinah struck the southern island of Kyūshū in Japan, killing thirty-seven people and resulting in ten others being reported as missing.

=== Super Typhoon Emma (Welming) ===
- Typhoon (JMA)
- Category 5 super typhoon (SSHWS)
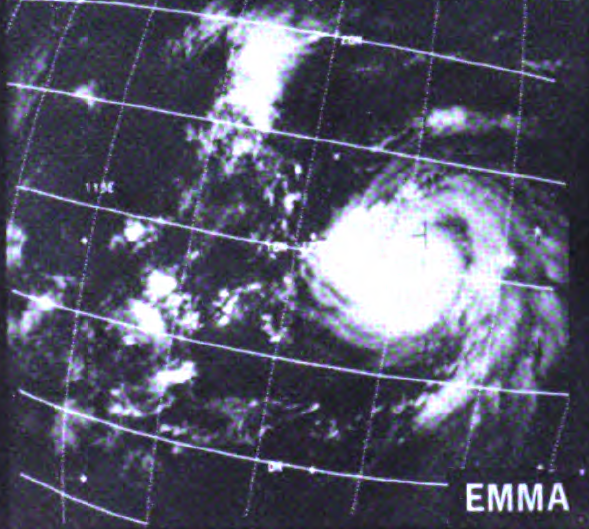
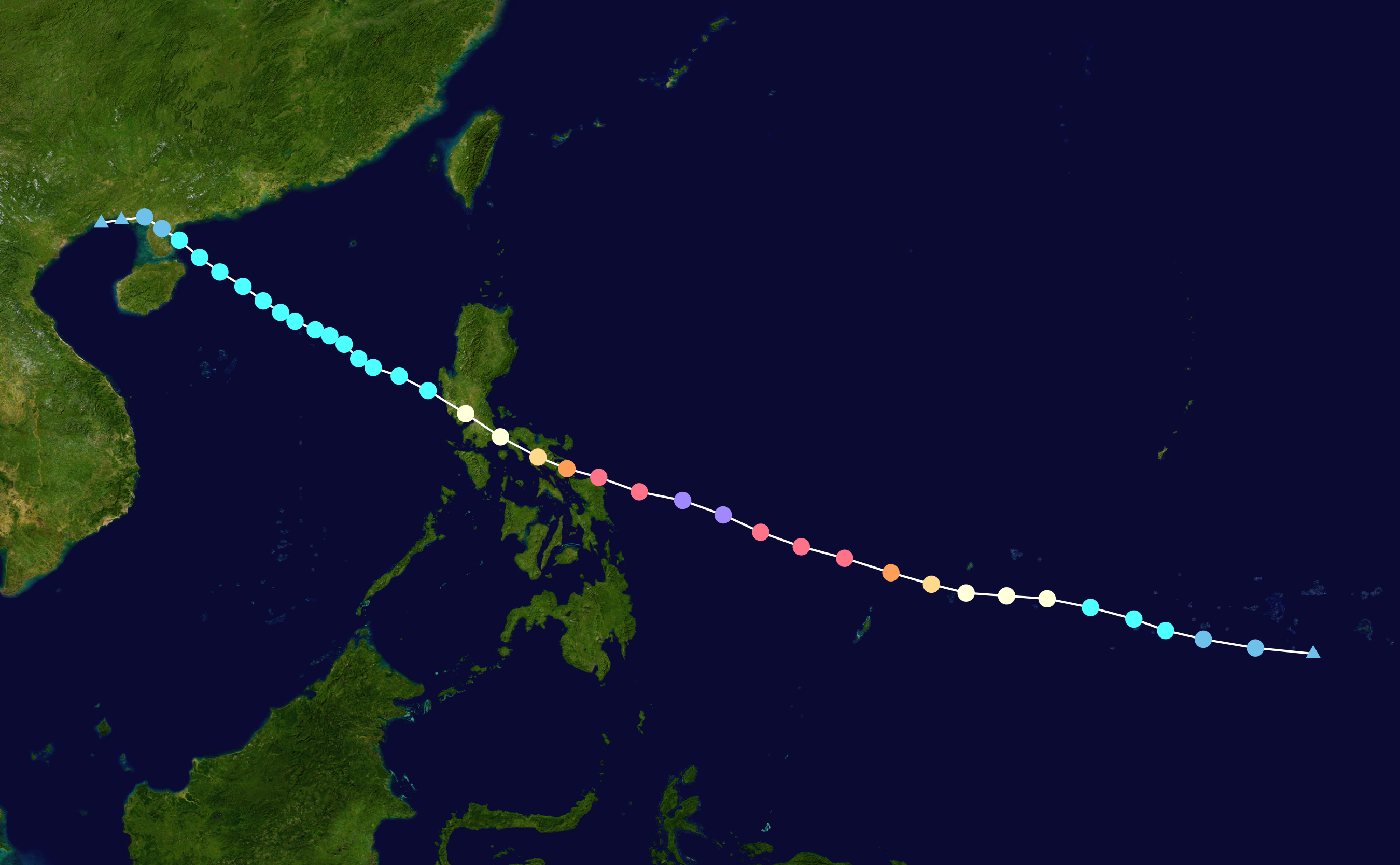
- Duration: October 31 – November 8
- Peak intensity: 260 km/h (160 mph) (1-min); 908 hPa (mbar)

Typhoon Emma was the second super Typhoon to hit the Philippines just 2 weeks after Typhoon Carla. Typhoon Emma left 300 people dead and 60 others missing.

=== Typhoon Freda (Yayang) ===
- Typhoon (JMA)
- Category 2 typhoon (SSHWS)
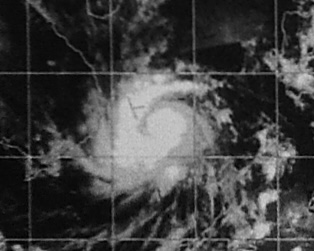
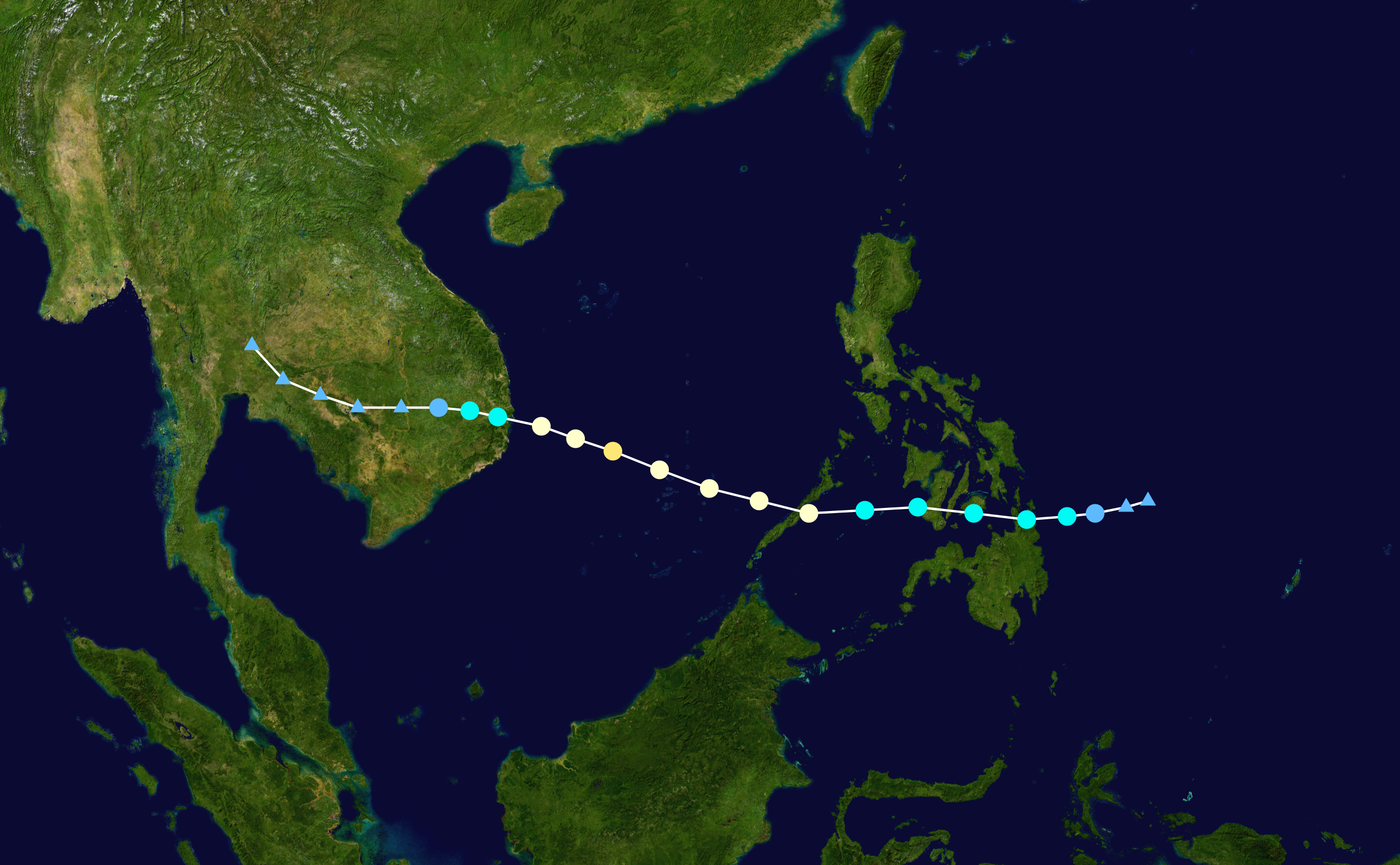
- Duration: November 6 – November 11
- Peak intensity: 155 km/h (100 mph) (1-min); 972 hPa (mbar)

Freda formed east of the Philippines on November 6. It made landfall in the Philippines as a tropical storm. As it moved into the South China Sea, Freda developed into a Category 1 typhoon and made landfall in Vietnam. The storm dissipated inland on November 11.

=== Super Typhoon Gilda (Ading) ===
- Typhoon (JMA)
- Category 4 super typhoon (SSHWS)
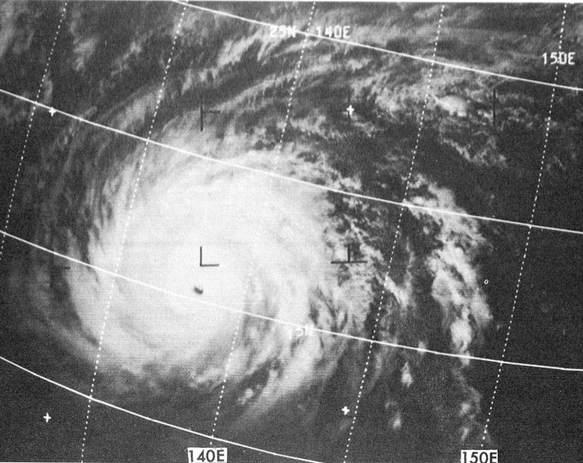
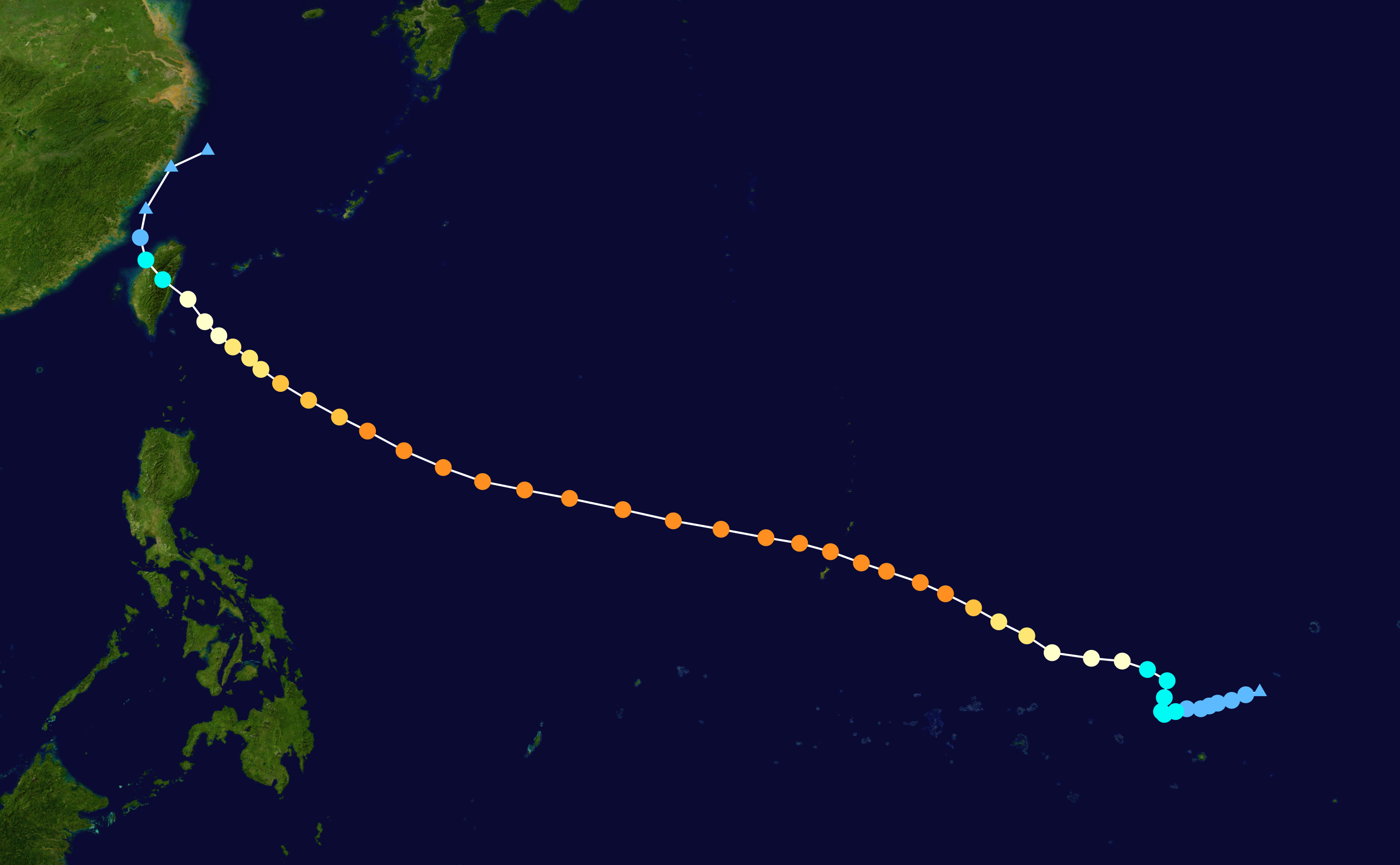
- Duration: November 7 – November 19
- Peak intensity: 240 km/h (150 mph) (1-min); 910 hPa (mbar)

On November 7 a tropical depression formed near the Mariana Islands. It intensifed into typhoon status three days later. Gilda reached peak intensity on November 14, with 130kt wind and lowest central pressure of 896 hPa (mbar). Gilda weakened and made landfall as a Category 1 typhoon before dissipating on November 19 southeast of Shanghai.

=== Typhoon Harriet ===
- Typhoon (JMA)
- Category 3 typhoon (SSHWS)
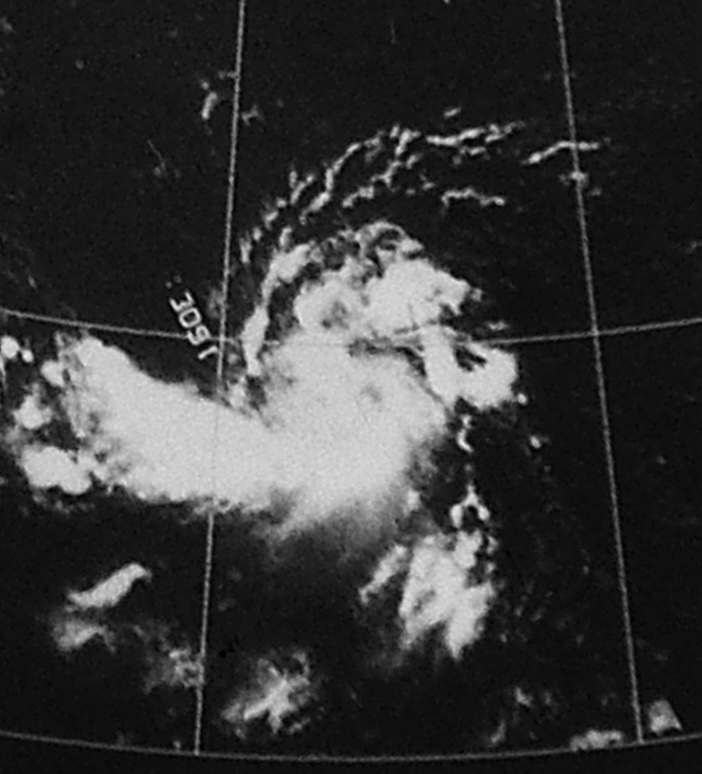
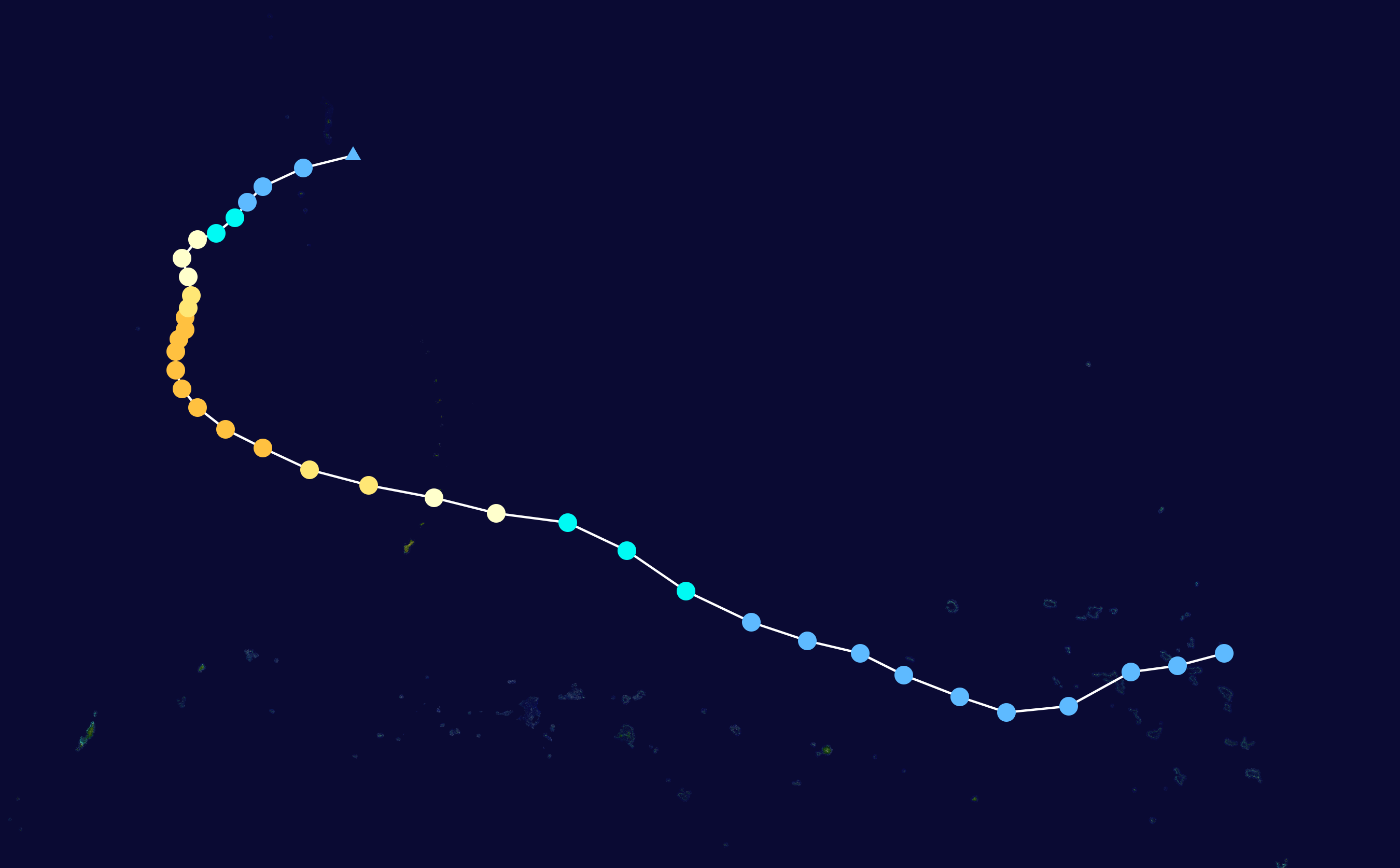
- Duration: November 15 – November 24
- Peak intensity: 205 km/h (125 mph) (1-min); 950 hPa (mbar)

Harriet was a Category 3 typhoon that stayed in the ocean.

=== Tropical Storm Ivy (Barang) ===
- Severe tropical storm (JMA)
- Tropical storm (SSHWS)
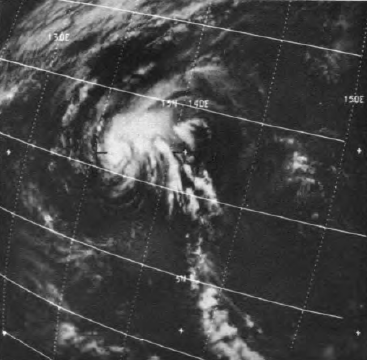
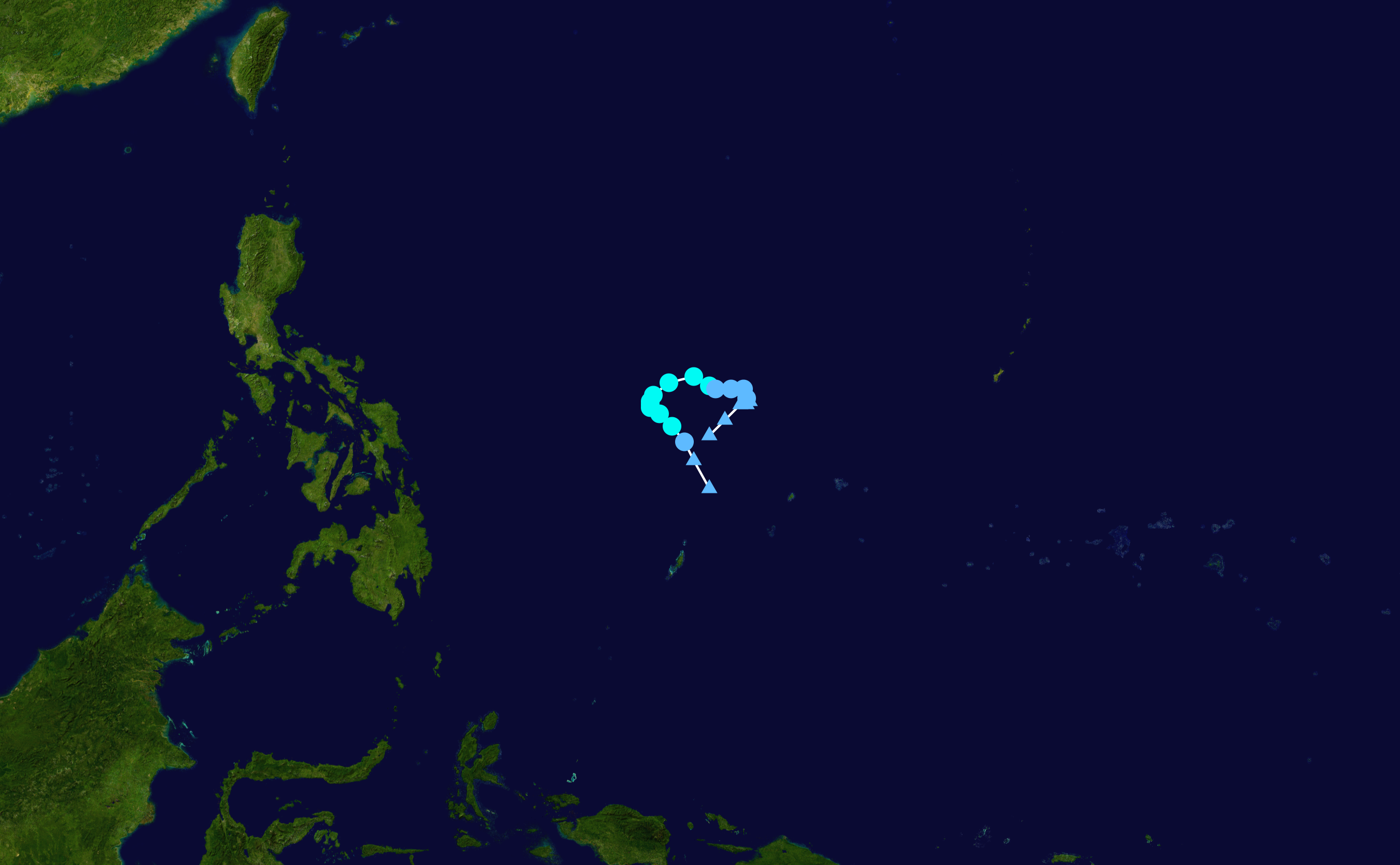
- Duration: December 16 – December 21
- Peak intensity: 110 km/h (70 mph) (1-min); 980 hPa (mbar)

Ivy was a short-lived tropical storm and dissipated east of the Philippines.

== Storm names ==
=== International names ===
During the season, 35 named tropical cyclones developed in the Western Pacific and were named by the Joint Typhoon Warning Center. The names were drawn sequentially from a set of four alphabetical naming lists and were all feminine.

Ruby	Sally	Therese	Violet	Wilda	Anita	Billie	Clara	Dot	Ellen	Fran	Georgia
Hope	Iris	Joan	Kate	Louise	Marge	Nora	Opal	Patsy	Ruth	Sarah	Thelma
Vera	Wanda	Amy	Babe	Carla	Dinah	Emma	Freda	Gilda	Harriet	Ivy	

=== Philippines ===
Auring	Bebeng	Karing	Diding	Etang
Gening	Herming	Ising	Luding	Mameng
Neneng	Oniang	Pepang	Rosing	Sisang
Trining	Uring	Welming	Yayang	
Auxiliary list
				Ading
Barang	Krising (unused)	Dadang (unused)	Erling (unused)	Goying (unused)

The Philippine Weather Bureau – the predecessor of the Philippine Atmospheric, Geophysical and Astronomical Services Administration or PAGASA – uses its own naming scheme for tropical cyclones in their area of responsibility. The agency assigns names to tropical depressions that form within their area of responsibility and any tropical cyclone that might move into their area of responsibility. Should the list of names for a given year prove to be insufficient, names are taken from an auxiliary list, the first 6 of which are published each year before the season starts. The names not retired from this list will be used again in the 1971 season. This is the same list used for the 1963 season. The names Uring, Welming, Yayang, Ading and Barang used the first (and only, in the case of Welming) time this year. The PWB uses its own naming scheme that starts in the Filipino alphabet, with names of Filipino female names ending with "ng" (A, B, K, D, etc.). Names that were not assigned/going to use are marked in gray.

=== Retirement ===
Due to an extreme death toll caused by Typhoon Emma (Welming) in the Philippines, PAGASA later retired the name Welming and was replaced by Warling for the 1971 season.

== See also ==
- 1967 Atlantic hurricane season
- 1967 Pacific hurricane season
- List of wettest tropical cyclones
- Australian cyclone seasons: 1966–67, 1967–68
- South Pacific cyclone seasons: 1966–67, 1967–68
- South-West Indian Ocean cyclone seasons: 1966–67, 1967–68
