= 1963 Pacific typhoon season =

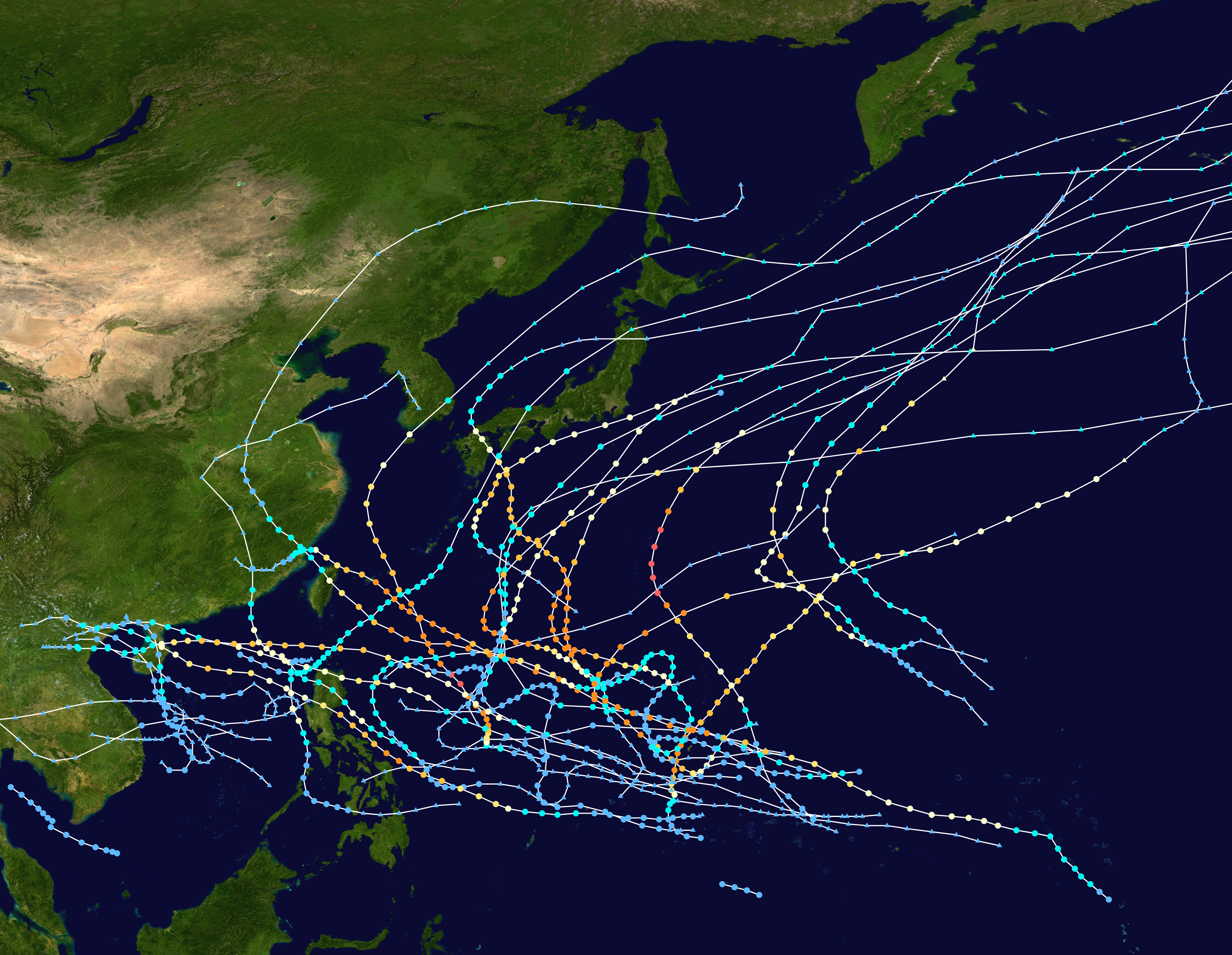
- Season summary map

Seasonal boundaries
- First system formed: March 25, 1963
- Last system dissipated: December 28, 1963

Strongest storm
- Name: Judy
  - Maximum winds: 280 km/h (175 mph) (1-minute sustained)
  - Lowest pressure: 920 hPa (mbar)

Seasonal statistics
- Total depressions: 36
- Total storms: 25
- Typhoons: 19
- Very strong typhoons: 8 (unofficial)
- Total fatalities: Unknown
- Total damage: Unknown

Related articles
- 1963 Atlantic hurricane season; 1963 Pacific hurricane season; 1963 North Indian Ocean cyclone season

The 1963 Pacific typhoon season has no official bounds; it ran year-round in 1963, but most tropical cyclones tend to form in the northwestern Pacific Ocean between June and December. These dates conventionally delimit the period of each year when most tropical cyclones form in the northwestern Pacific Ocean.

The scope of this article is limited to the Pacific Ocean, north of the equator and west of the International Date Line. Storms that form east of the date line and north of the equator are called hurricanes; see 1963 Pacific hurricane season. Tropical Storms formed in the entire west pacific basin were assigned a name by the Joint Typhoon Warning Center. Tropical depressions in this basin have the "W" suffix added to their number. This is also the first season in which the Philippine Weather Bureau (which became the Philippine Atmospheric, Geophysical and Astronomical Services Administration or PAGASA in 1972) assigned local names to tropical depressions that enter or form in the Philippine area of responsibility. This can often result in the same storm having two names.

== Seasonal summary ==
Timeline of tropical activity in the 1963 Pacific typhoon season

== Systems ==
36 tropical depressions formed this year in the Western Pacific, of which 25 became tropical storms. 19 storms reached typhoon intensity, of which 8 reached super typhoon strength.

=== Tropical Depression 03W ===
- Tropical depression (SSHWS)
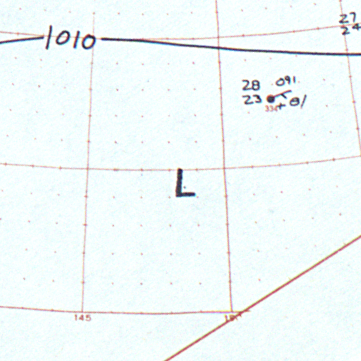
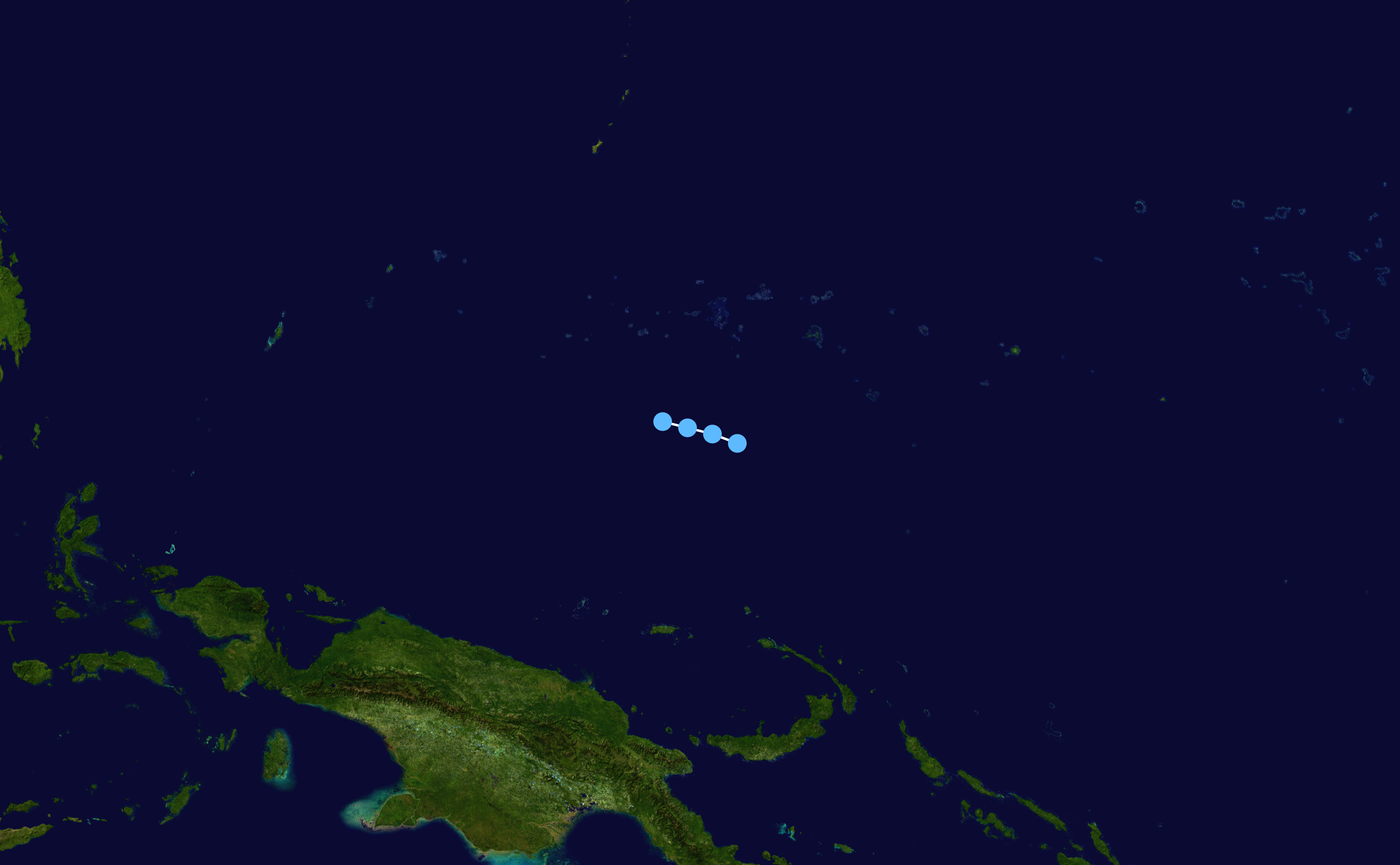
- Duration: March 25 – March 25
- Peak intensity: 55 km/h (35 mph) (1-min);

A brief tropical depression developed north of Papua New Guinea at 00:00 UTC on March 25, and tracked west-northwest before it dissipated later that day. Although the Joint Typhoon Warning Center does not list any maximum sustained wind values in its tracking data, the Mariners Weather Log notes that Tropical Depression 03W briefly attained winds of 55 km/h (35 mph) at its peak before dissipating.

=== CMA Tropical Depression 1 ===
- Tropical depression (JMA)
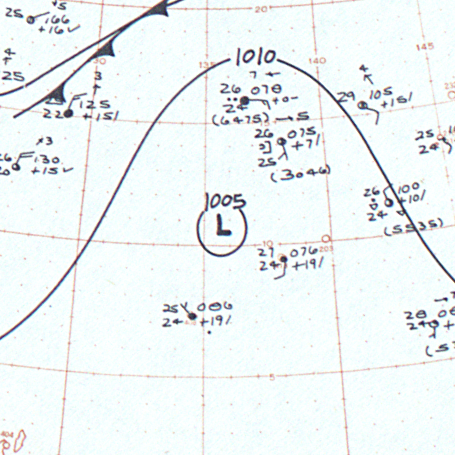
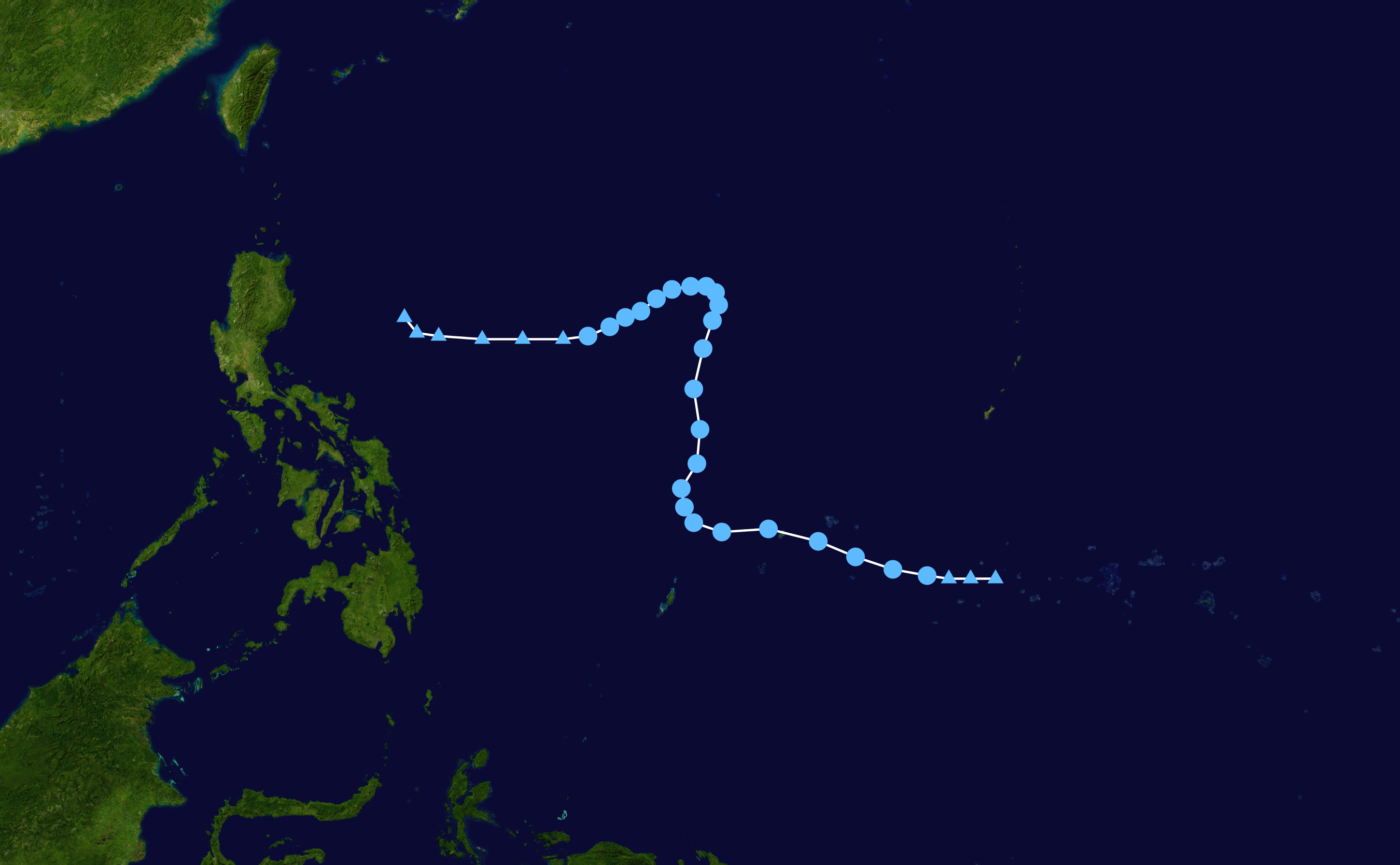
- Duration: March 31 – April 6
- Peak intensity: 55 km/h (35 mph) (10-min); 1001 hPa (mbar)

The China Meteorological Administration (CMA) analyzed the formation of a disturbance near Micronesia on March 30, though no other agencies monitored the system. Tracking westward, the low-pressure area developed further into a tropical depression the following day. The storm turned towards the north on April 1, reaching peak intensity two days later with winds of 55 km/h and a minimum pressure of 1001 mbar (hPa; 29.56 inHg) before slowly weakening. On April 6, the depression degenerated into a remnant area of low pressure; these remnants tracked westward before dissipating early the next day.

=== Typhoon Olive ===
- Typhoon (JMA)
- Category 4-equivalent typhoon (SSHWS)
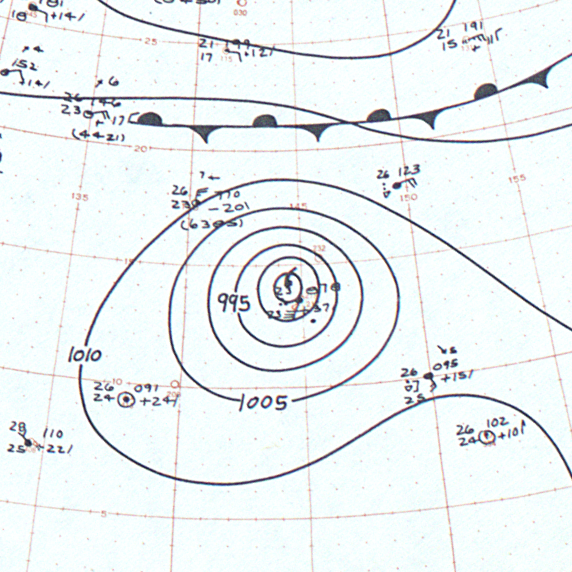
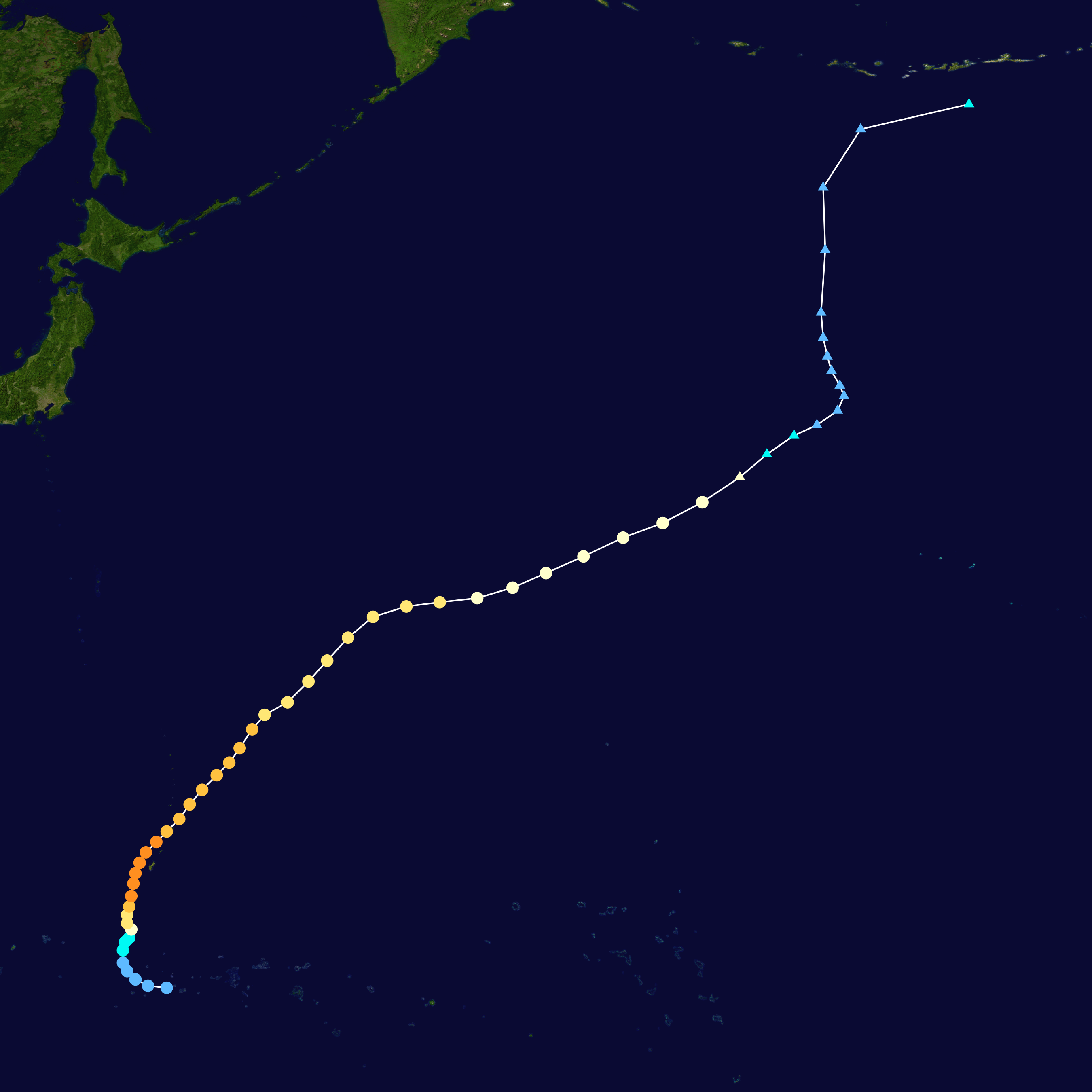
- Duration: April 26 – May 5
- Peak intensity: 230 km/h (145 mph) (1-min); 920 hPa (mbar)

The low-pressure area that eventually developed into Typhoon Olive first formed approximately 155 km (96 mi) southeast of Truk on April 21, embedded within the larger context of a trough. In its nascent stages, the disturbance tracked slowly west-northwestward toward Woleai; the Japan Meteorological Agency (JMA) considers the storm to have developed into a tropical depression on April 26, though the JTWC began monitoring Olive as a 75 km/h (45 mph) tropical storm the day after. Olive quickly intensified following tropical cyclogenesis, becoming a typhoon by 12:00 UTC on April 27. Late on April 28, a reconnaissance mission sampled winds of 230 km/h (145 mph) and a minimum barometric pressure of 932 mbar (hPa; 27.52 inHg); from these parameters Olive reached peak intensity at 00:00 UTC on April 29 with a minimum pressure of 920 mbar as computed by the JMA. Olive passed near Guam and Saipan later that day, impacting the latter with winds of 205 km/h (125 mph). As the typhoon receded to more northerly latitudes, it slowly weakened, transitioning into an extratropical cyclone on May 5 before dissipating four days later; maintaining typhoon strength for 8.5 days, Olive remained a typhoon longer than any other storm in 1963.

As Olive neared Guam, then-governor Manuel Guerrero ordered the evacuation of low-lying areas and the opening of shelters at schools, churches, and other locations. Olive caused considerable damage in the Mariana Islands: 95 percent of homes on Saipan sustained extensive damage, with another 5 percent destroyed by the storm. Homes were also damaged on nearby Rota, with the widespread loss of crops; property and agricultural losses were also accrued on Guam and Tinian, where power lines were downed by strong winds and 1,000 people were left homeless. The effects of the typhoon set back Guam's recovery from Typhoon Karen the previous year, damaging homes partially repaired via recovery loans for Karen. Estimated damage from Olive amounted to US$5 million. In the storm's aftermath, deputy high commissioner for the Trust Territory of the Pacific Islands Jose Benitez requested the declaration of Tinian and Saipan as disaster areas. On April 30, then-U.S. President John F. Kennedy acknowledged Benitez's request and declared a disaster area for the impacted islands. Kennedy would later allocate US$1.3 million for storm relief in Saipan, Tinian, and Rota. Food and medical supplies were sent from the Caroline and Marshall Islands to the Mariana Islands.

=== Typhoon Polly (Auring) ===
- Typhoon (JMA)
- Category 1-equivalent typhoon (SSHWS)
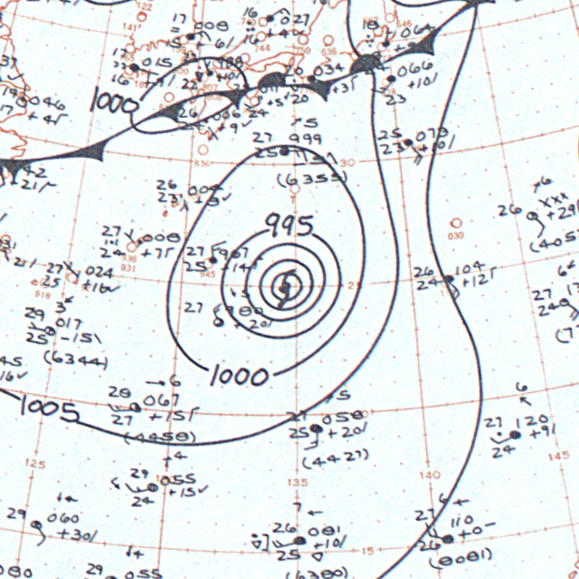
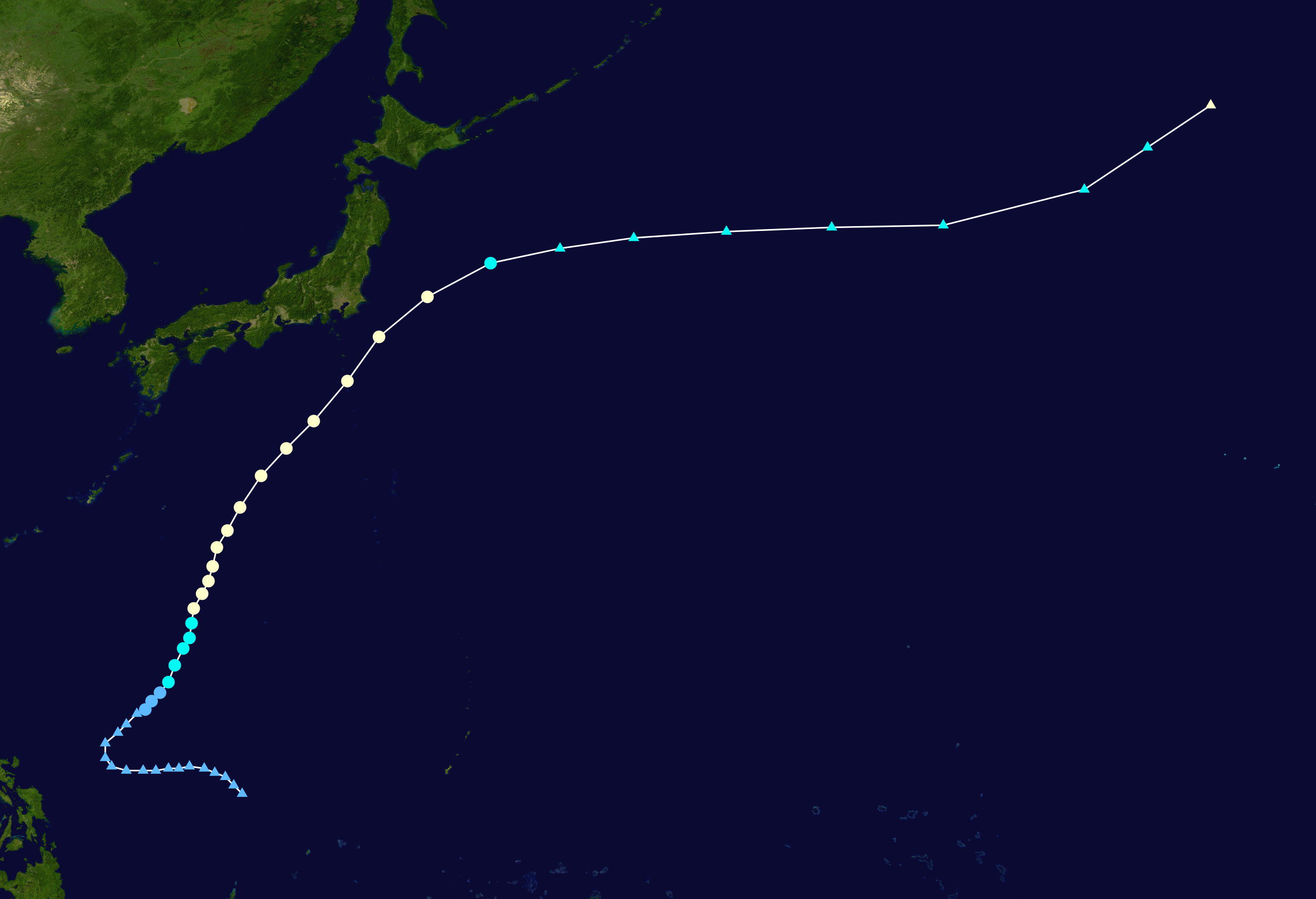
- Duration: May 27 – June 5
- Peak intensity: 130 km/h (80 mph) (1-min); 978 hPa (mbar)

Polly originated from an area of low pressure first detected 145 km (90 mi) north-northwest of Woleai on May 25. The JMA determined that the disturbance developed into a tropical depression on May 27, though the JTWC initiated warnings on the system on May 31. The cyclone gradually strengthened after formation, reaching tropical storm strength on June 1 and typhoon intensity the day after. On June 3, Polly reached peak intensity with sustained winds of 130 km/h (80 mph) and a minimum pressure of 978 mbar (hPa; 28.88 inHg), after which it began to slowly taper off in strength and accelerate northeastward. On June 5, Polly passed 190 km (120 mi) southeast of Tokyo as a low-end typhoon before recurving towards the east-northeast. The extratropical remnants of Polly reached the Bering Sea and the coast of Alaska on June 10 before dissipating. Polly was the first storm ever to be locally named by the Philippine Weather Bureau, receiving the name Auring.

Remaining offshore Japan, Polly's impacts were caused primarily by heavy rainfall. Flooding inundated caused 807 landslides and inundated over 36,000 homes. Another 11 houses and 270 bridges were washed away by the floods. Polly caused an estimated US$138 million in damage to crops, with the total damage figure in excess of US$143 million. Eighteen people were killed and another seventeen were injured; 20,702 others were homeless after Polly's passage.

=== Tropical Storm Rose (Bebeng) ===
- Tropical storm (JMA)
- Tropical storm (SSHWS)
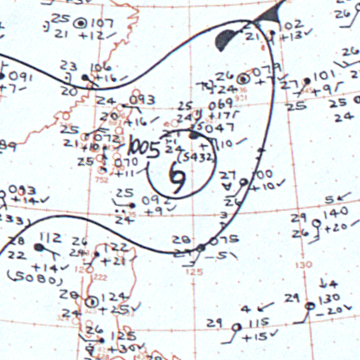
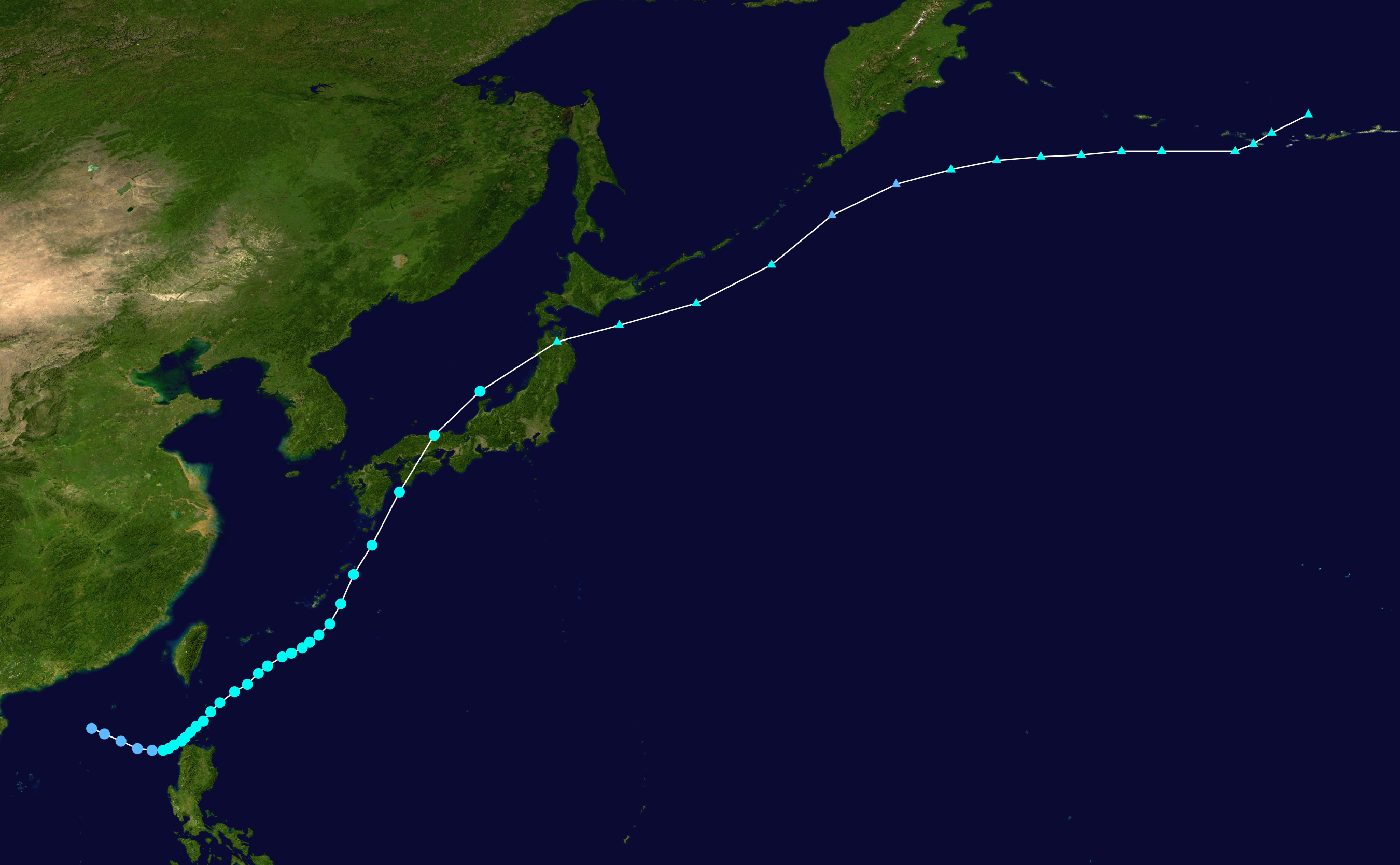
- Duration: June 6 – June 14
- Peak intensity: 95 km/h (60 mph) (1-min); 992 hPa (mbar)

Tropical Storm Rose began as a tropical depression in the South China Sea on June 6, and tracked southeastward towards Luzon in its early stages. On June 8, the JTWC began issuing warnings on Rose as a tropical storm while the cyclone was just off Luzon's northwestern coast. Slow strengthening continued thereafter, with Rose's peaking as a 95 km/h (60 mph) tropical storm as it was tracking across the Ryukyu Islands, though the storm's strongest winds were contained within a narrow rainband near the center. Moving rapidly northeastward, Rose passed over western Honshu as a lower-end tropical storm on June 13, briefly emerging into the Sea of Japan before recurving eastward and transitioning into an extratropical cyclone over northern Honshu on June 14. The remnants of Rose merged with another weak extratropical low off the Japanese coast, and this combined system continued eastward before dissipating over the Bering Sea on June 18.

=== Typhoon Shirley (Karing) ===
- Typhoon (JMA)
- Category 5-equivalent super typhoon (SSHWS)
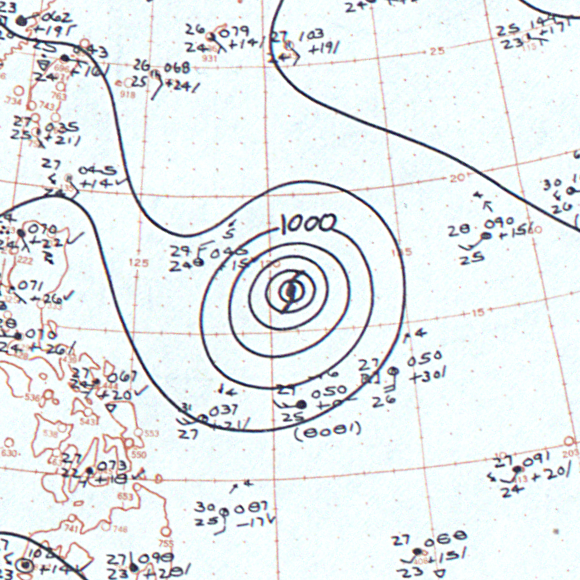
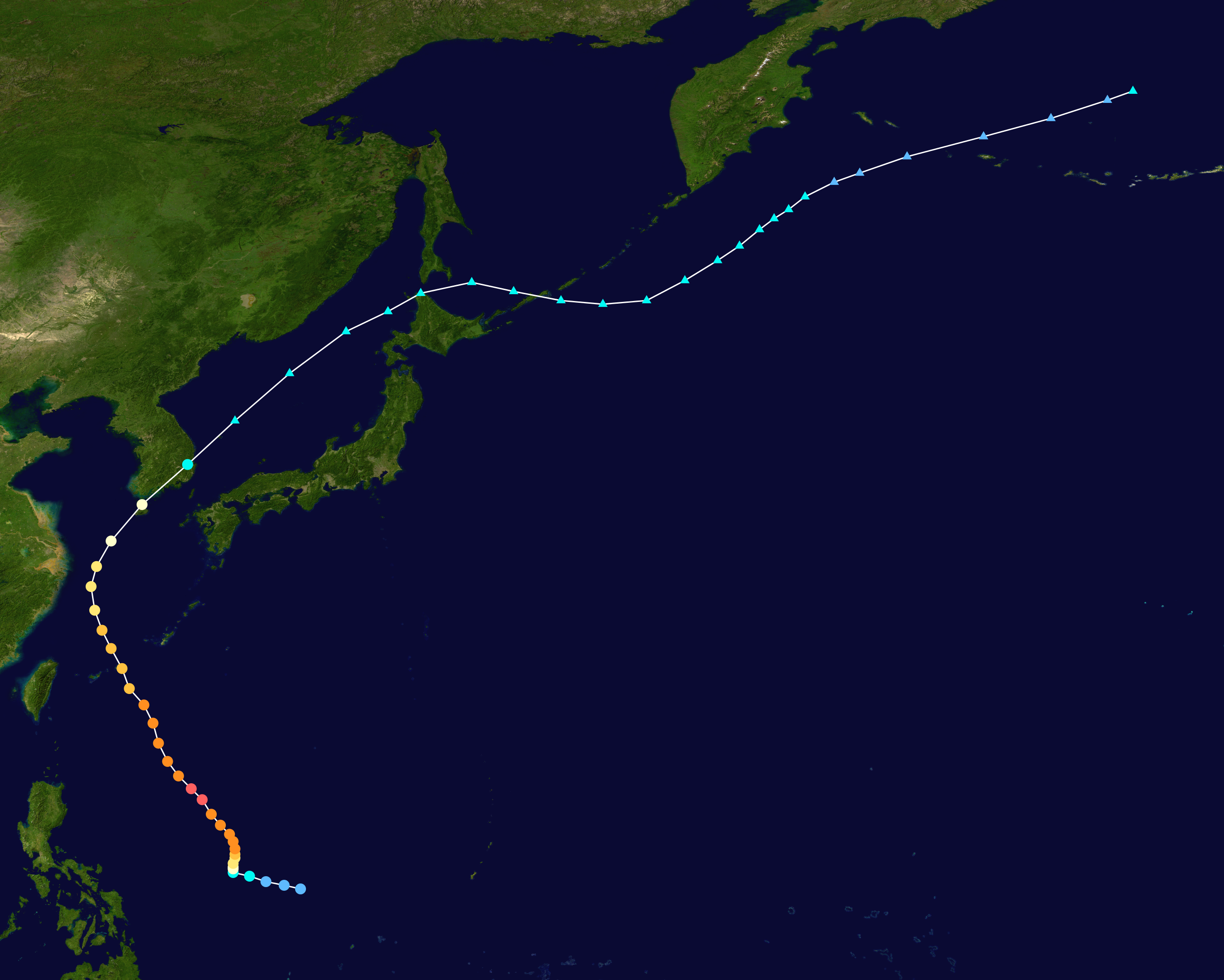
- Duration: June 12 – June 20
- Peak intensity: 260 km/h (160 mph) (1-min); 935 hPa (mbar)

=== Typhoon Trix (Diding) ===
- Typhoon (JMA)
- Category 1-equivalent typhoon (SSHWS)
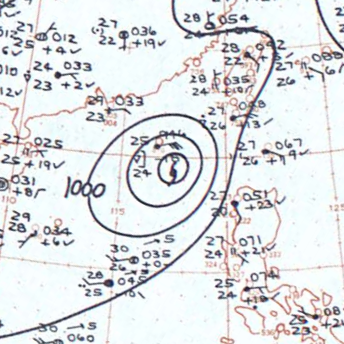
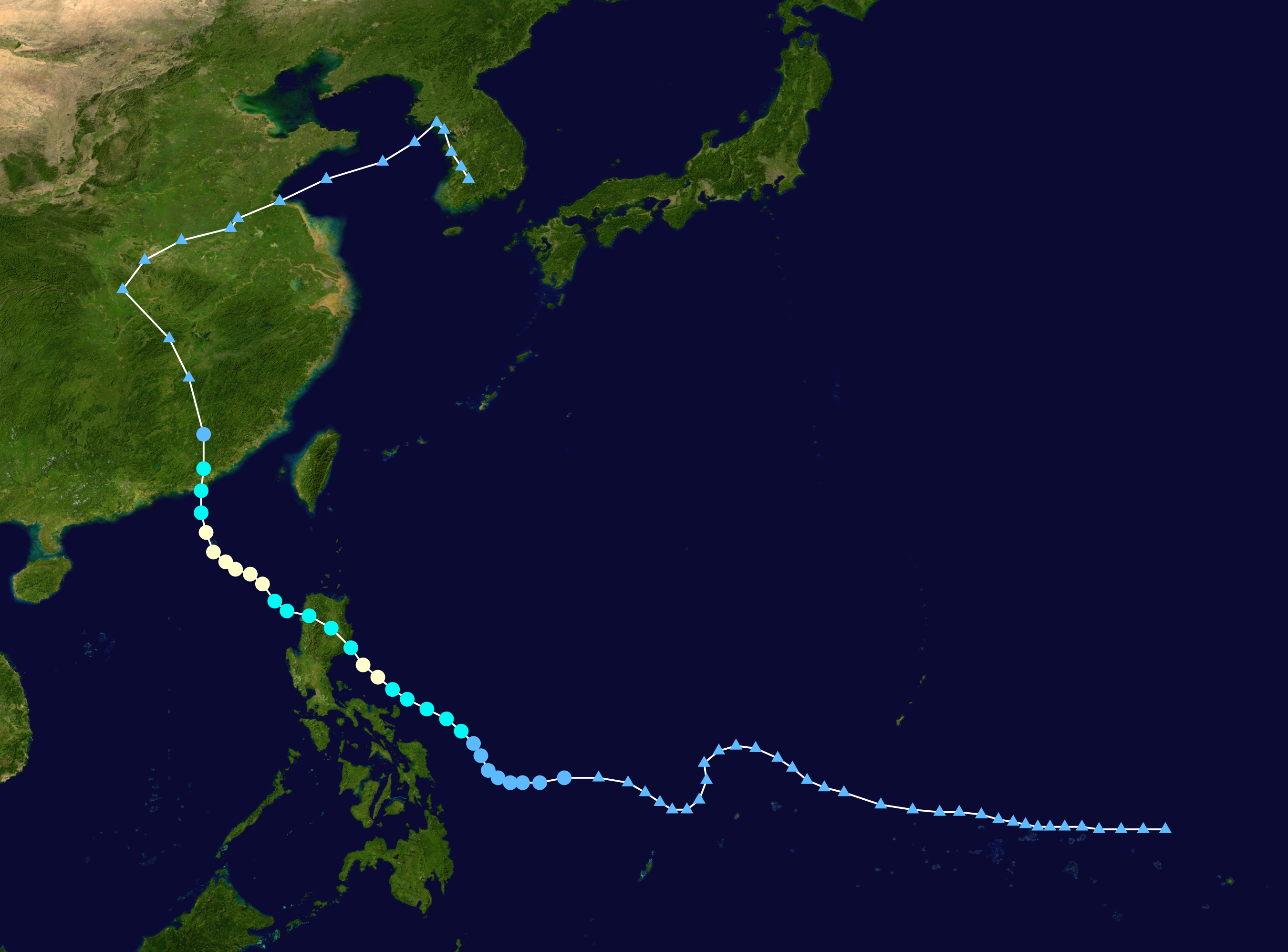
- Duration: June 15 – July 2
- Peak intensity: 130 km/h (80 mph) (1-min); 984 hPa (mbar)

Trix affected the Philippines and China.

=== Tropical Storm Virginia (Etang) ===
- Tropical storm (JMA)
- Tropical storm (SSHWS)
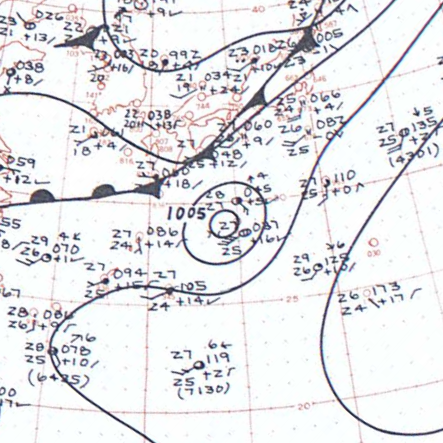
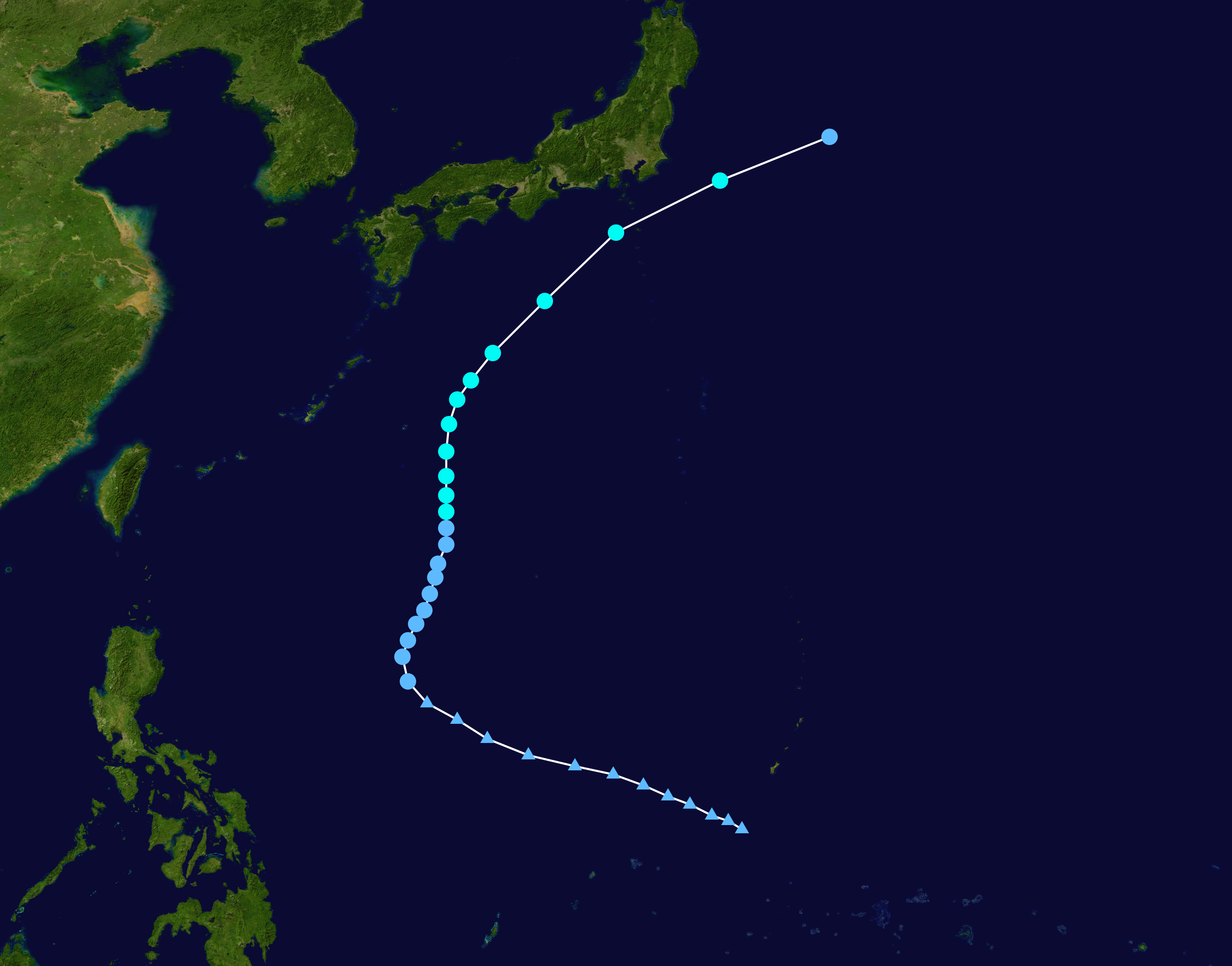
- Duration: July 1 – July 9
- Peak intensity: 95 km/h (60 mph) (1-min); 990 hPa (mbar)

=== Tropical Depression Gening ===
- Tropical depression (PAGASA)
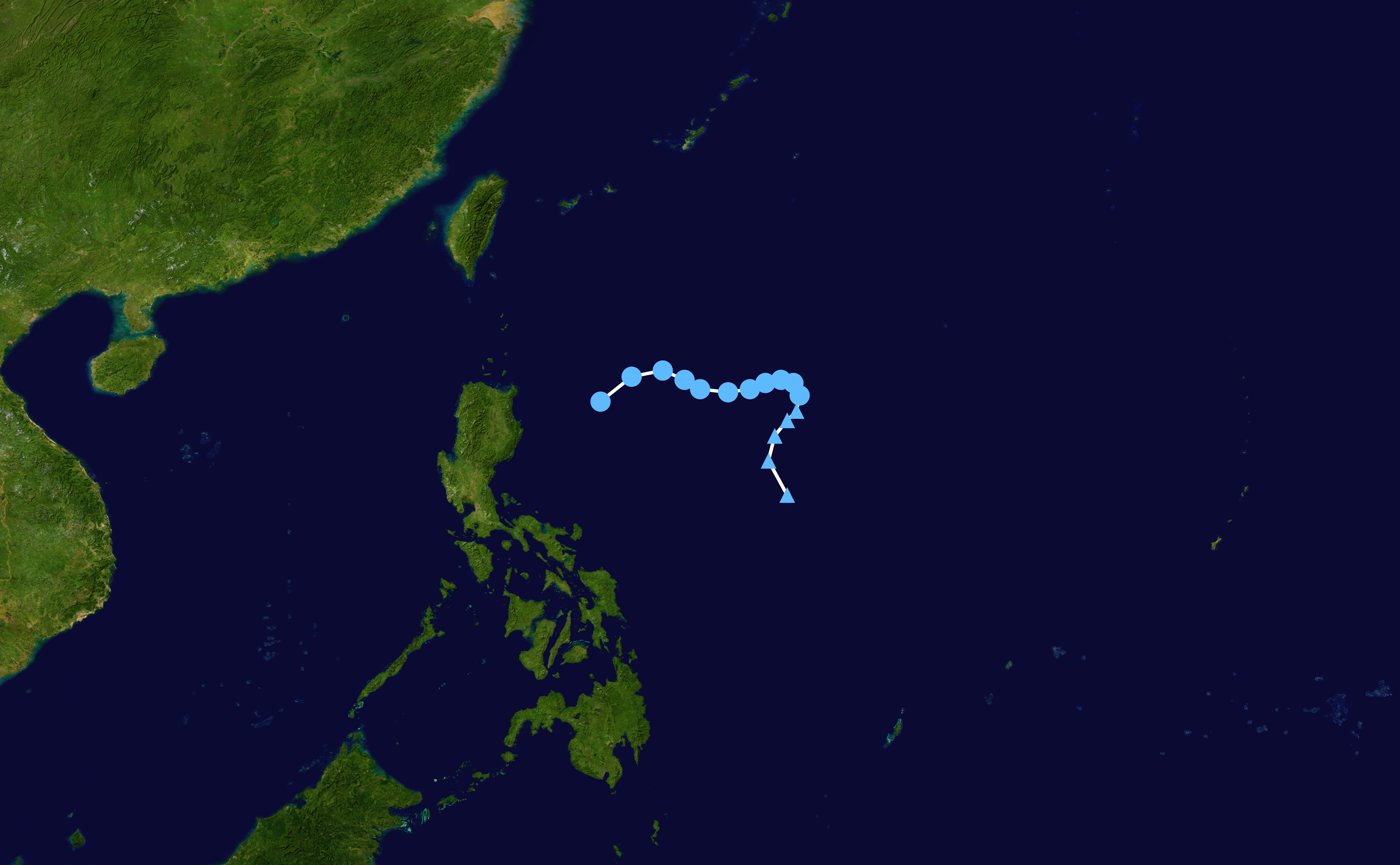
- Duration: July 11 – July 13
- Peak intensity: 55 km/h (35 mph) (10-min);

A system that lasted from July 11–13.

=== Typhoon Wendy (Herming) ===
- Typhoon (JMA)
- Category 4-equivalent typhoon (SSHWS)
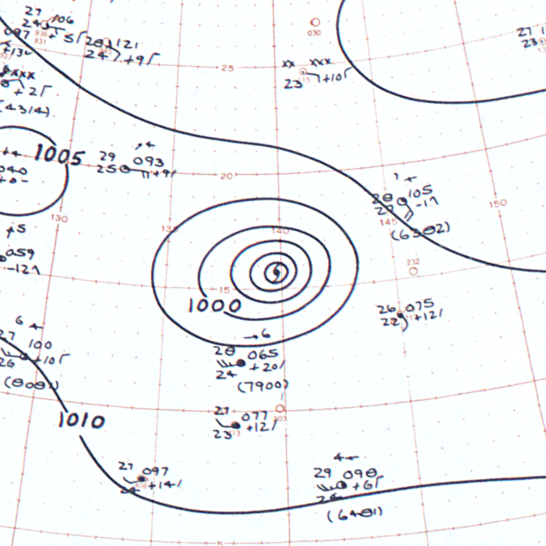
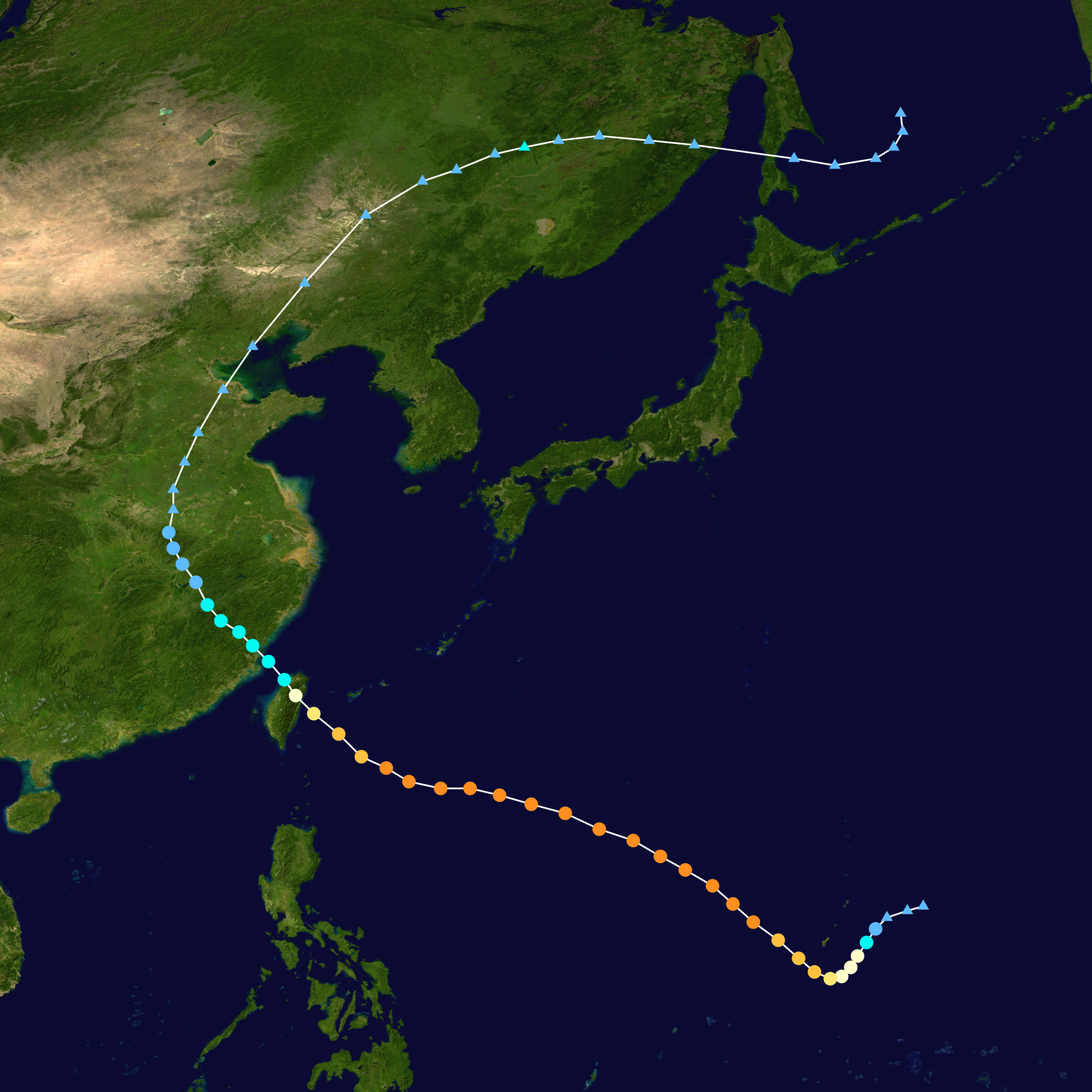
- Duration: July 9 – July 20
- Peak intensity: 250 km/h (155 mph) (1-min); 930 hPa (mbar)

=== CMA Tropical Depression 09 ===
- Tropical depression (CMA)
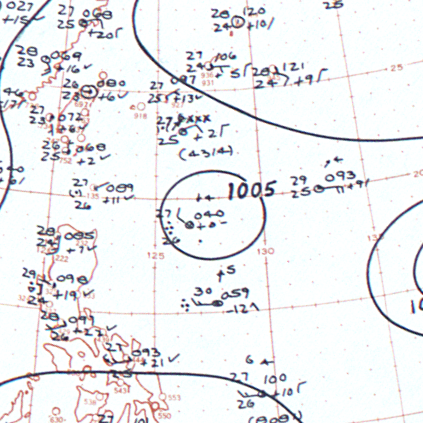
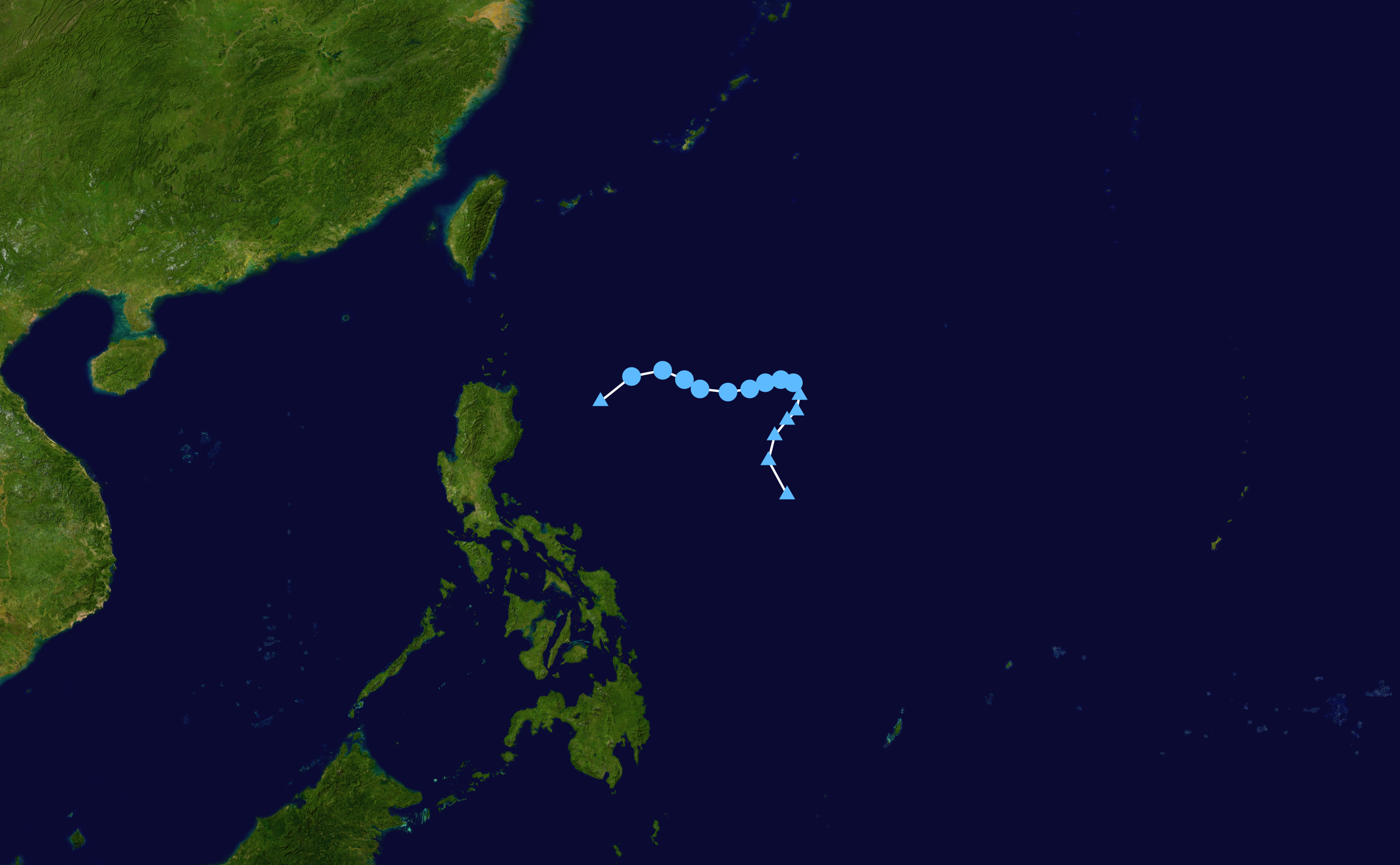
- Duration: July 11 – July 13
- Peak intensity: 55 km/h (35 mph) (10-min); 1002 hPa (mbar)

=== Typhoon Agnes (Ising) ===
- Typhoon (JMA)
- Category 2-equivalent typhoon (SSHWS)
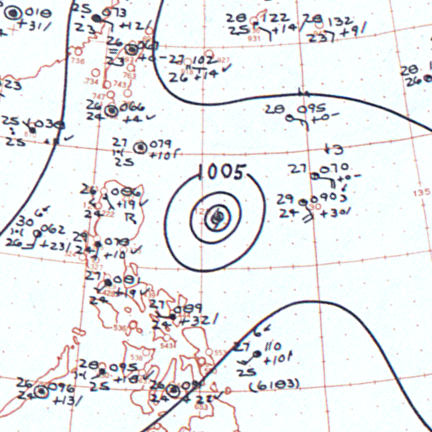
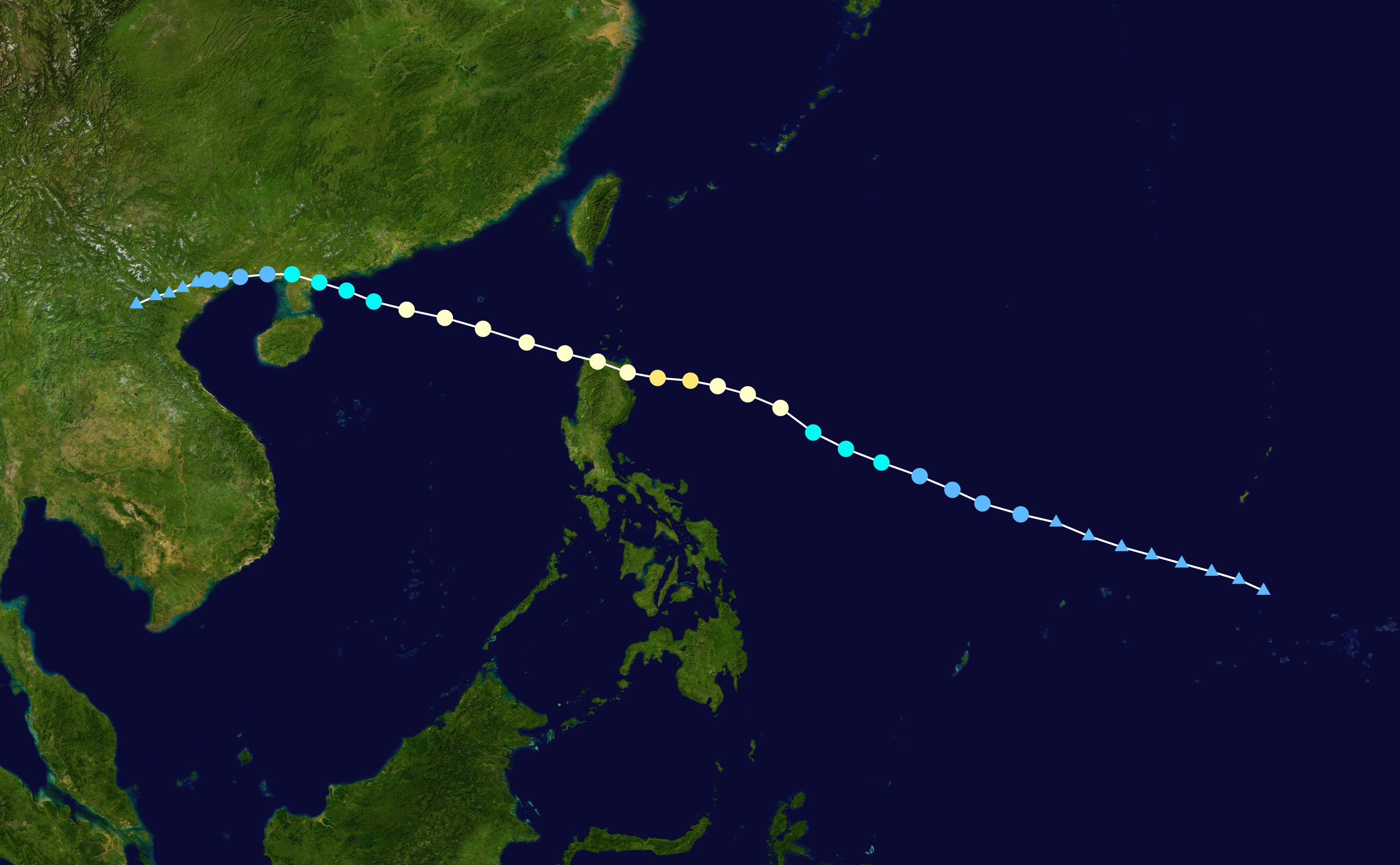
- Duration: July 15 – July 24
- Peak intensity: 155 km/h (100 mph) (1-min); 992 hPa (mbar)

=== Typhoon Bess ===
- Typhoon (JMA)
- Category 4-equivalent typhoon (SSHWS)
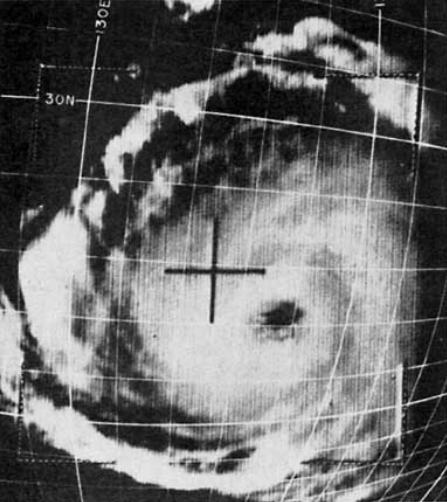
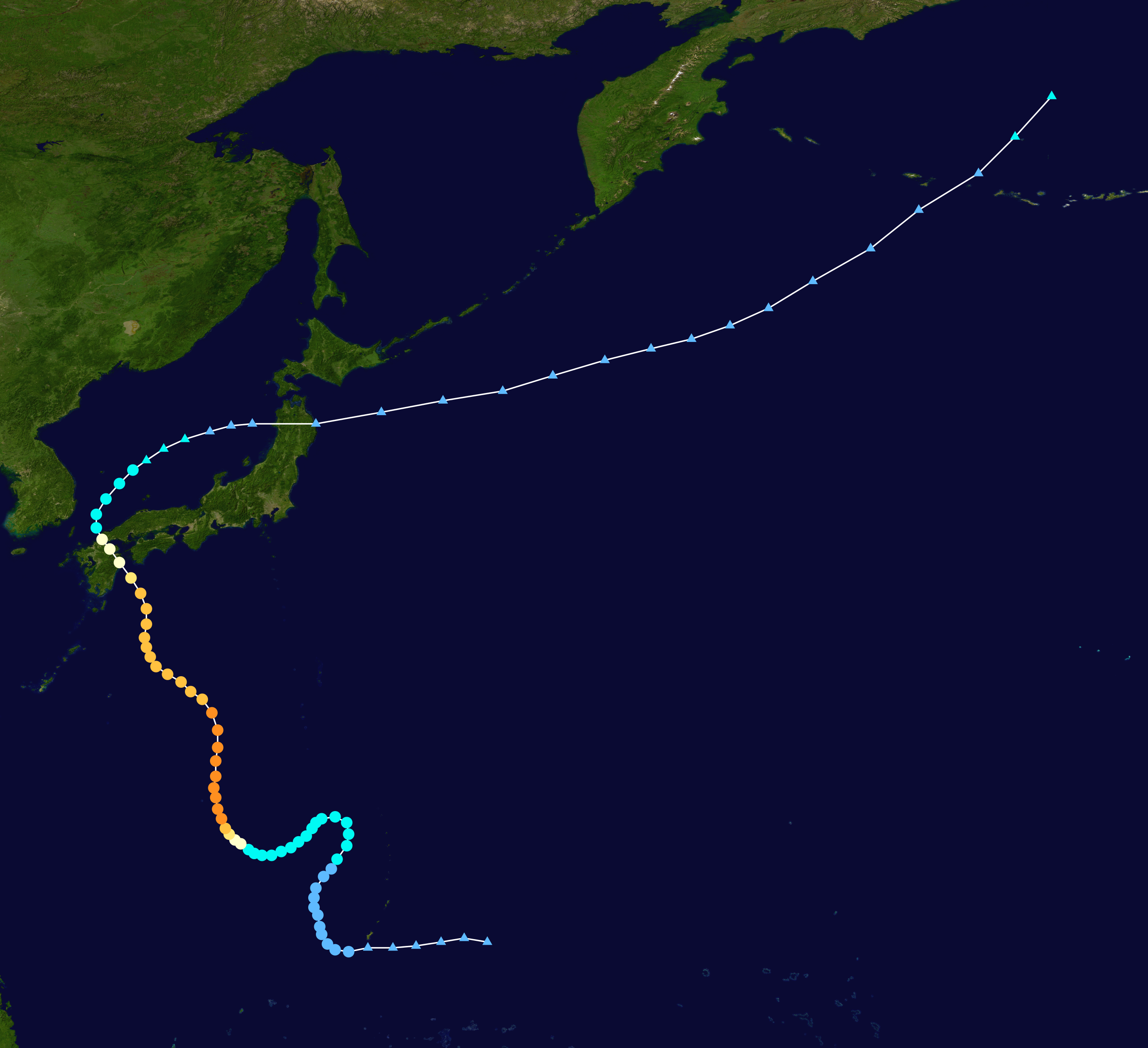
- Duration: July 25 – August 11
- Peak intensity: 240 km/h (150 mph) (1-min); 930 hPa (mbar)

On July 27 Tropical Depression 20W formed in the West Pacific. It drifted northward, reaching tropical storm on the 30th before turning to the southwest. Bess turned to the north on August 2, and reached typhoon status early on the 3rd. Bess rapidly intensified to a peak of 150 mph on the 4th, but weakened as it continued northward. On the 9th it struck Japan, and on the 11th Bess became extratropical. At the time, Bess had the longest longevity of a Western Pacific tropical cyclone. Typhoon Bess caused severe damage on the island of Kyūshū. 23 people were killed and 6 were missing.

=== Tropical Depression 21W ===
- Tropical depression (JMA)
- Tropical storm (SSHWS)
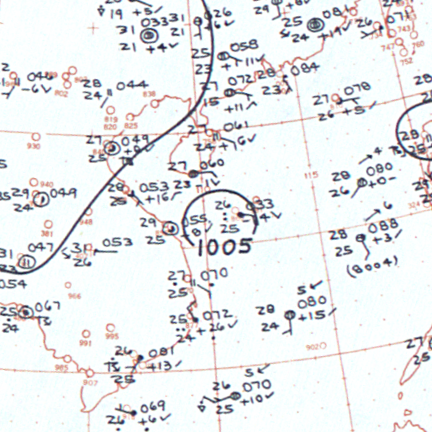
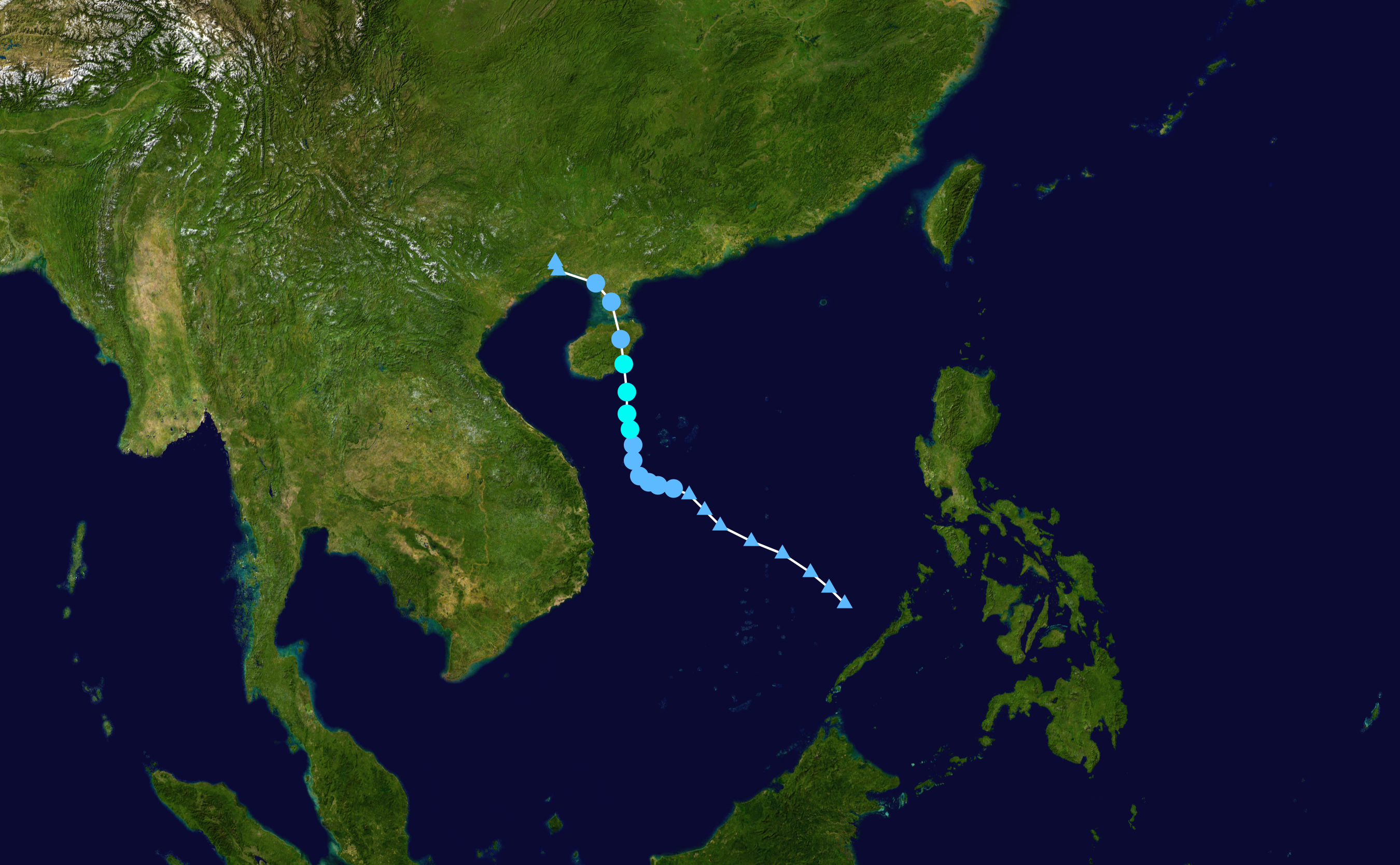
- Duration: July 29 – August 2
- Peak intensity: 65 km/h (40 mph) (1-min); 997 hPa (mbar)

=== Typhoon Carmen (Luding) ===
- Typhoon (JMA)
- Category 4-equivalent typhoon (SSHWS)
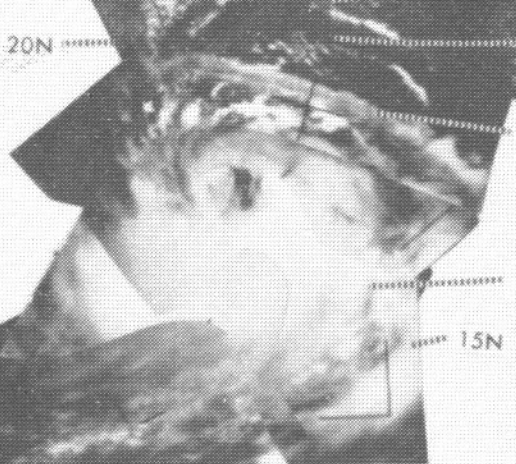
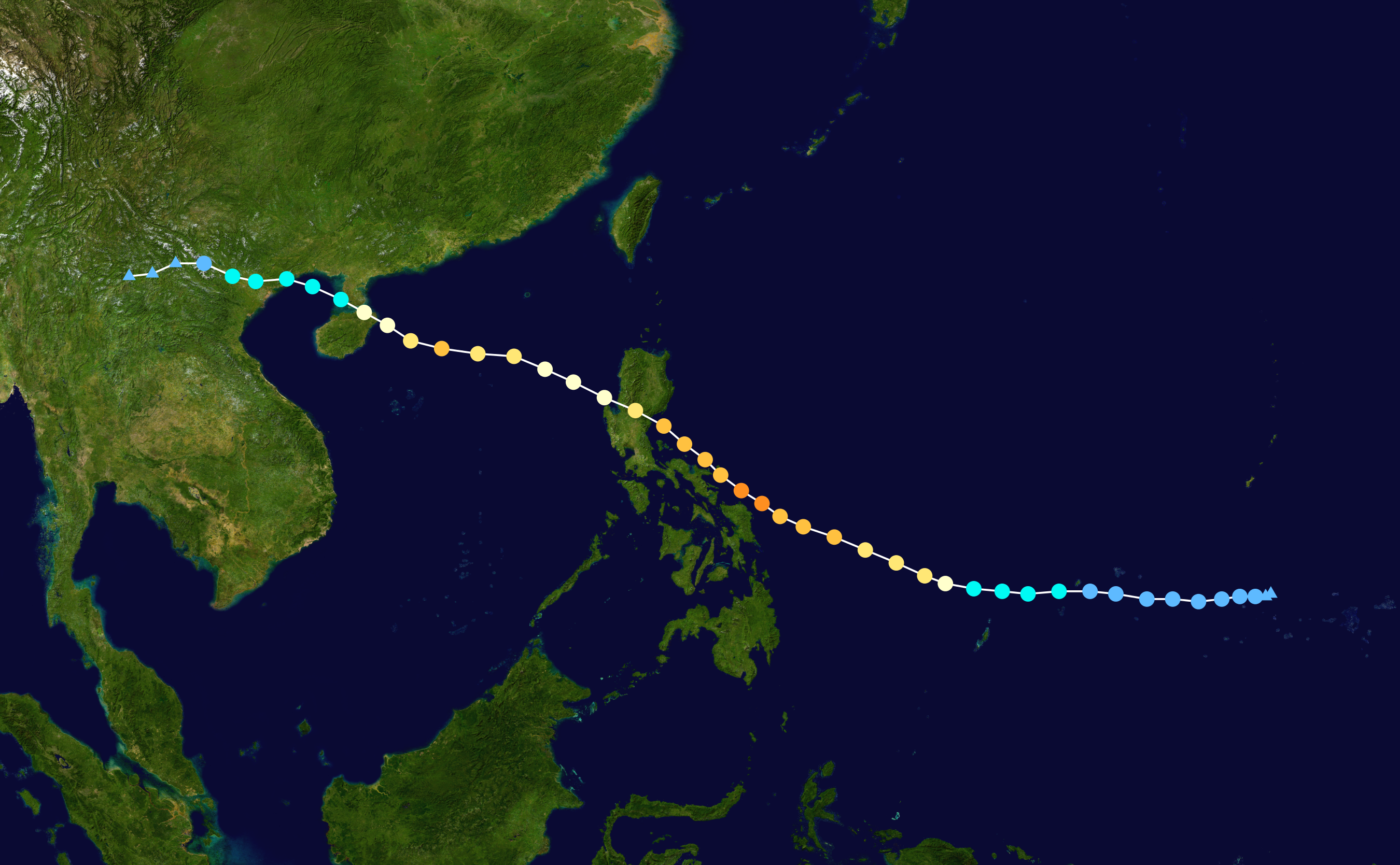
- Duration: August 8 – August 18
- Peak intensity: 230 km/h (145 mph) (1-min); 930 hPa (mbar)

=== CMA Tropical Depression 14 ===
- Tropical depression (CMA)
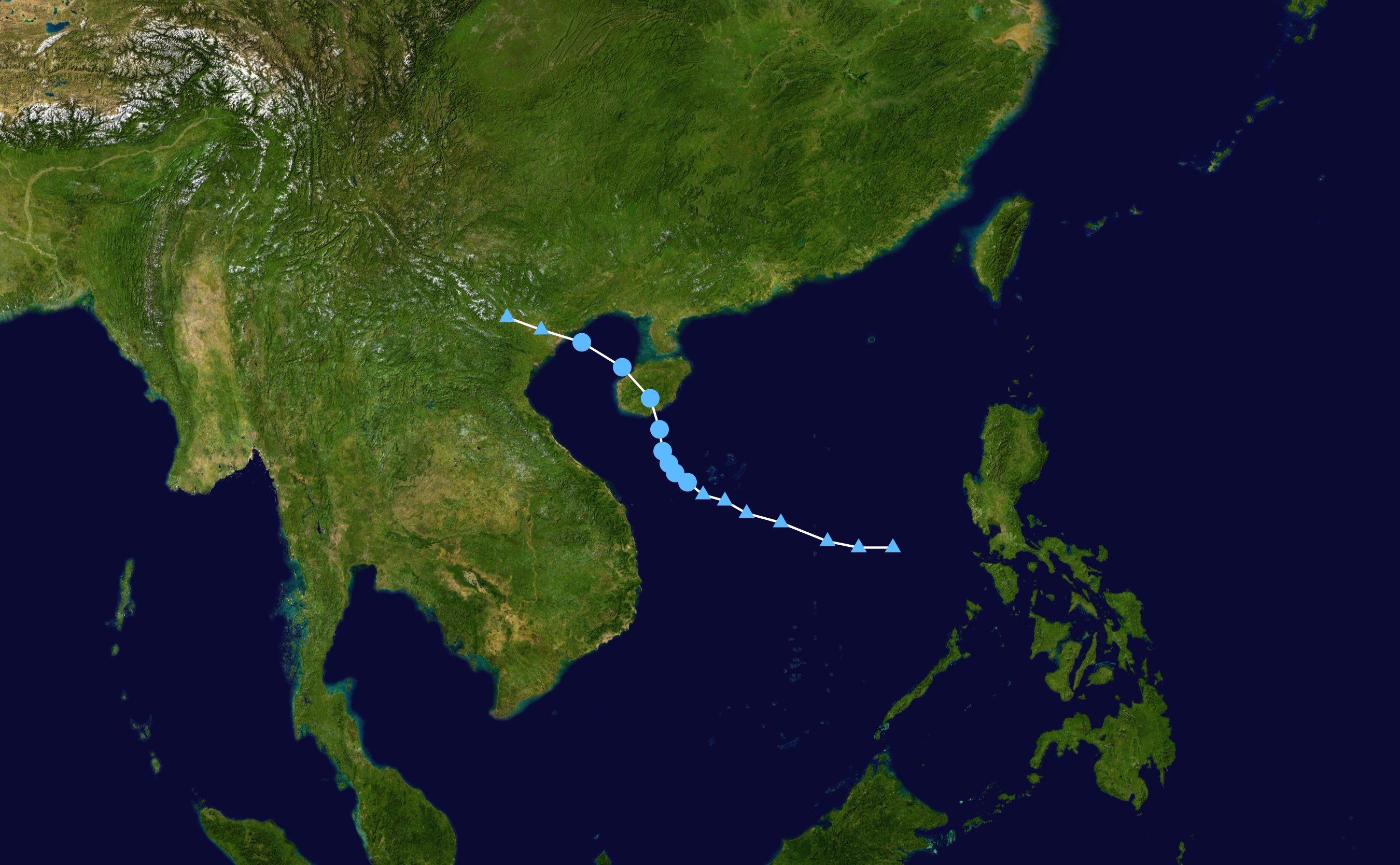
- Duration: August 21 – August 23
- Peak intensity: 55 km/h (35 mph) (10-min); 1001 hPa (mbar)

=== Typhoon Elaine ===
- Typhoon (JMA)
- Category 3-equivalent typhoon (SSHWS)
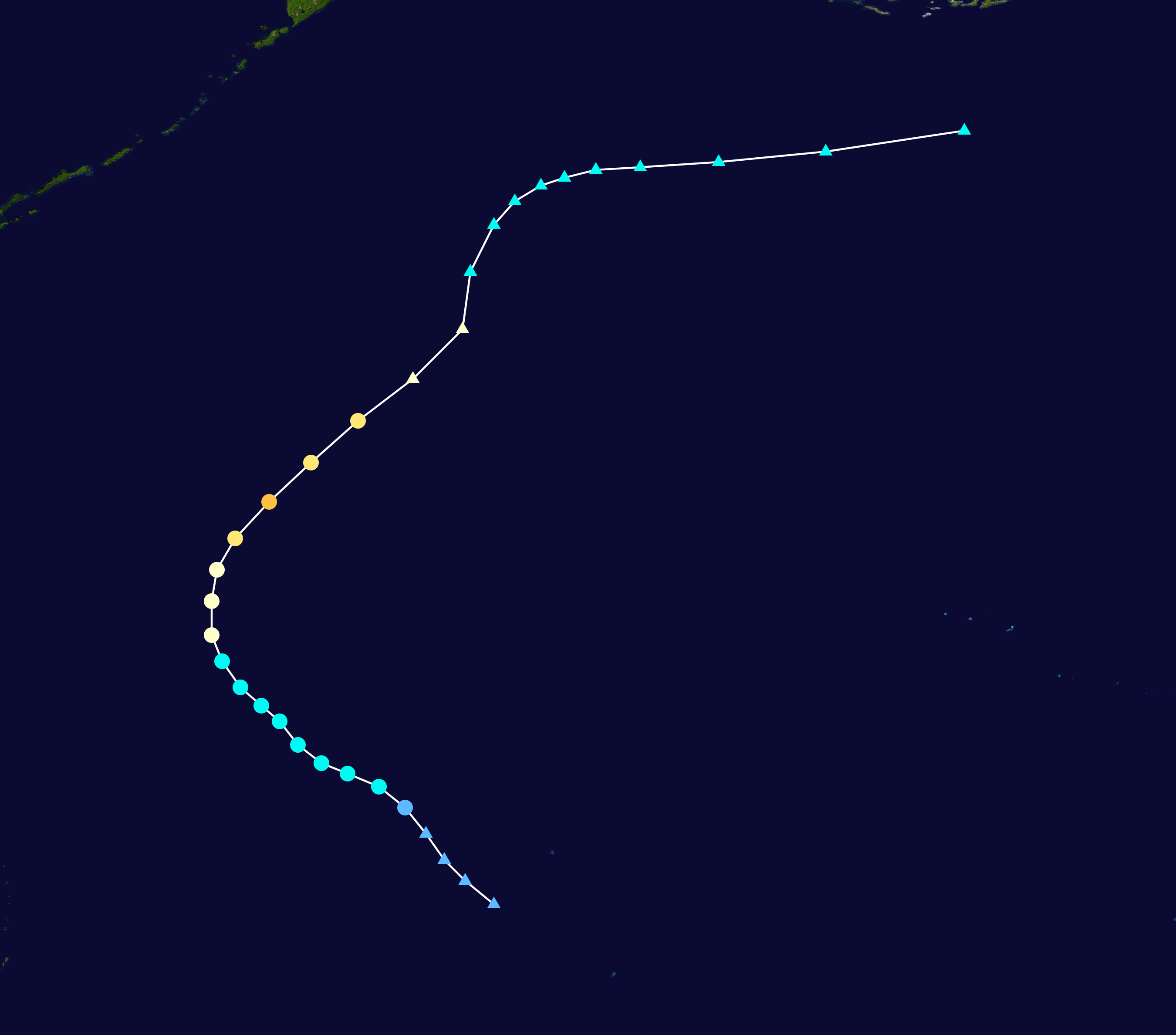
- Duration: August 23 – August 27
- Peak intensity: 185 km/h (115 mph) (1-min); 965 hPa (mbar)

=== Typhoon Della ===
- Typhoon (JMA)
- Category 3-equivalent typhoon (SSHWS)
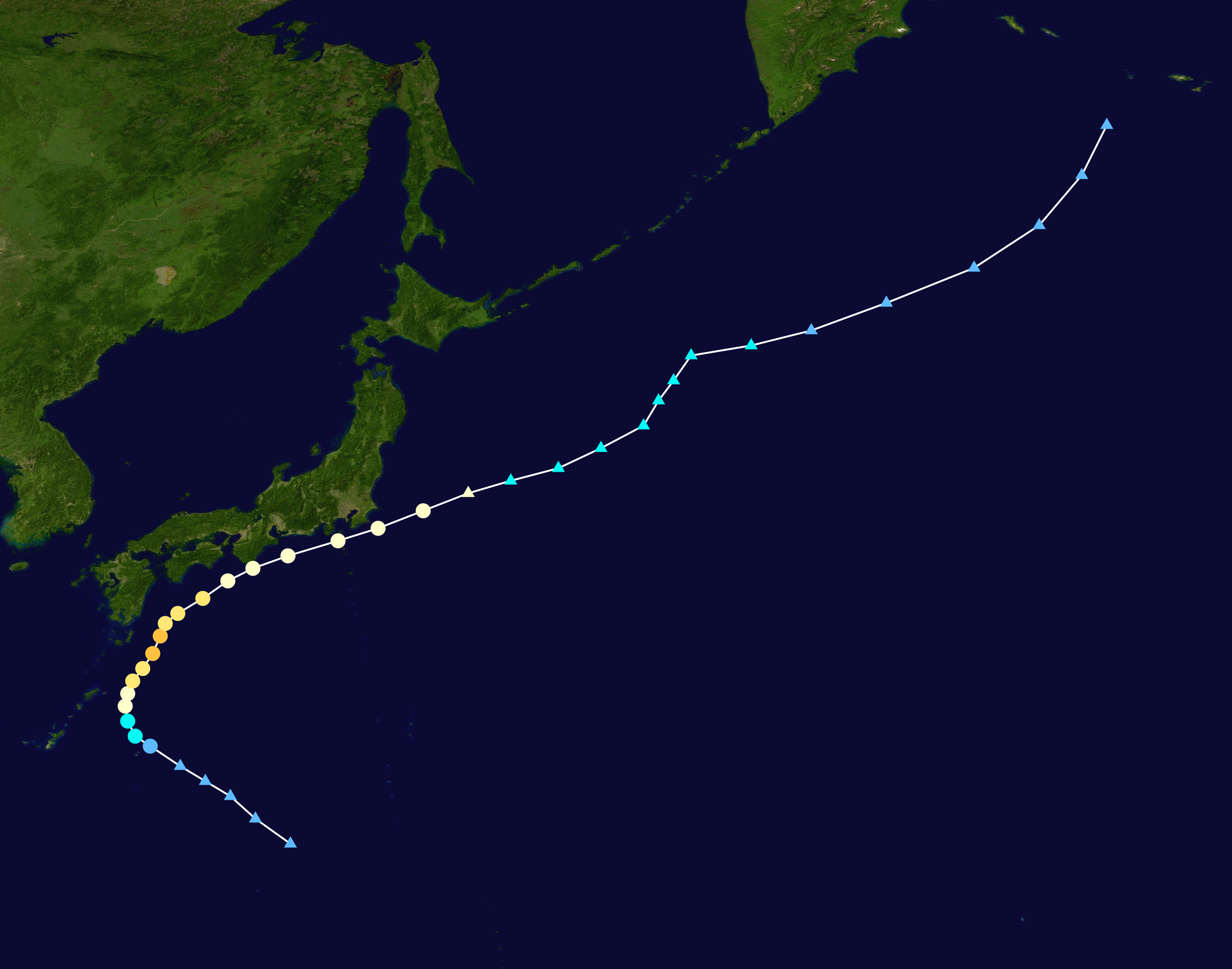
- Duration: August 23 – August 29
- Peak intensity: 185 km/h (115 mph) (1-min); 975 hPa (mbar)

=== Tropical Depression Mameng ===
- Tropical depression (SSHWS)
- Duration: August 27 – August 28
- Peak intensity: 55 km/h (35 mph) (1-min);

=== Typhoon Faye (Neneng) ===
- Typhoon (JMA)
- Category 3-equivalent typhoon (SSHWS)
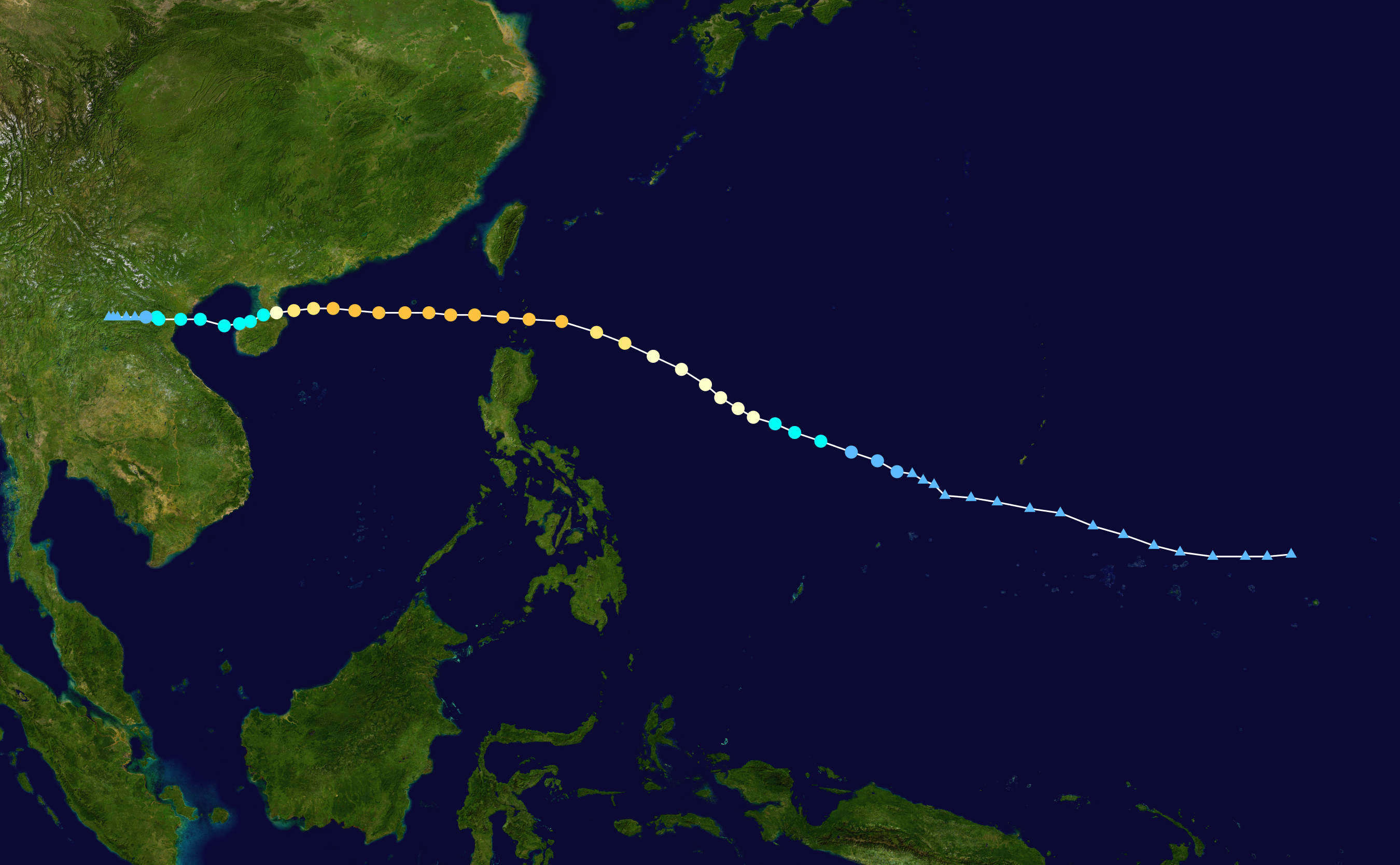
- Duration: August 28 – September 11
- Peak intensity: 205 km/h (125 mph) (1-min); 960 hPa (mbar)

Typhoon Faye struck Hong Kong killing 3 people.

=== CMA Tropical Depression 17 ===
- Tropical depression (CMA)
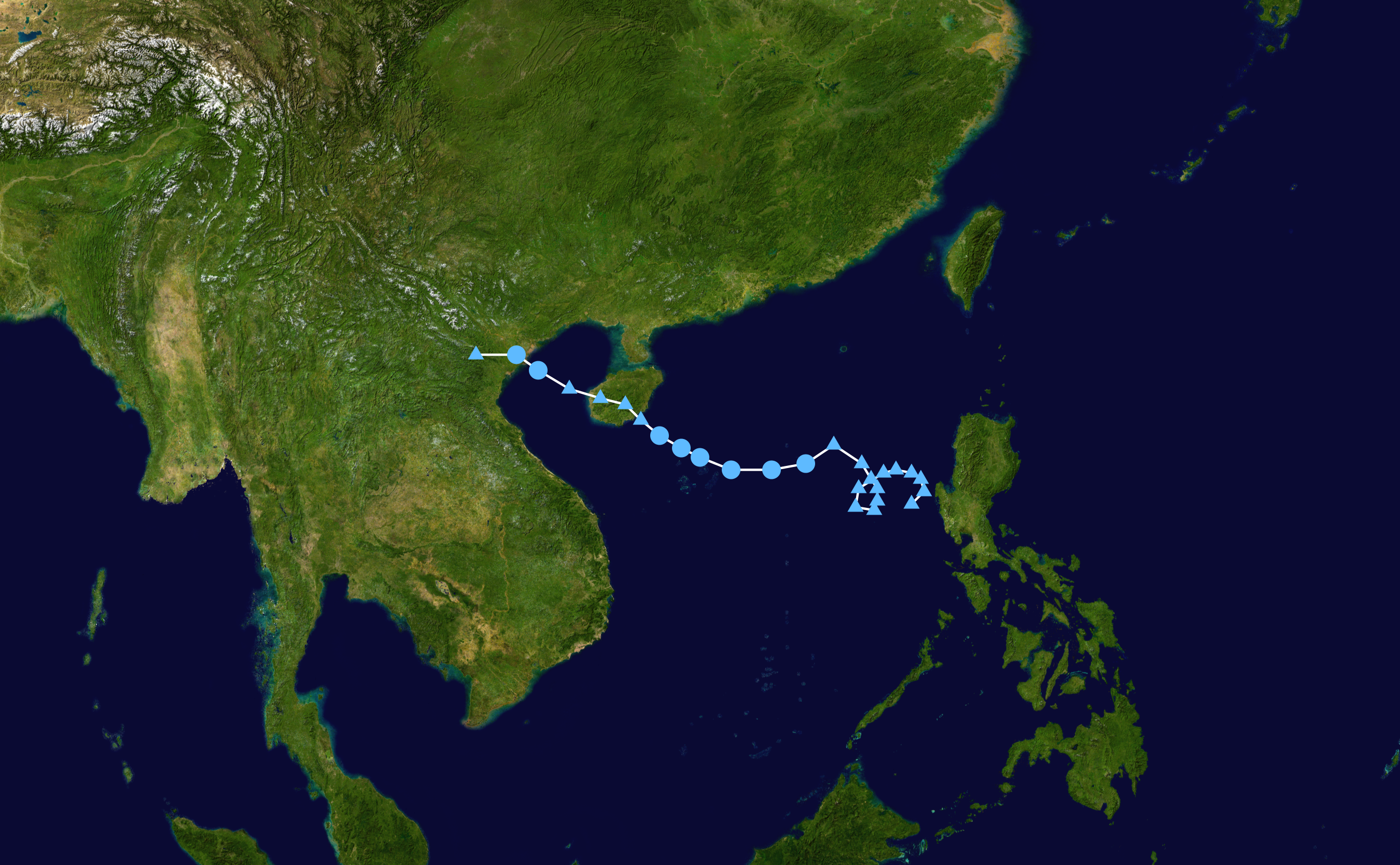
- Duration: August 28 – August 31
- Peak intensity: 55 km/h (35 mph) (10-min); 997 hPa (mbar)

=== Tropical Depression 26W ===
- Tropical depression (SSHWS)
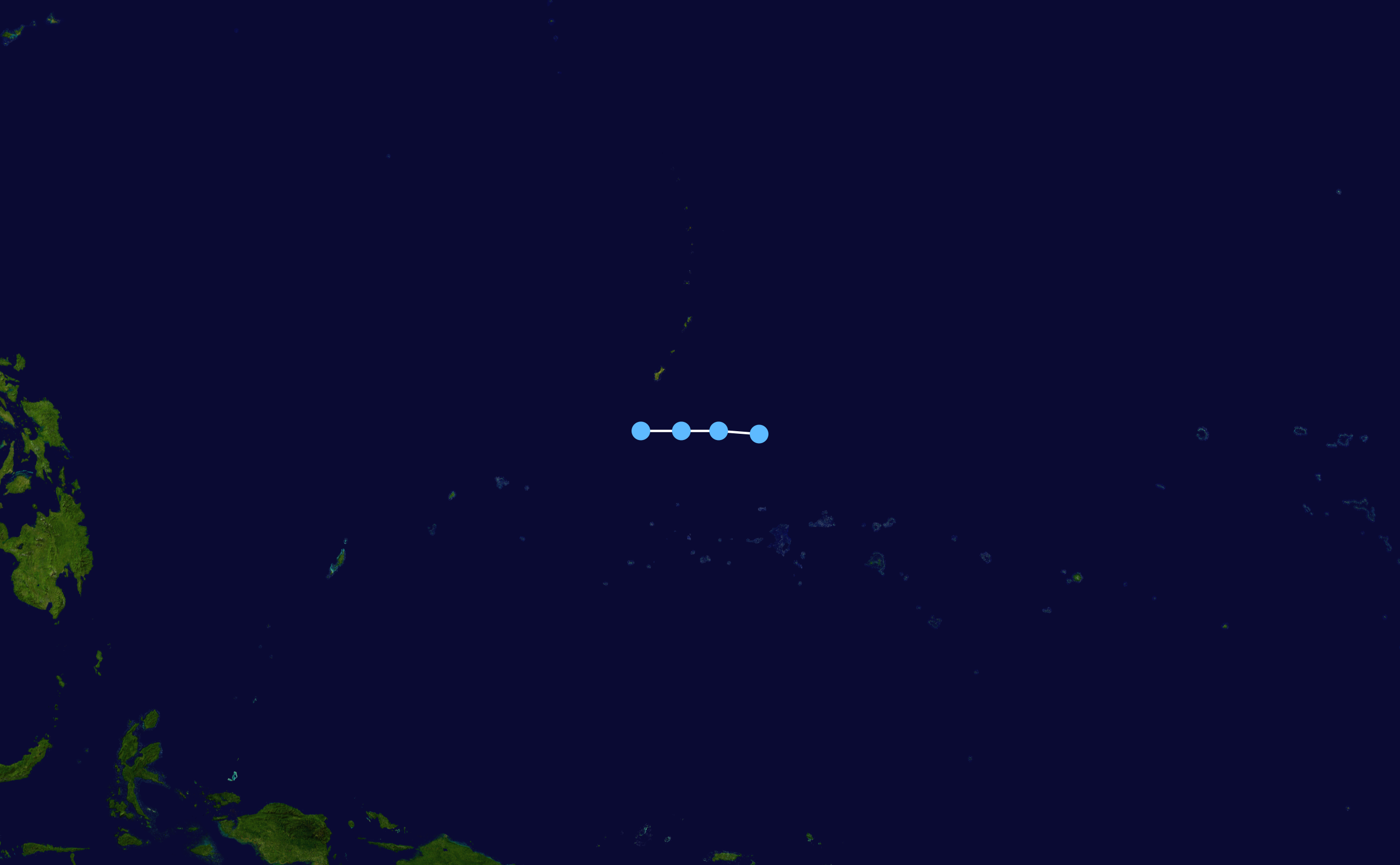
- Duration: August 26 – August 26
- Peak intensity: 45 km/h (30 mph) (1-min);

=== CMA Tropical Depression 19 ===
- Tropical depression (CMA)
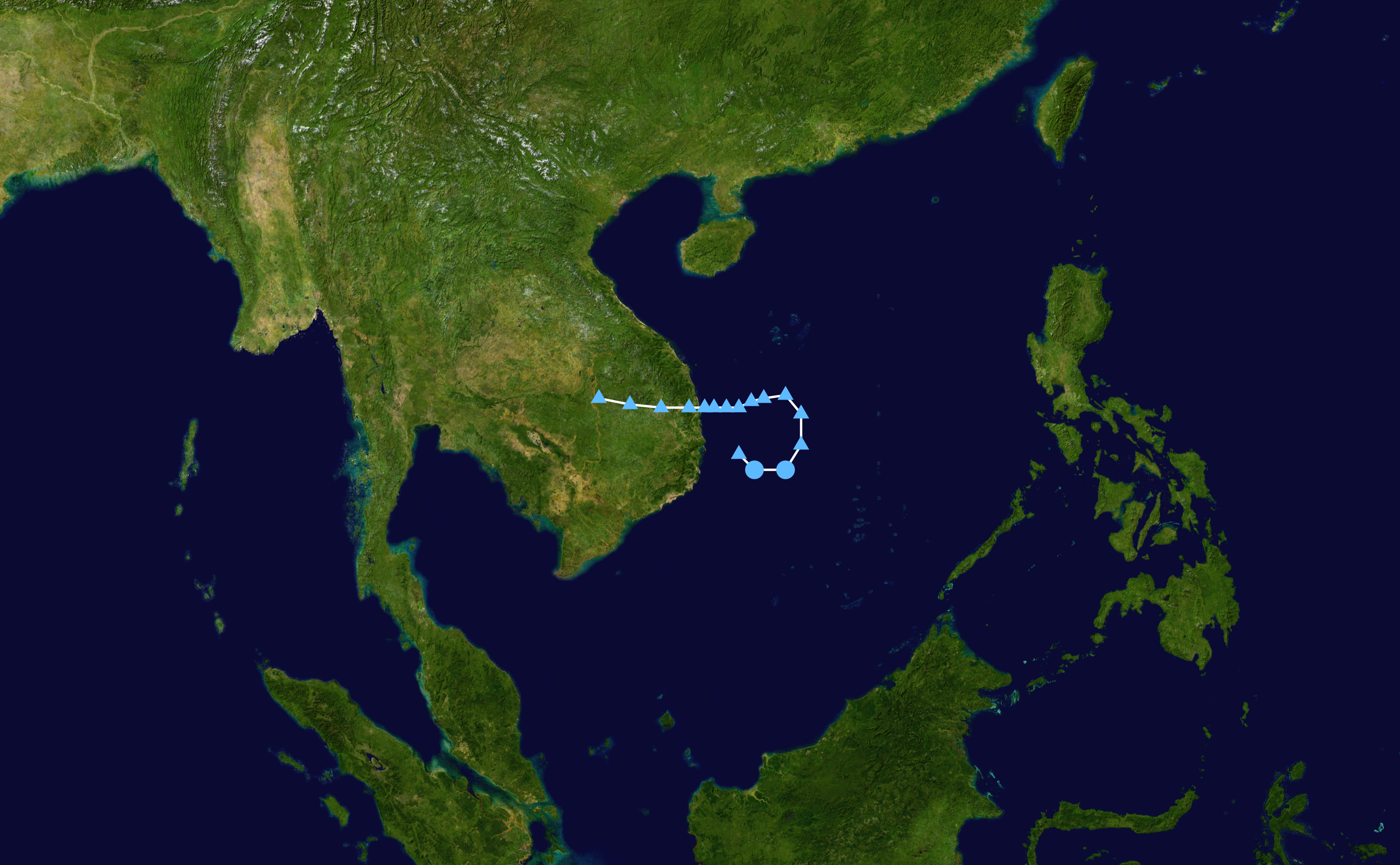
- Duration: September 1 – September 2
- Peak intensity: 45 km/h (30 mph) (10-min); 1002 hPa (mbar)

=== Typhoon Gloria (Oniang) ===
- Typhoon (JMA)
- Category 4-equivalent typhoon (SSHWS)
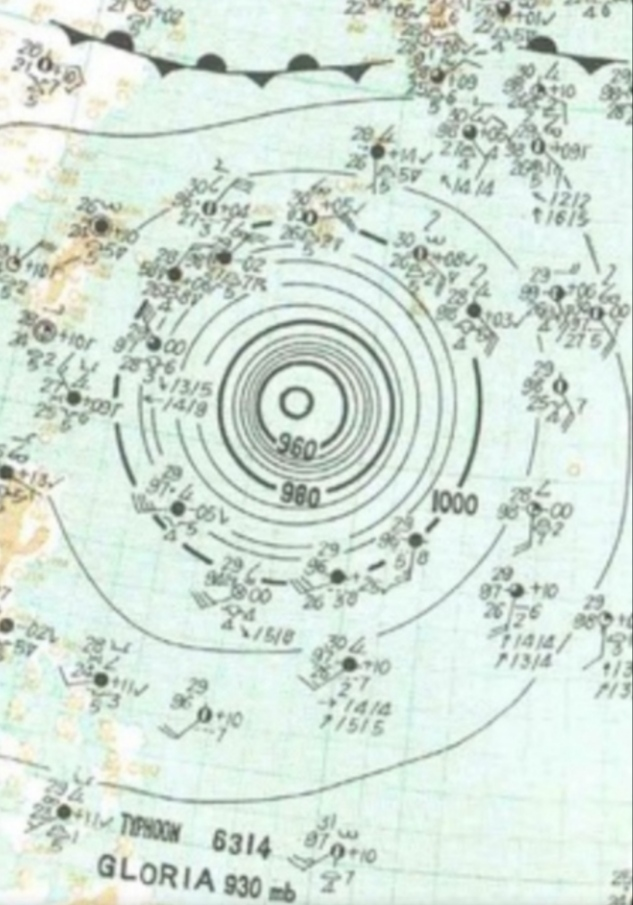
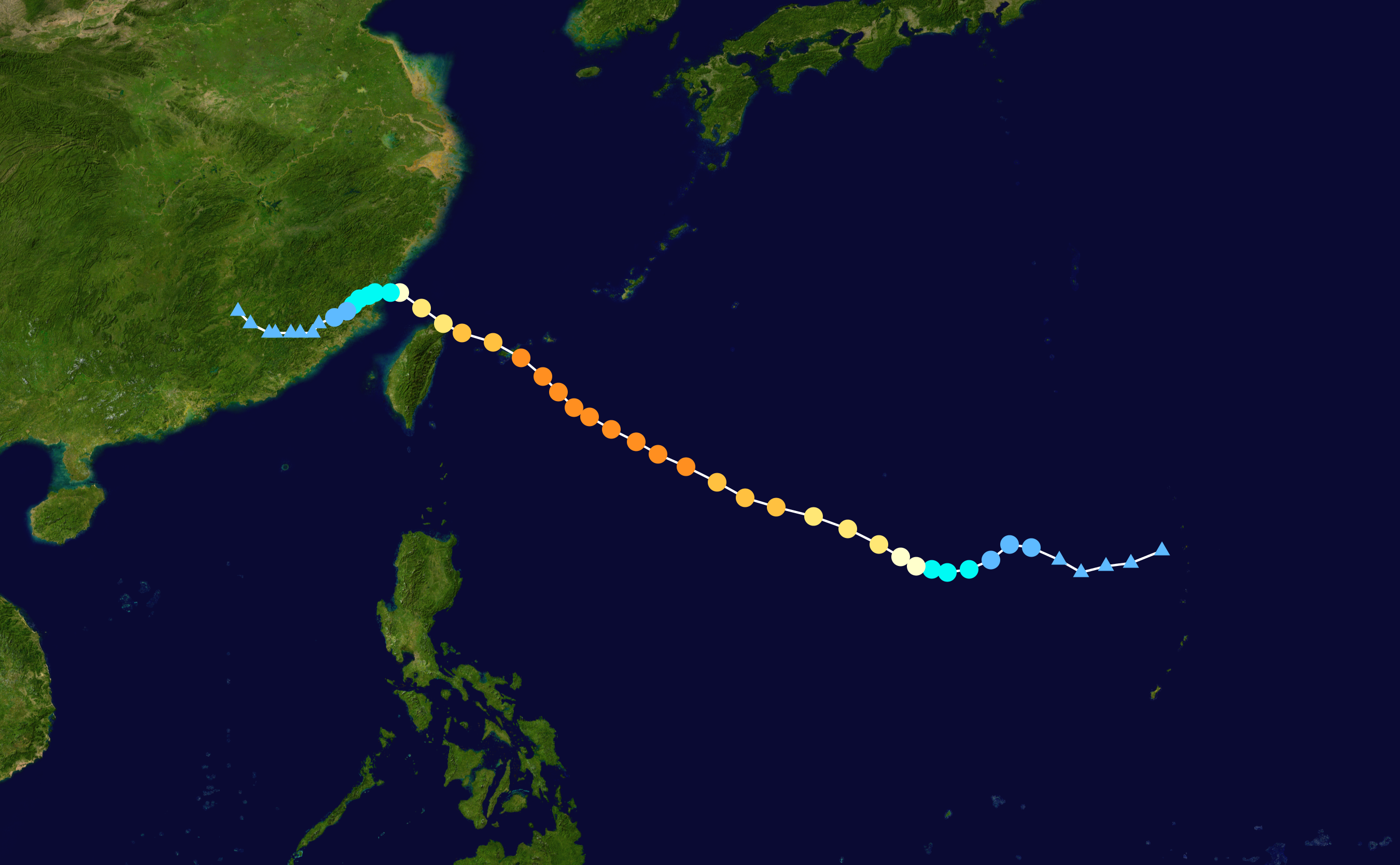
- Duration: September 3 – September 15
- Peak intensity: 250 km/h (155 mph) (1-min); 920 hPa (mbar)

Typhoon Gloria, known in the Philippines as Typhoon Oniang was a typhoon of the 1963 Pacific typhoon season. Gloria impacted Taiwan and China.

Typhoon Gloria developed on September 5, over the open waters of the West Pacific. The storm rapidly intensified to a peak of 155 mph on September 9. It weakened as it continued west-northwestward, and made landfall on extreme northeastern Taiwan on September 11, as a 100 mph typhoon. The typhoon caused severe flooding in Northern Taiwan and killed hundreds of people. Gloria continued westward, and hit eastern China that night as an 85 mph typhoon. The storm looped over land to the northeast, and dissipated on September 13, to the east of China. Gloria killed 239 people, and left 89 missing.

=== Tropical Storm Hester (Pepang) ===
- Tropical storm (JMA)
- Tropical storm (SSHWS)
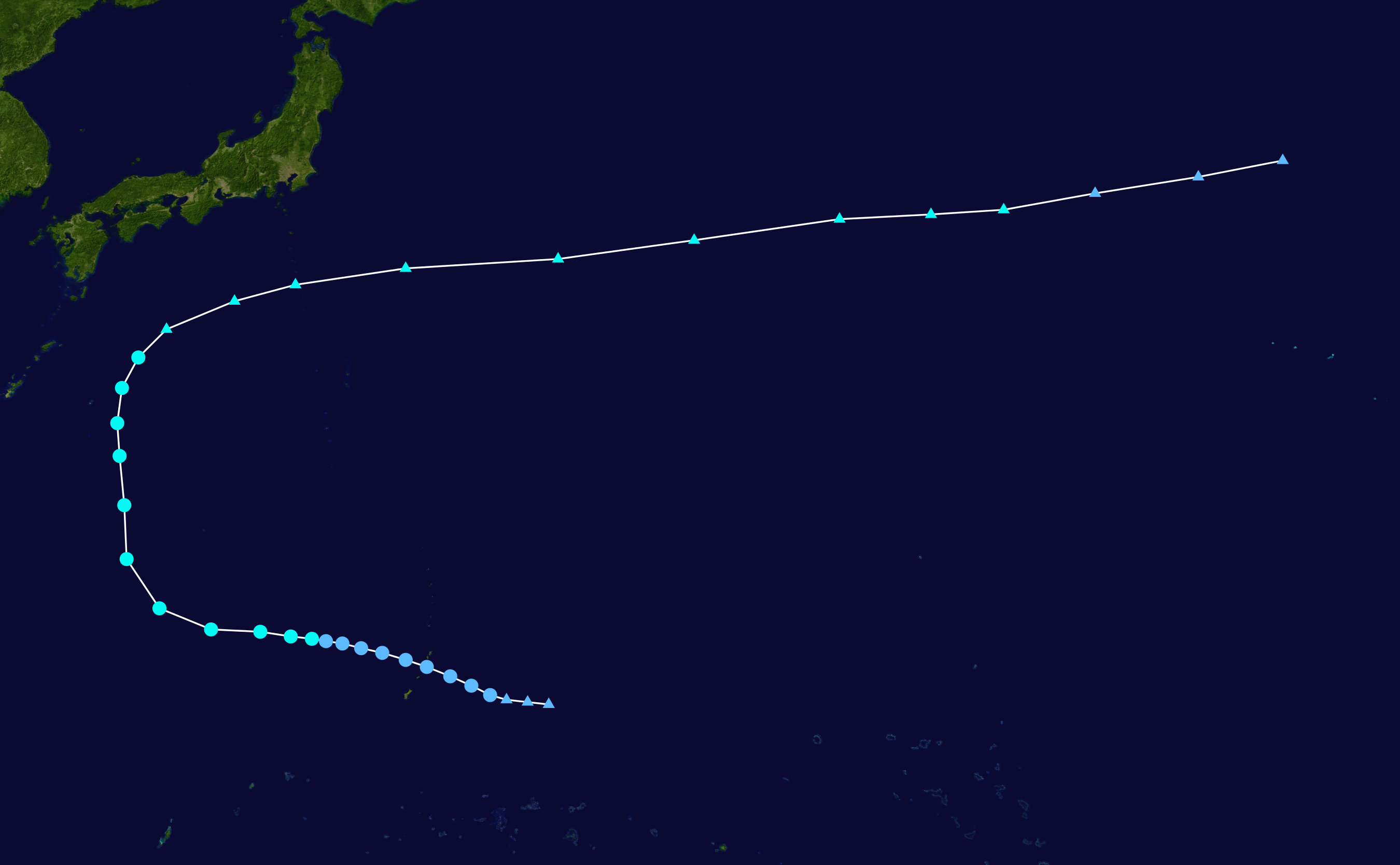
- Duration: September 7 – September 13
- Peak intensity: 85 km/h (50 mph) (1-min); 998 hPa (mbar)

=== Tropical Storm Irma ===
- Tropical storm (JMA)
- Tropical storm (SSHWS)
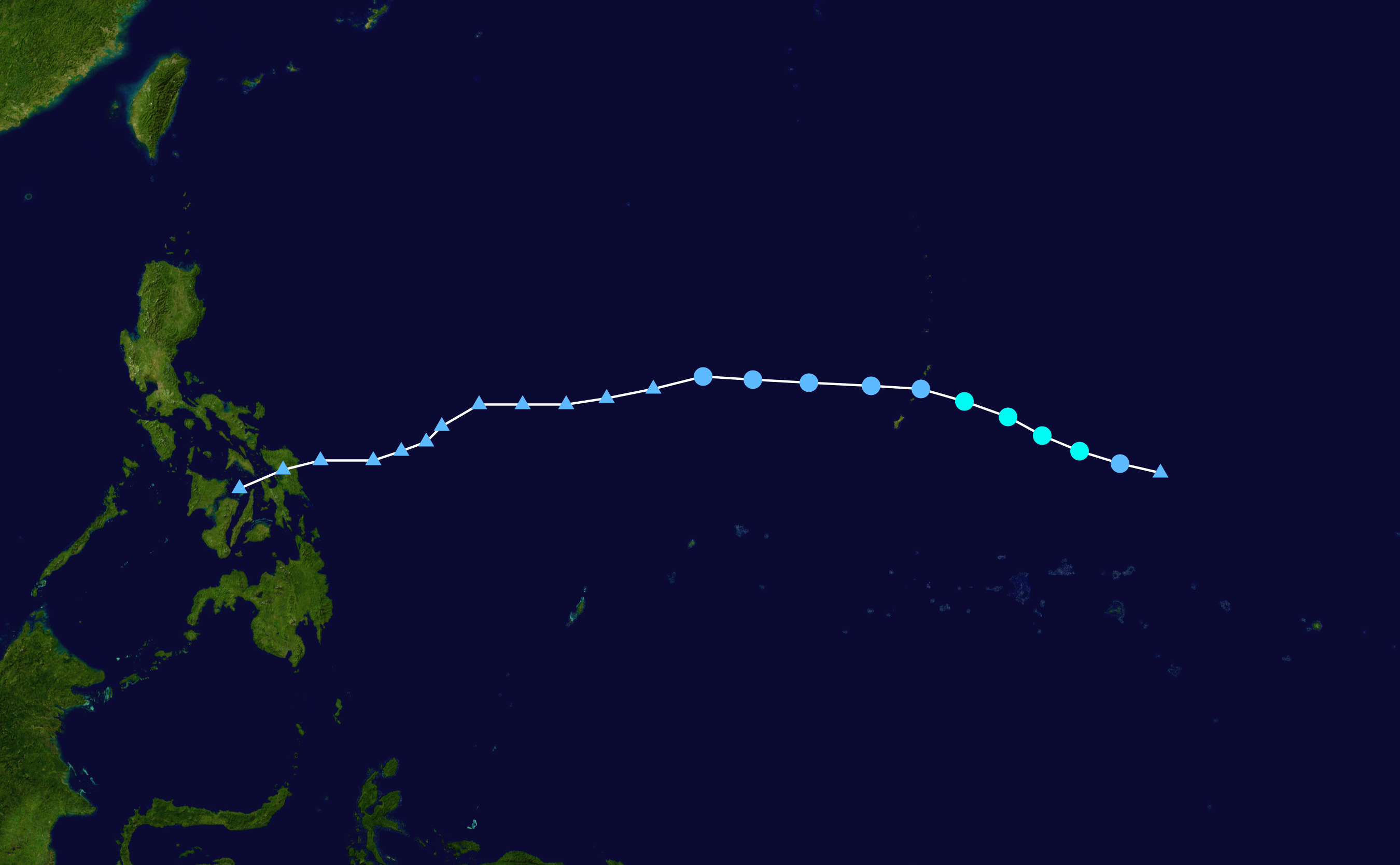
- Duration: September 16 – September 19
- Peak intensity: 75 km/h (45 mph) (1-min); 1002 hPa (mbar)

=== CMA Tropical Depression 23 ===
- Tropical depression (JMA)
- Tropical depression (SSHWS)
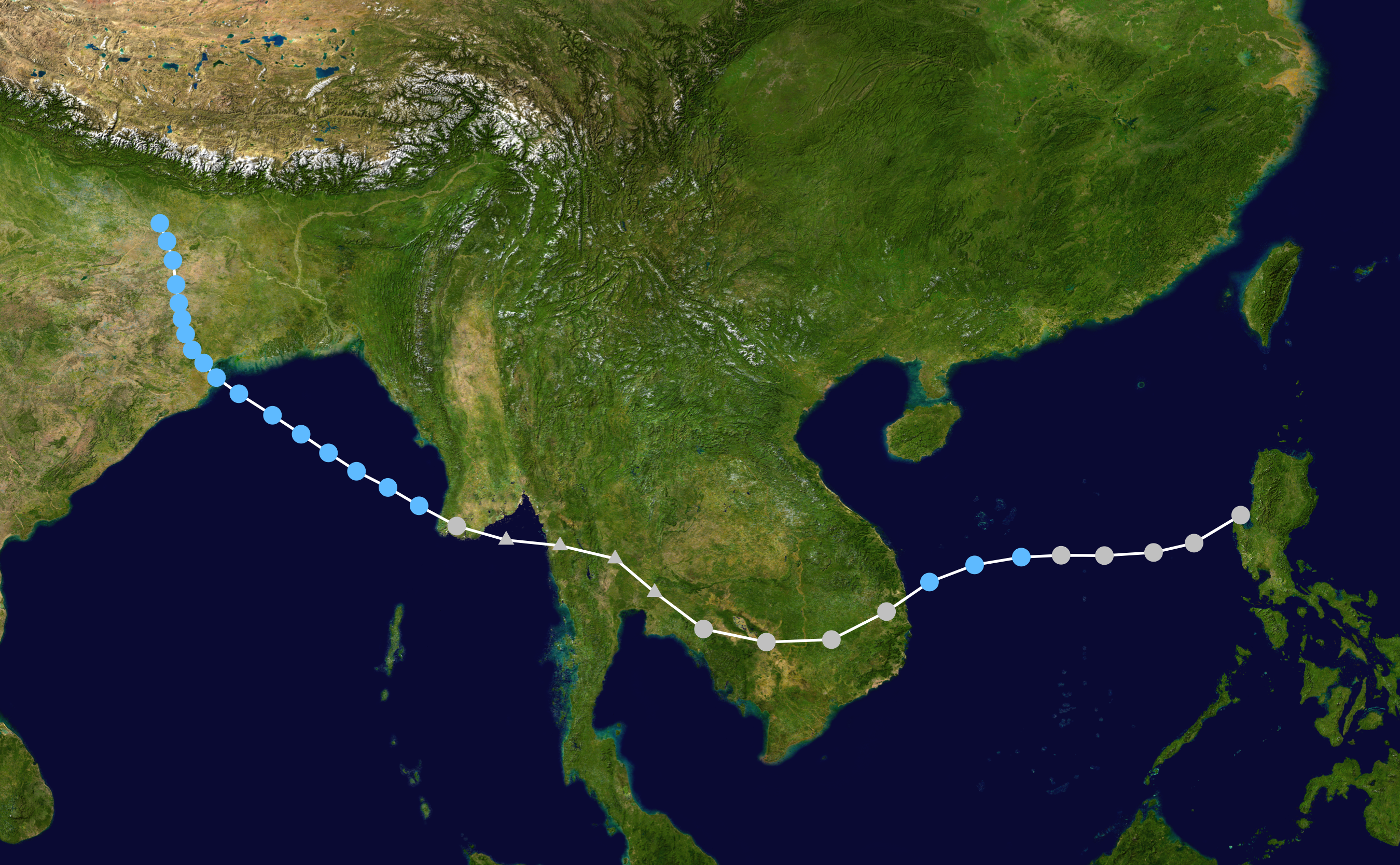
- Duration: September 20 – September 24
- Peak intensity: 45 km/h (30 mph) (10-min); 1004 hPa (mbar)

This tropical depression hit Vietnam in late September and crossed into the Northern Indian Ocean, reforming as Deep Depression Nine.

=== Typhoon Judy ===
- Typhoon (JMA)
- Category 5-equivalent super typhoon (SSHWS)
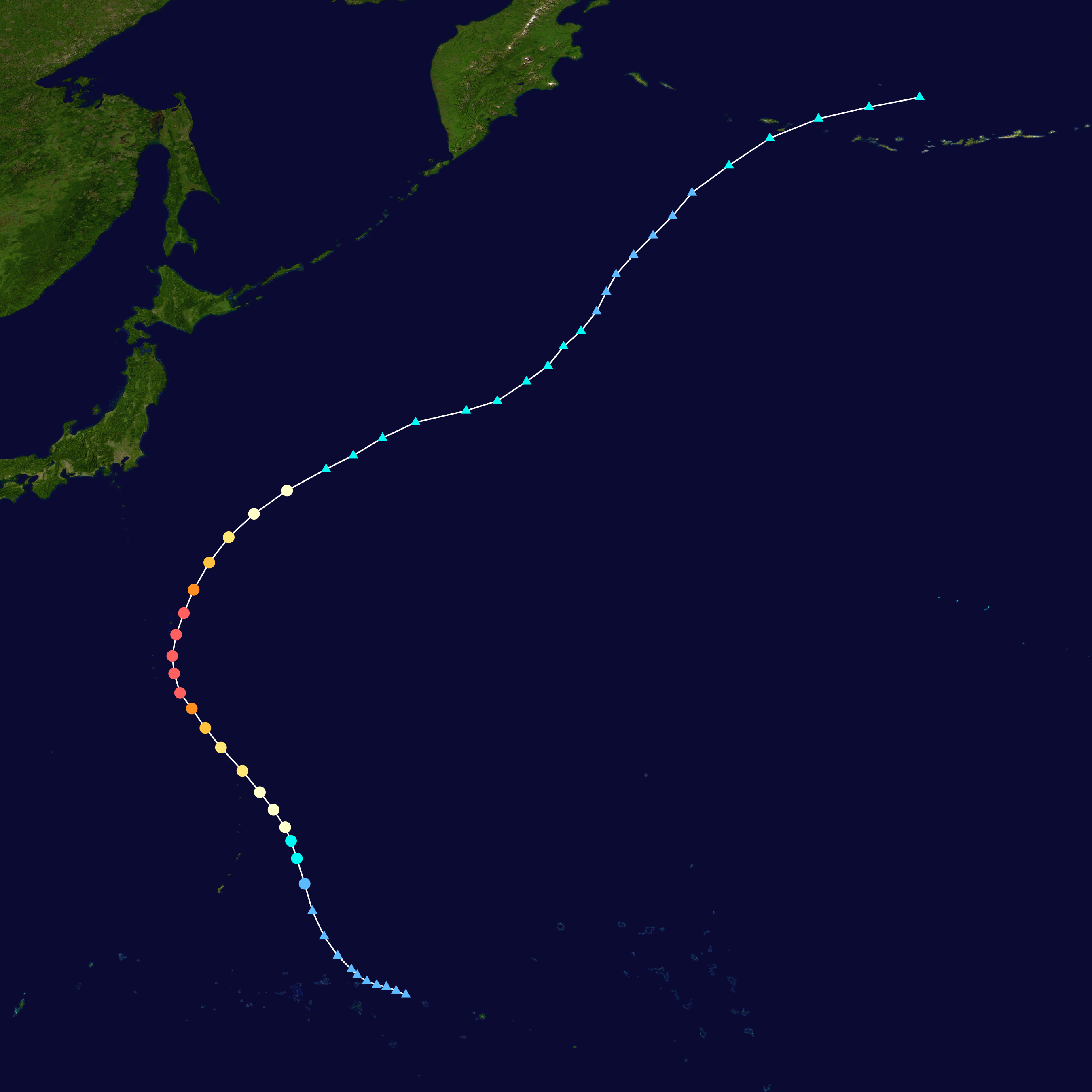
- Duration: September 27 – October 4
- Peak intensity: 280 km/h (175 mph) (1-min); 920 hPa (mbar)

=== CMA Tropical Depression 25 ===
- Tropical depression (CMA)
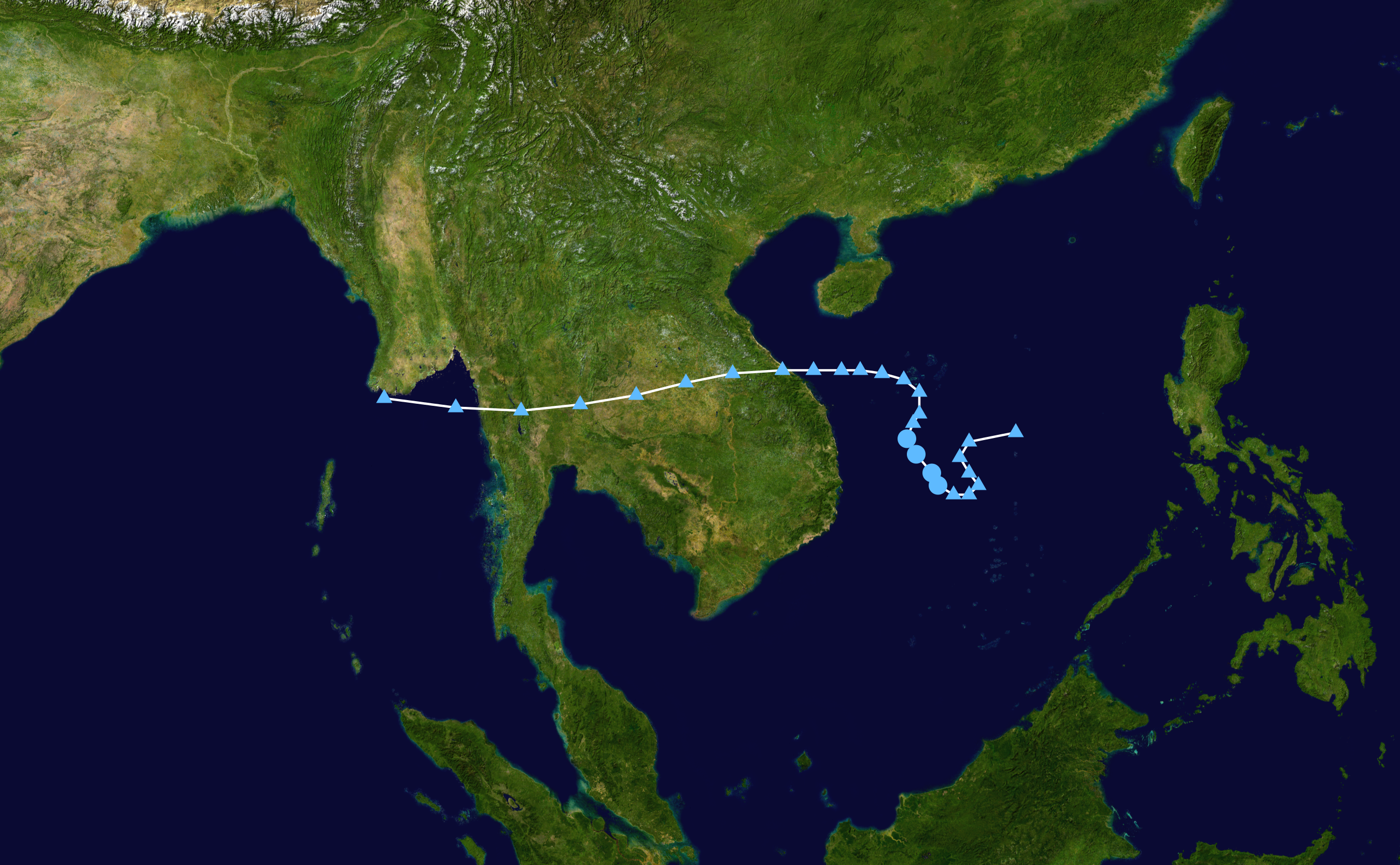
- Duration: October 2 – October 3
- Peak intensity: 45 km/h (30 mph) (10-min); 1005 hPa (mbar)

=== Typhoon Kit (Rosing) ===
- Typhoon (JMA)
- Category 4-equivalent typhoon (SSHWS)
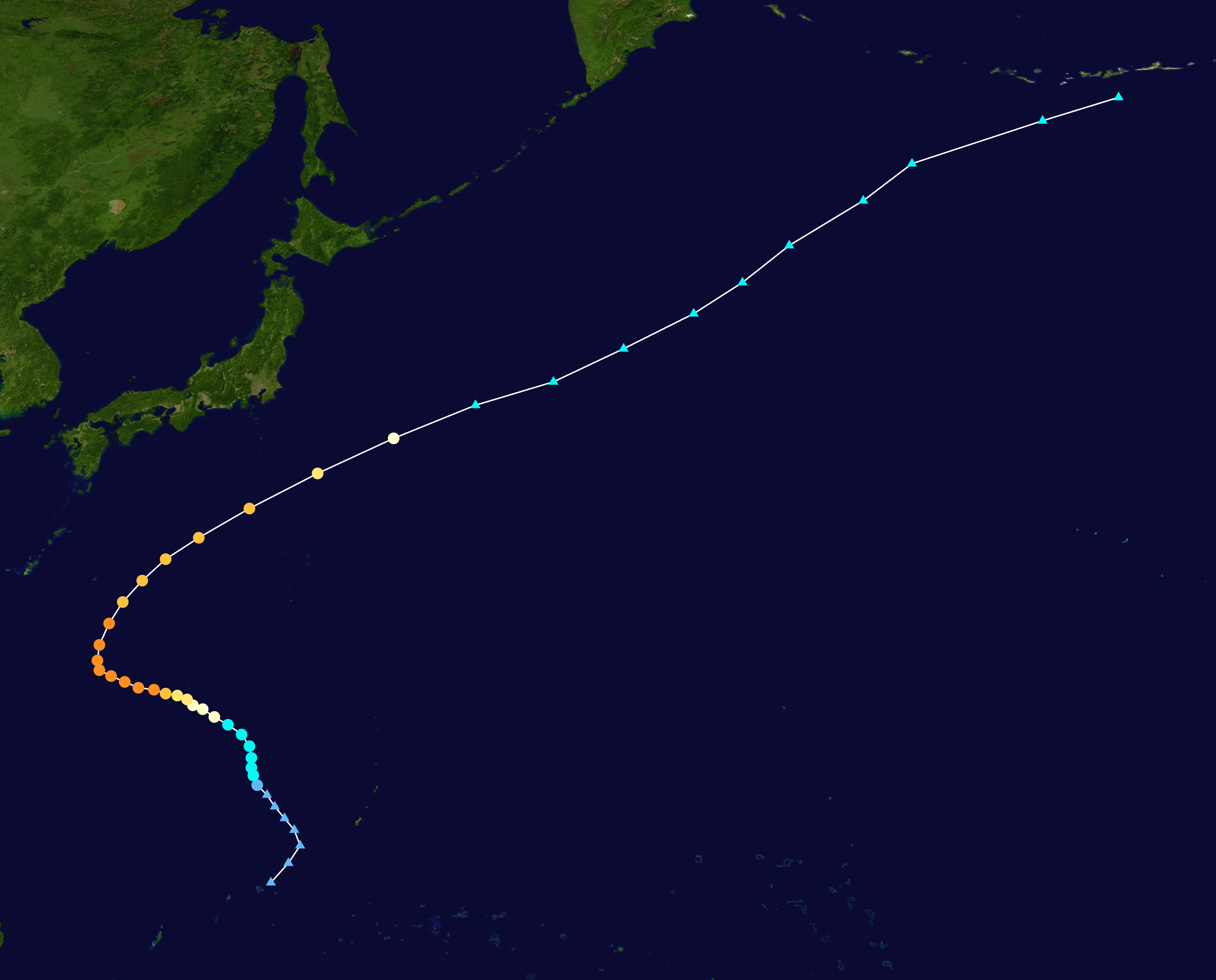
- Duration: October 3 – October 11
- Peak intensity: 250 km/h (155 mph) (1-min); 930 hPa (mbar)

=== Typhoon Lola ===
- Typhoon (JMA)
- Category 4-equivalent typhoon (SSHWS)
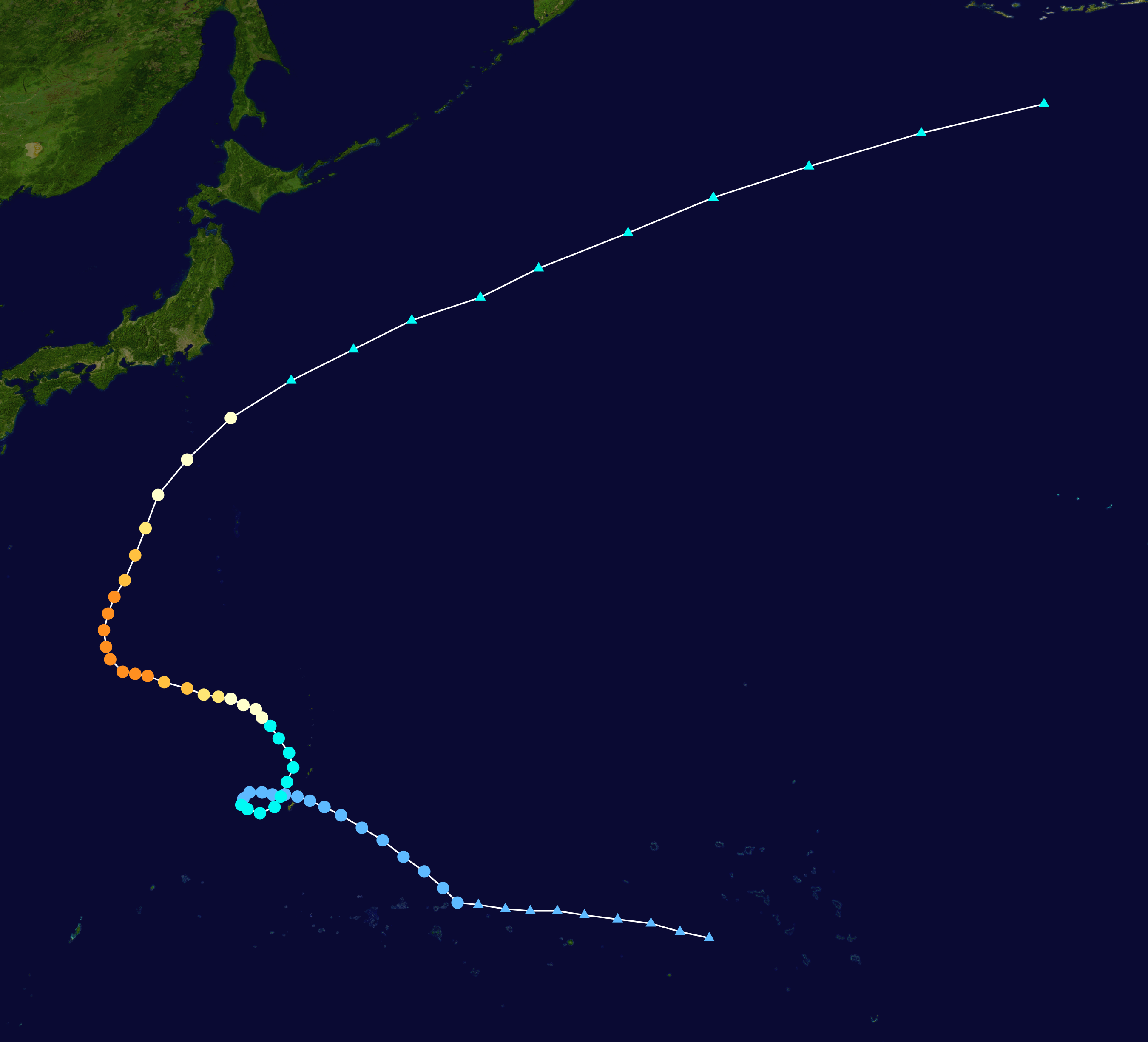
- Duration: October 6 – October 19
- Peak intensity: 240 km/h (150 mph) (1-min); 943 hPa (mbar)

=== Typhoon Mamie ===
- Typhoon (JMA)
- Category 3-equivalent typhoon (SSHWS)
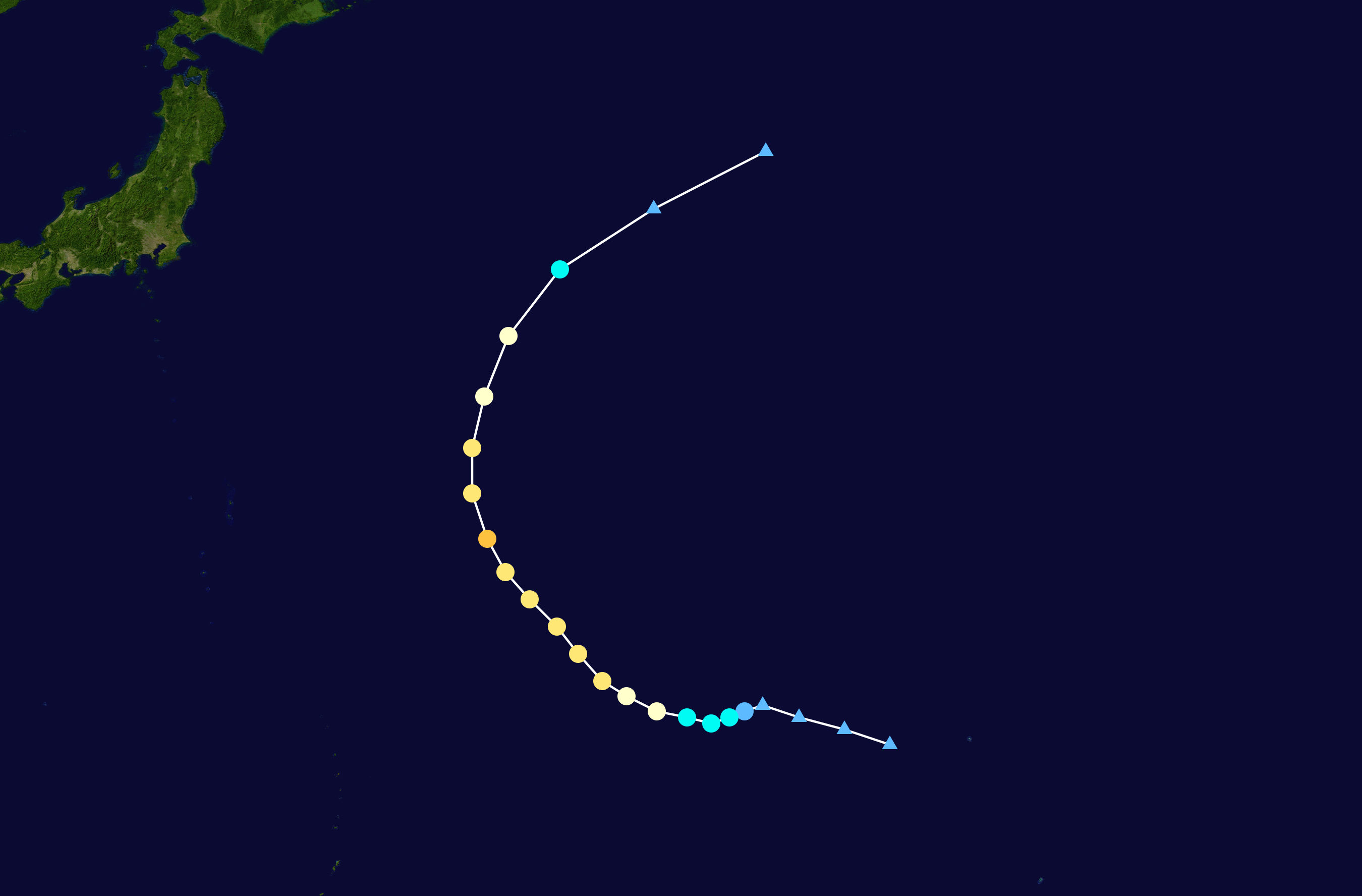
- Duration: October 13 – October 18
- Peak intensity: 185 km/h (115 mph) (1-min); 965 hPa (mbar)

=== Tropical Depression Nina ===
- Tropical depression (JMA)
- Tropical storm (SSHWS)
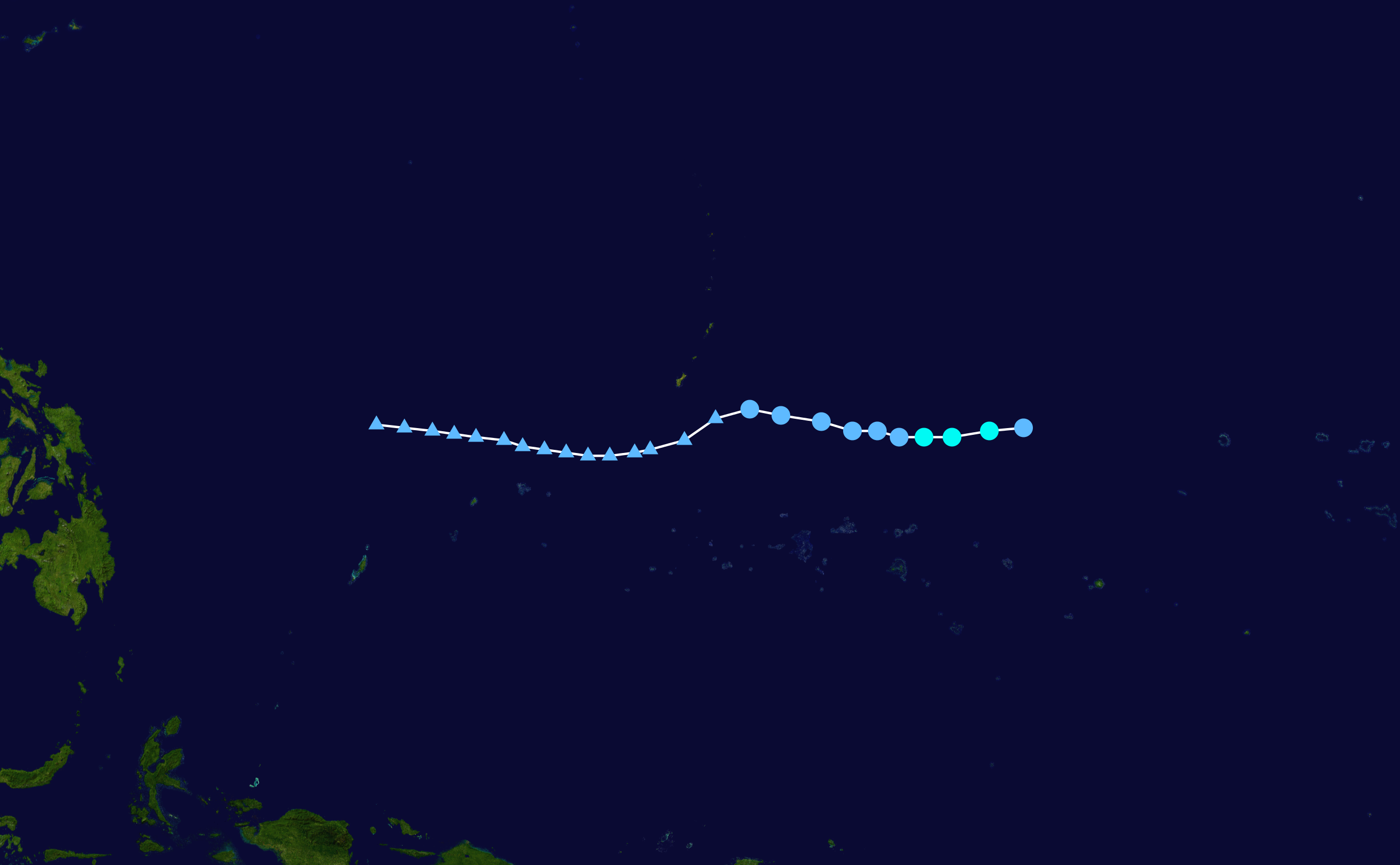
- Duration: October 18 – October 20
- Peak intensity: 75 km/h (45 mph) (1-min); 1000 hPa (mbar)

=== Typhoon Ora ===
- Typhoon (JMA)
- Category 1-equivalent typhoon (SSHWS)
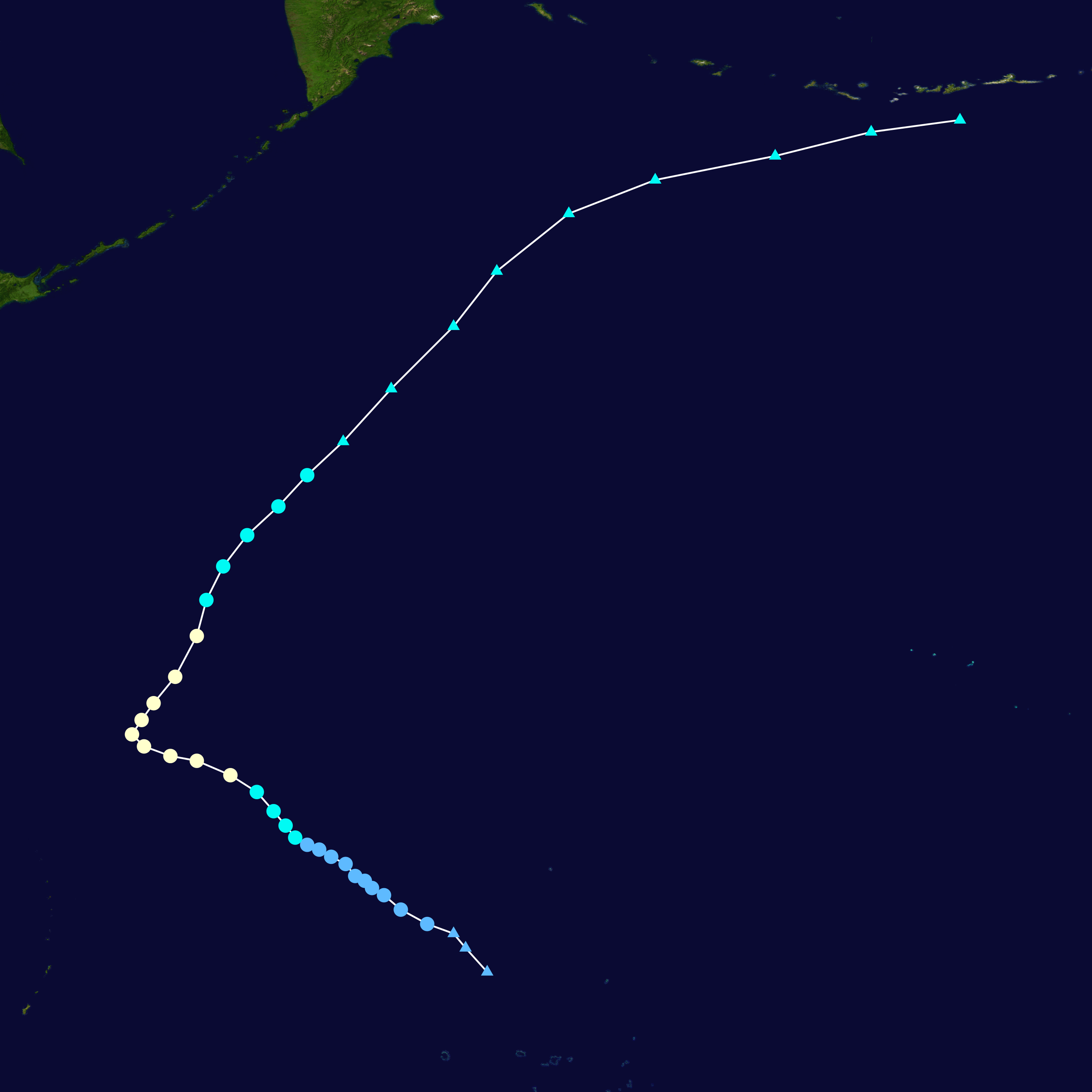
- Duration: October 22 – October 30
- Peak intensity: 150 km/h (90 mph) (1-min); 985 hPa (mbar)

=== Tropical Storm Phyllis (Sisang) ===
- Tropical storm (JMA)
- Category 1-equivalent typhoon (SSHWS)
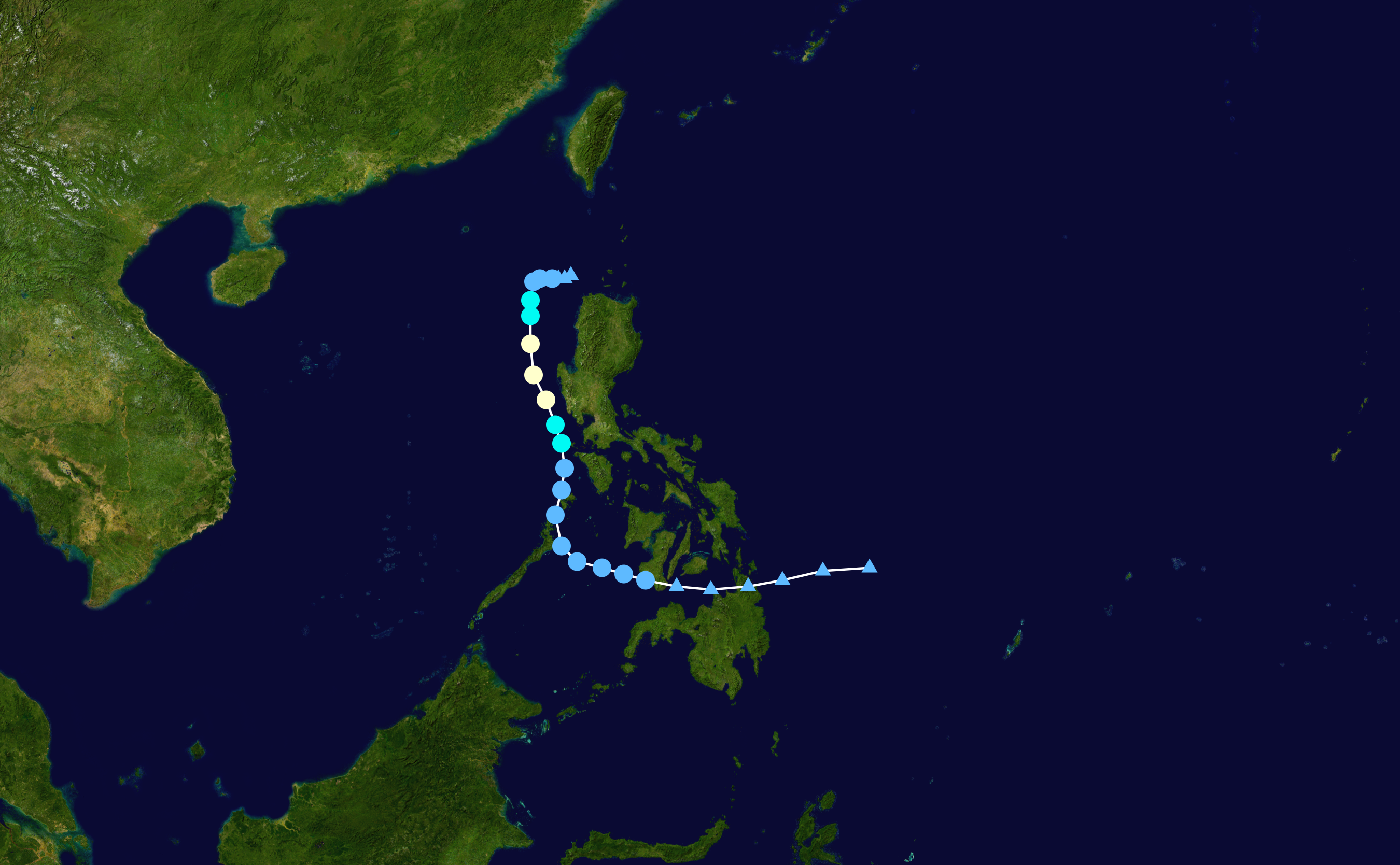
- Duration: December 8 – December 15
- Peak intensity: 140 km/h (85 mph) (1-min); 994 hPa (mbar)

=== Typhoon Rita (Trining) ===
- Typhoon (JMA)
- Tropical storm (SSHWS)
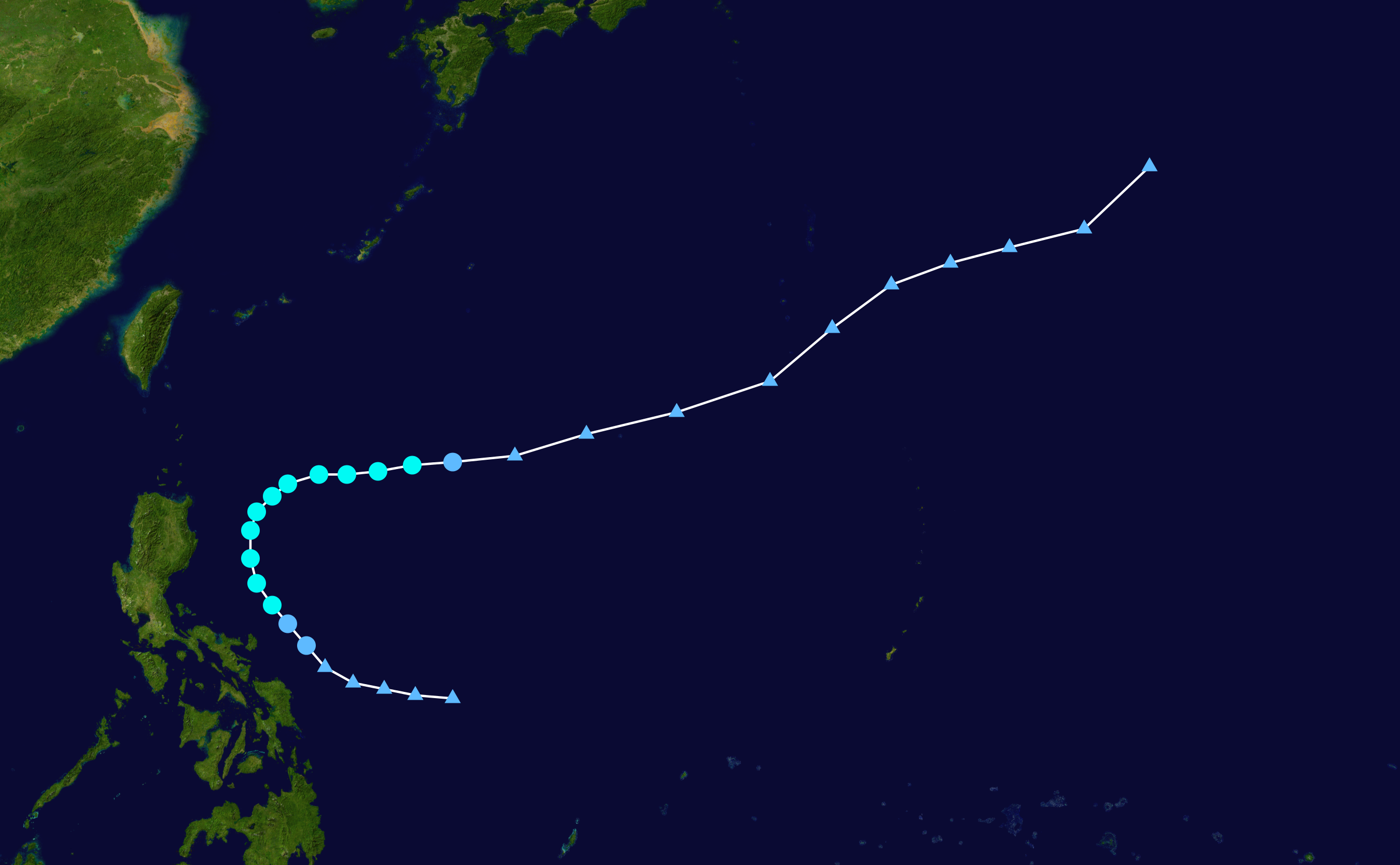
- Duration: December 15 – December 19
- Peak intensity: 75 km/h (45 mph) (1-min); 998 hPa (mbar)

=== Typhoon Susan ===
- Typhoon (JMA)
- Category 4-equivalent typhoon (SSHWS)
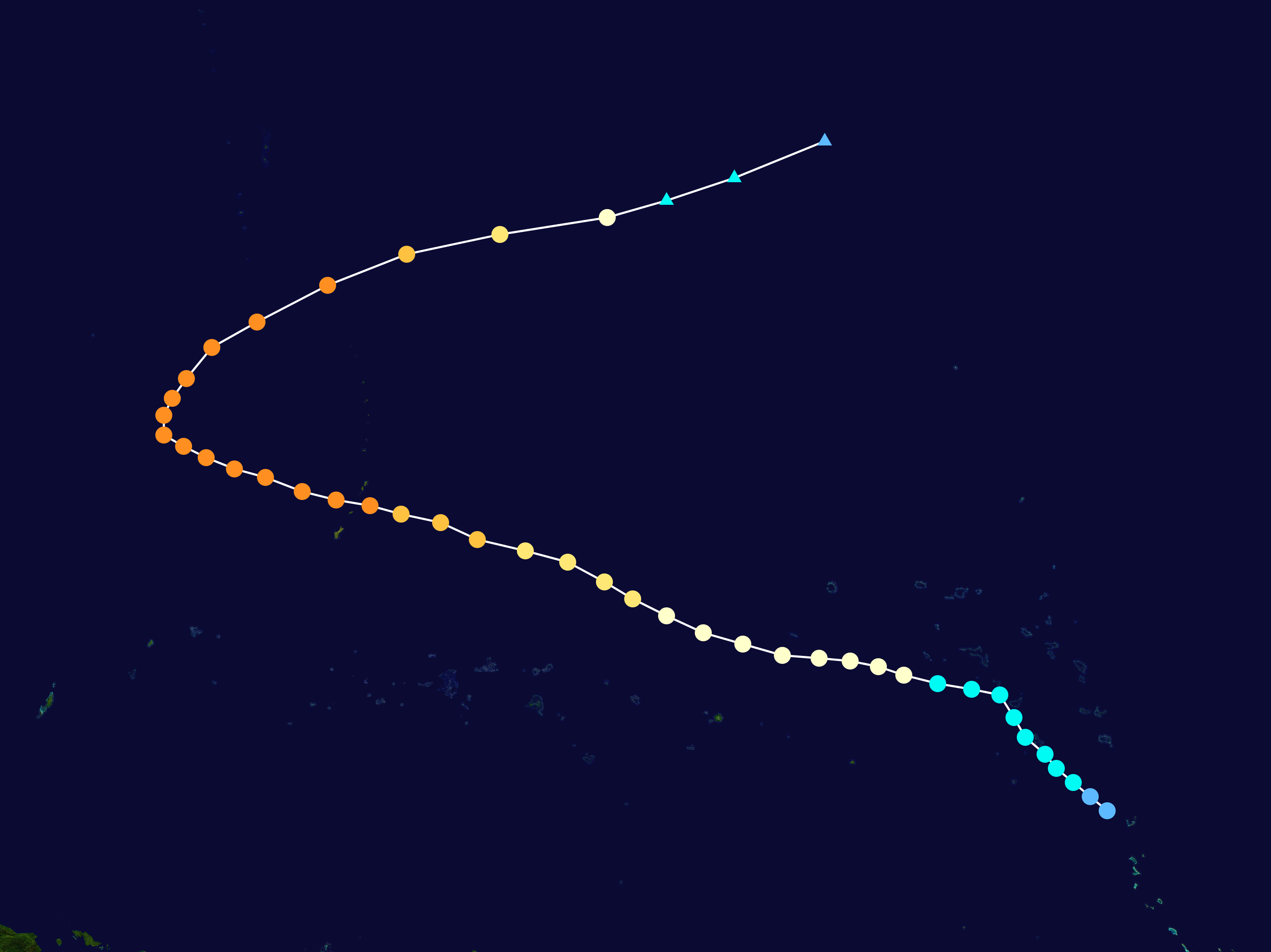
- Duration: December 18 – December 28
- Peak intensity: 250 km/h (155 mph) (1-min); 935 hPa (mbar)

Susan didn't hit any land.

== Storm names ==
=== International ===
- Agnes 18W
- Bess 20W
- Carmen 23W
- Della 25W
- Elaine 27W
- Faye 28W
- Gloria 29W
- Hester 30W
- Irma 32W
- Judy 34W
- Kit 35W
- Lola 36W
- Mamie 37W
- Nina 38W
- Ora 39W
- Phyllis 41W
- Rita 42W
- Susan 43W
- Tess
- Viola
- Winnie
- Alice
- Betty
- Cora
- Doris
- Elsie
- Flossie
- Grace
- Helen
- Ida
- June
- Kathy
- Lorna
- Marie
- Nancy
- Olga
- Pamela
- Ruby
- Sally
- Tilda
- Violet
- Wilda
- Anita
- Billie
- Clara
- Dot
- Ellen
- Fran
- Georgia
- Hope
- Iris
- Joan
- Kate
- Louise
- Marge
- Nora
- Opal
- Patsy
- Ruth
- Sarah
- Thelma
- Vera
- Wanda
- Amy
- Babe
- Carla
- Dinah
- Emma
- Freda
- Gilda
- Harriet
- Ivy
- Jean
- Kim
- Lucy
- Mary
- Nadine
- Olive 5W
- Polly 9W
- Rose 10W
- Shirley 11W
- Trix 12W
- Virginia 15W
- Wendy 16W

=== Philippines ===
Auring	Bebeng	Karing	Diding	Etang
Gening	Herming	Ising	Luding	Mameng
Neneng	Oniang	Pepang	Rosing	Sisang
Trining	Uring (unused)	Welming (unused)	Yayang (unused)	
Auxiliary list
				Ading (unused)
Barang (unused)	Krising (unused)	Dadang (unused)	Erling (unused)	Goying (unused)

The Philippine Atmospheric, Geophysical and Astronomical Services Administration uses its own naming scheme for tropical cyclones in their area of responsibility. PAGASA assigns names to tropical depressions that form within their area of responsibility and any tropical cyclone that might move into their area of responsibility. Should the list of names for a given year prove to be insufficient, names are taken from an auxiliary list, the first 10 of which are published each year before the season starts. Names not retired from this list will be used again in the 1967 season. PAGASA uses its own naming scheme that starts in the Filipino alphabet, with names of Filipino female names ending with "ng" (A, B, K, D, etc.). This was the first season in which PAGASA assigned local names to typhoons. Names that were not assigned/going to use are marked in gray.

== See also ==
- 1963 Atlantic hurricane season
- 1963 Pacific hurricane season
- 1963 North Indian Ocean cyclone season
