= List of storms named Giselle =

The name Giselle or Gisele has been used for two tropical cyclones and one extratropical cyclone worldwide.

In the South-West Indian Ocean:

- Cyclone Giselle (1964), a Category 3 tropical cyclone that passed to the south of Madagascar.

In the Australian region:

- Cyclone Giselle (1968), a violent storm that was partially responsible for capsizing the TEV Wahine.

In Europe:

- Storm Gisele (2018), caused at least one tornado while making landfall in Portugal.
