= 1963 Pacific hurricane season =

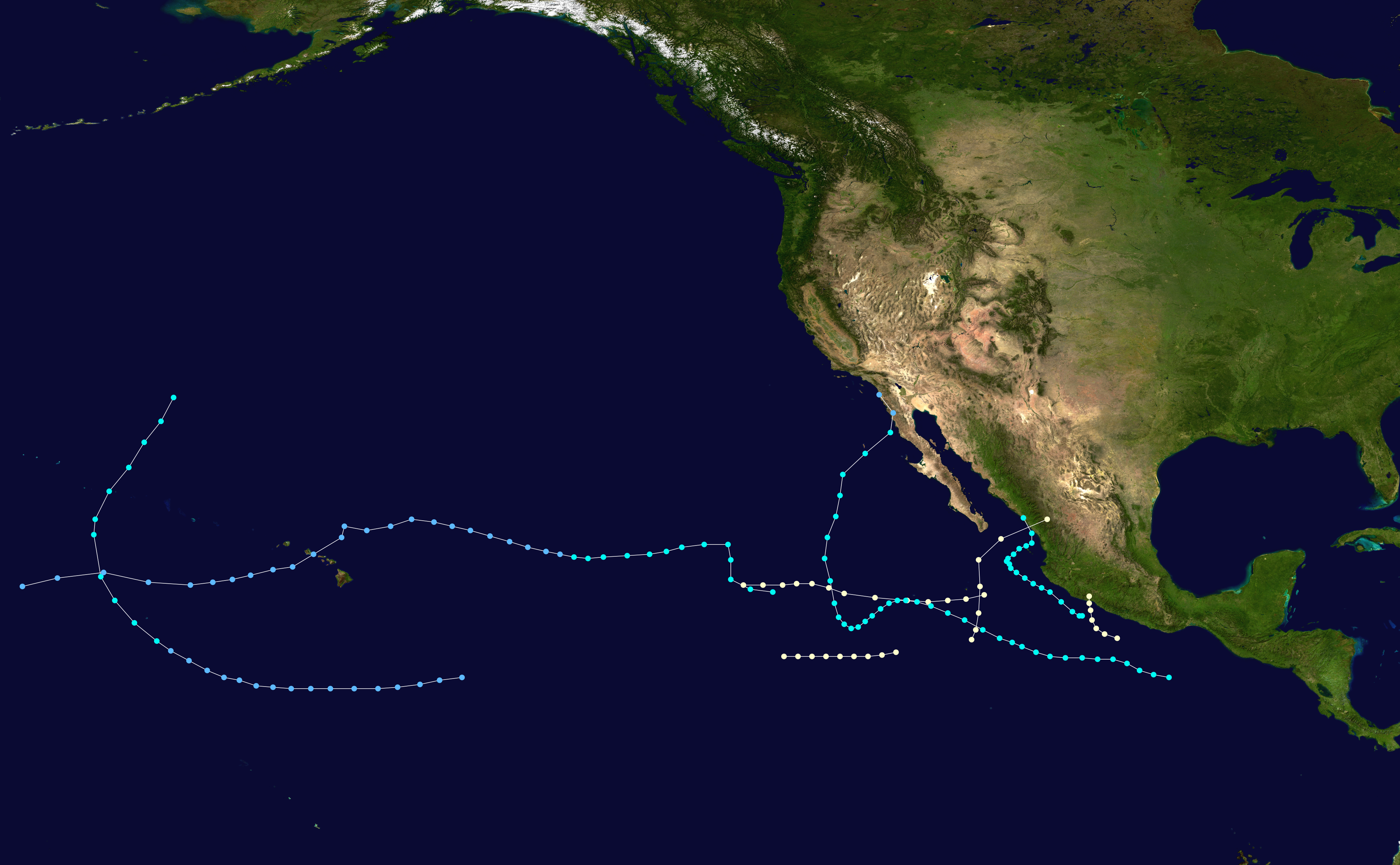
- Season summary map

Seasonal boundaries
- First system formed: July 14, 1963
- Last system dissipated: October 14, 1963

Strongest storm
- Name: Mona
  - Maximum winds: 85 mph (140 km/h) (1-minute sustained)
  - Lowest pressure: 961 mbar (hPa; 28.38 inHg)

Seasonal statistics
- Total depressions: 8
- Total storms: 8
- Hurricanes: 4
- Total fatalities: Unknown
- Total damage: Unknown

Related articles
- 1963 Atlantic hurricane season; 1963 Pacific typhoon season; 1963 North Indian Ocean cyclone season

The 1963 Pacific hurricane season was a below-average season, with 8 storms and 4 hurricanes forming. The season ran through the summer and fall of 1963.

The strongest of these storms were Glenda and Mona, which both had 85 mph (135 km/h) winds. The first storm, Emily, made landfall near Manzanillo, Mexico as a Category 1 hurricane. The next hurricanes, Florence and Glenda, stayed far away from land. Jennifer-Katherine made landfall on Baja California as a tropical depression on September 18. Tropical Storm Irah affected Hawaii as a tropical depression. An unnamed tropical storm curved round Hawaii from 2–8 August. Lillian became post-tropical shortly before making landfall on September 29 with winds of 50 mph. Mona, the final storm of the season made landfall around about the same area as Lillian did with winds of 85 mph.

== Systems ==
=== Hurricane Emily ===
- Category 1 hurricane (SSHWS)
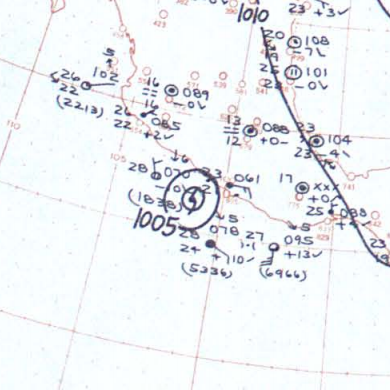
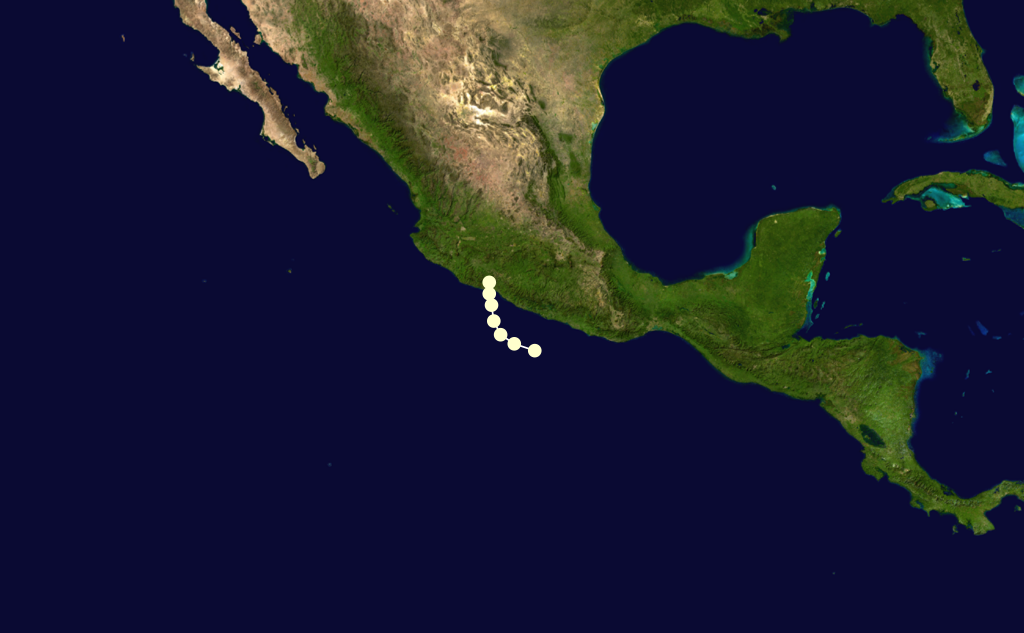
- Duration: June 29 – June 30
- Peak intensity: 85 mph (140 km/h) (1-min); 996 mbar (hPa)

Hurricane Emily formed on June 29, while moving west. It then turned to the north and dissipated over the mountainous regions of Mexico.

=== Hurricane Florence ===
- Category 1 hurricane (SSHWS)
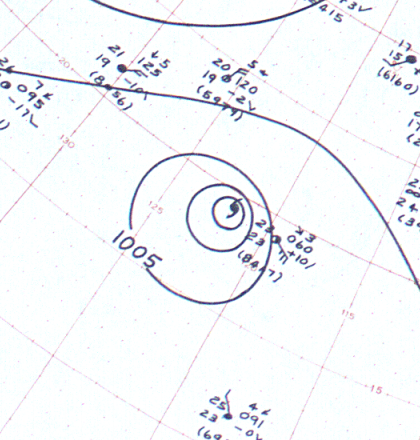
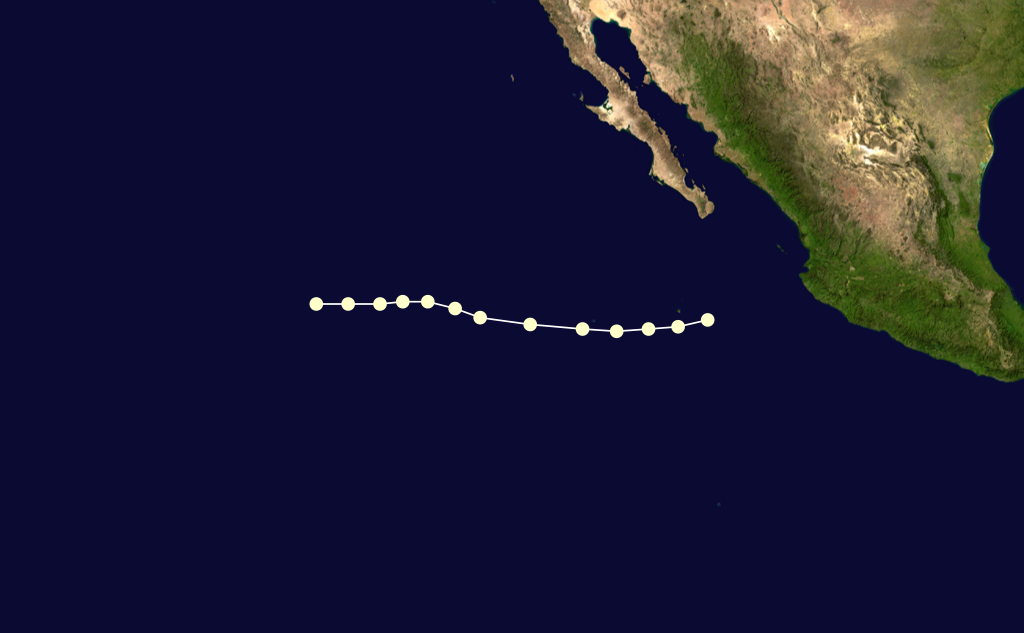
- Duration: July 14 – July 17
- Peak intensity: 85 mph (140 km/h) (1-min); 992 mbar (hPa)

Hurricane Florence followed a nearly-due west track, as it persisted to move away from land, and eventually weakened and dissipated without any effects on a landmass.

=== Hurricane Glenda ===
- Category 1 hurricane (SSHWS)
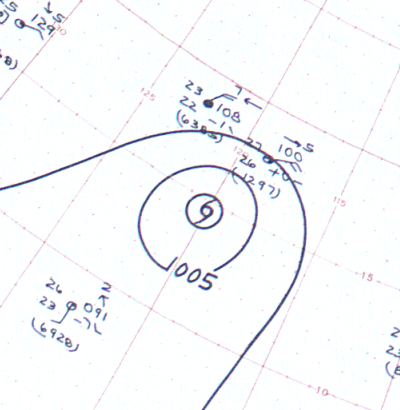
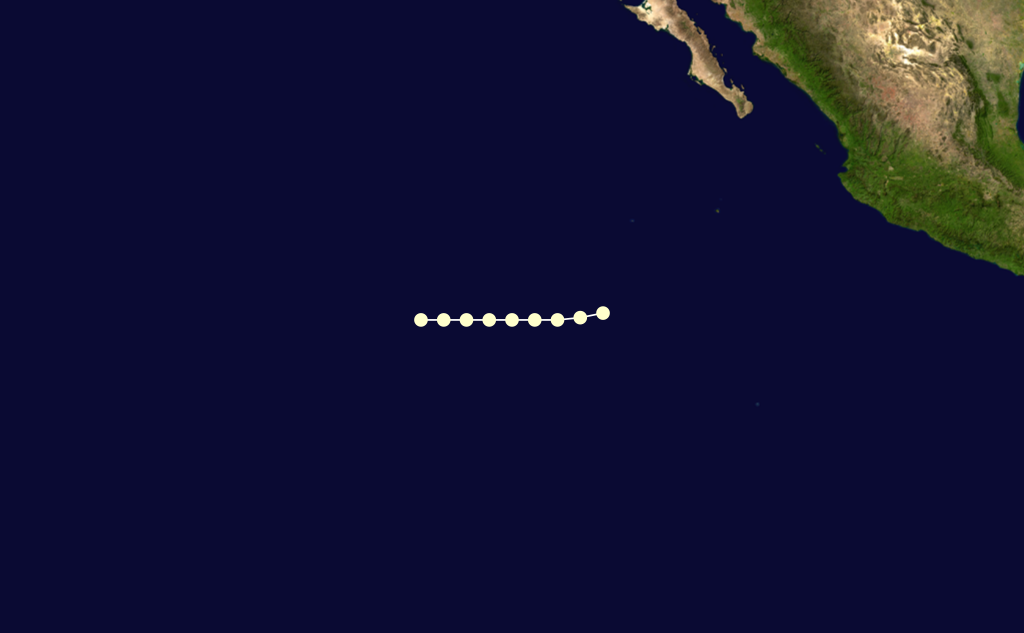
- Duration: July 19 – July 21
- Peak intensity: 85 mph (140 km/h) (1-min); 997 mbar (hPa)

Hurricane Glenda stayed at sea.

=== Tropical Storm Four ===
- Tropical storm (SSHWS)
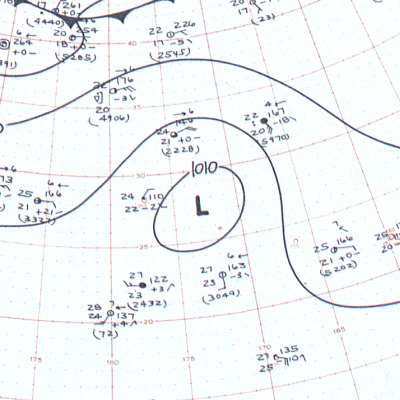
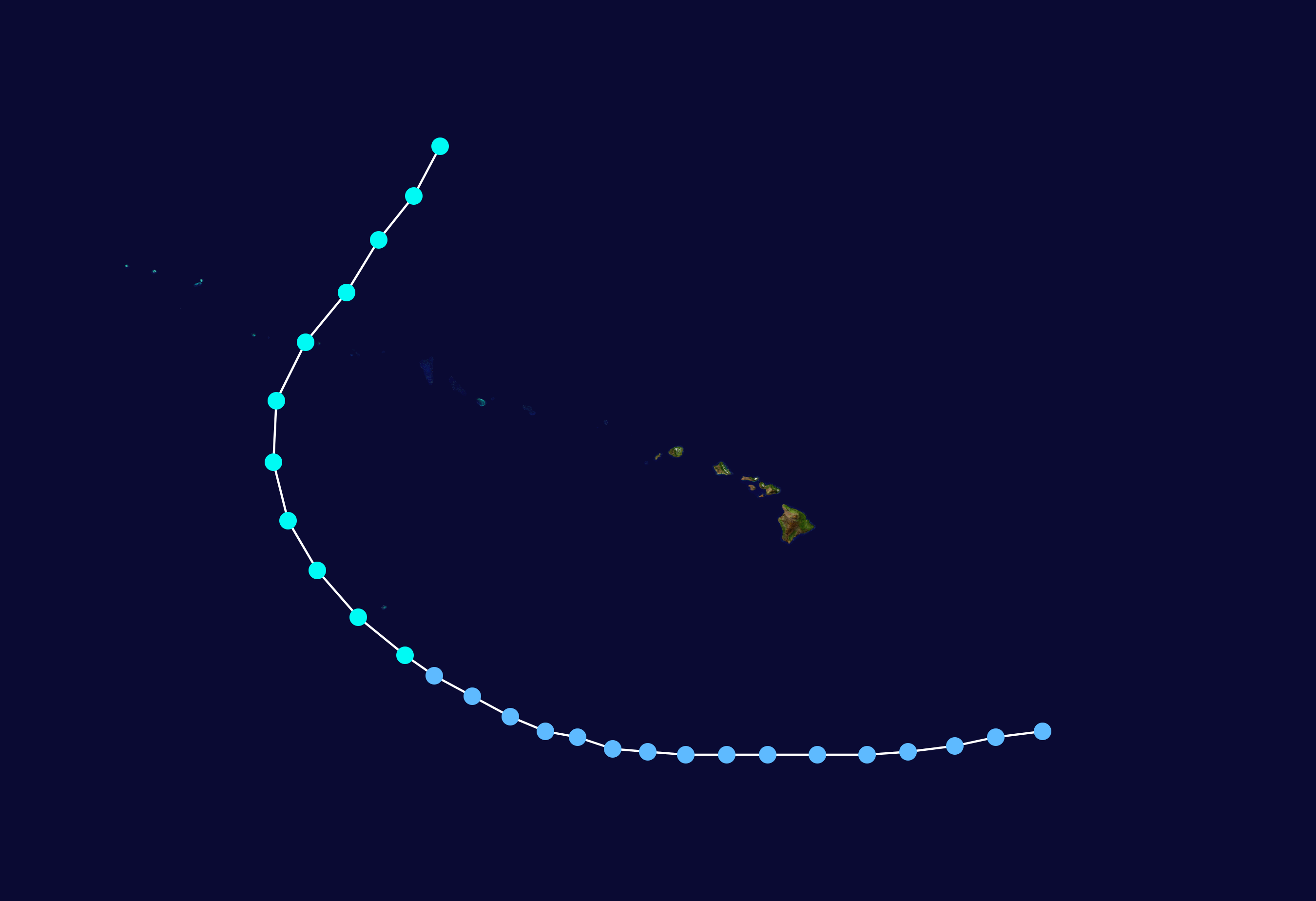
- Duration: August 2 – August 8
- Peak intensity: 50 mph (85 km/h) (1-min);

Tropical Storm Four stayed over the ocean. Several vessels encountered gale-force winds in this storm from the 8th through the 10th as it proceeded northward across the shipping lanes. On August 12, the remnants of the cyclone dissipated near 50N 165W.

=== Tropical Storm Jennifer–Katherine ===
- Tropical storm (SSHWS)
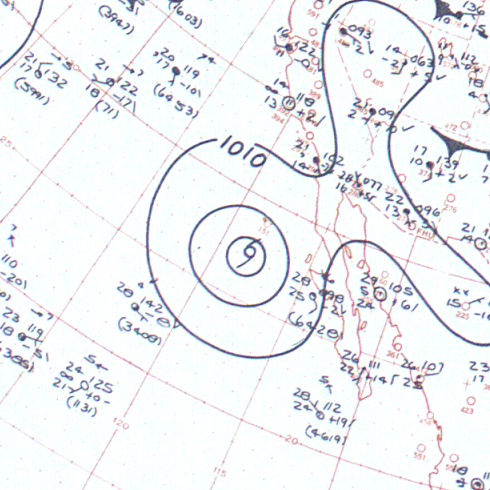
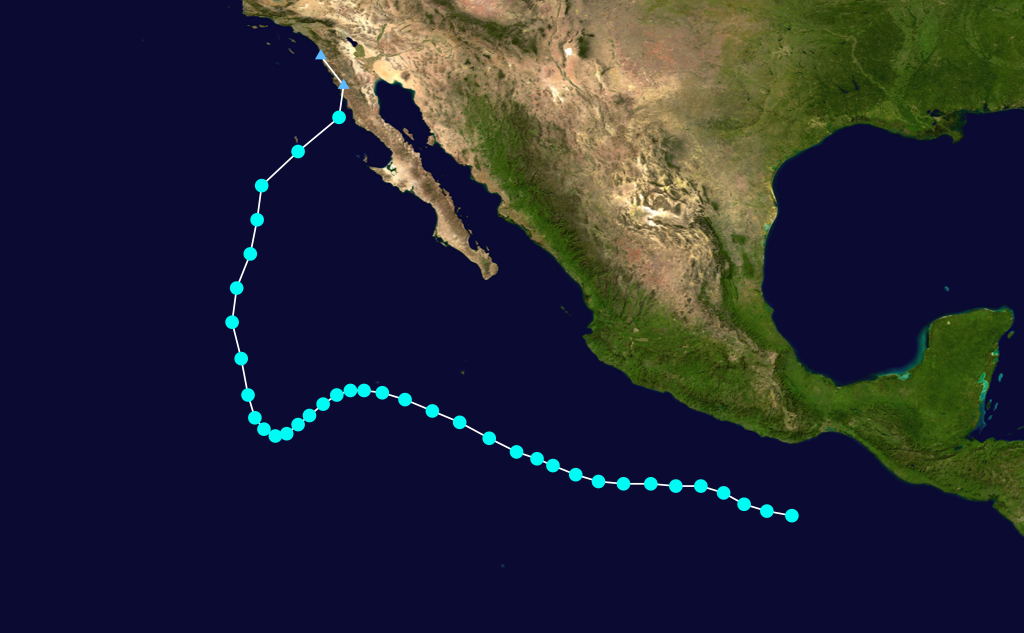
- Duration: September 9 – September 18
- Peak intensity: 50 mph (85 km/h) (1-min); 996 mbar (hPa)

Tropical Storm Jennifer–Katherine moved through the Eastern Pacific in mid-September. It moved northward, and hit Baja California on September 18, bringing heavy rain to Southern California. A total of 6.5 inches (165 mm) fell in the mountains of southern California from the storm. The storm had two names operationally because the NHC had assumed that Jennifer dissipated and that Katherine was a new storm, but reanalysis revealed that it was one storm.

=== Tropical Storm Irah ===
- Tropical storm (SSHWS)
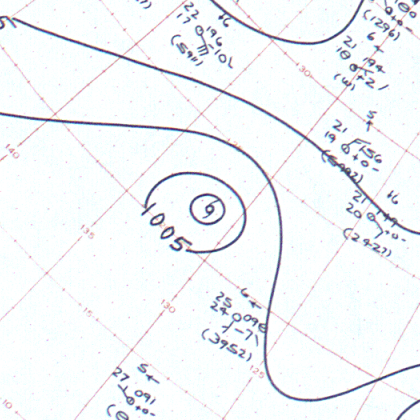
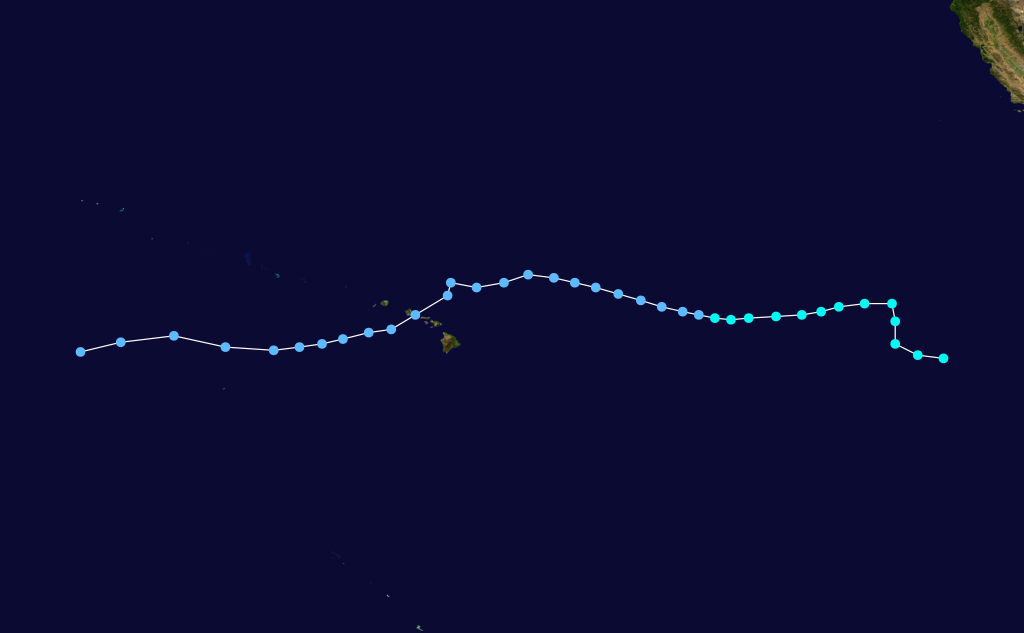
- Duration: September 12 – September 21
- Peak intensity: 50 mph (85 km/h) (1-min); 999 mbar (hPa)

Irah peaked at a tropical storm and made a direct hit on Hawaii as a tropical depression.

=== Tropical Storm Lillian ===
- Tropical storm (SSHWS)
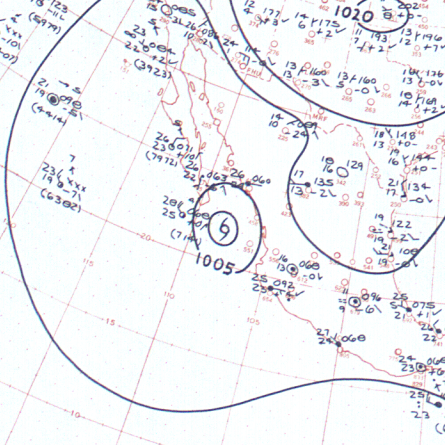
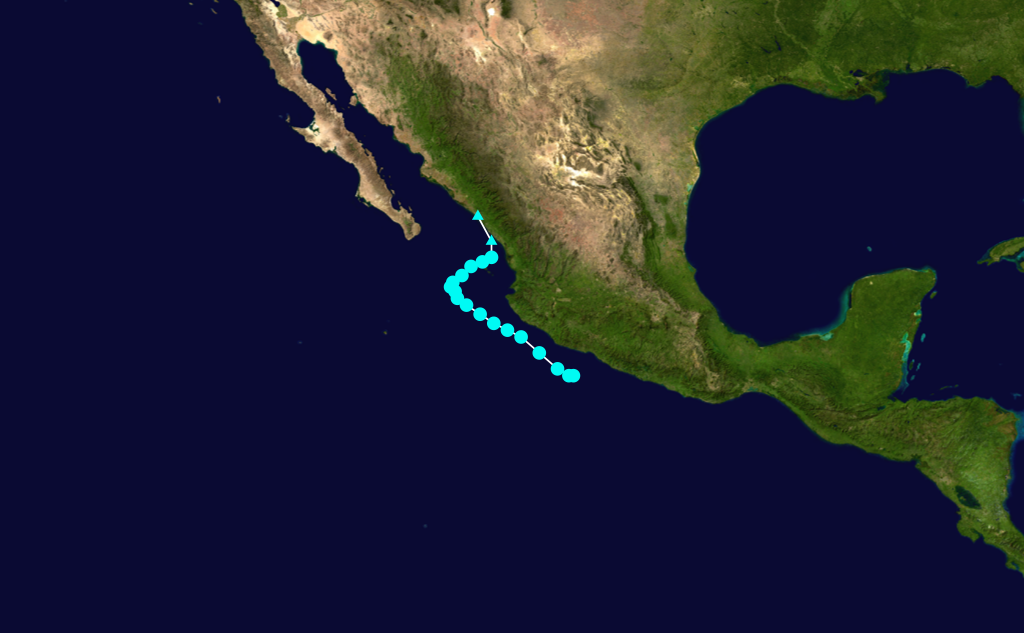
- Duration: September 24 – September 29
- Peak intensity: 50 mph (85 km/h) (1-min); 991 mbar (hPa)

Tropical Storm Lillian paralleled the Mexican coast. It was originally moving to the north-west, but turned to the west-northeast on September 28, before making landfall on Western Mexico as a tropical storm.

=== Hurricane Mona ===
- Category 1 hurricane (SSHWS)
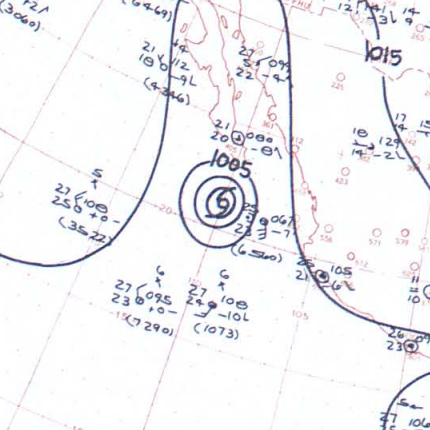
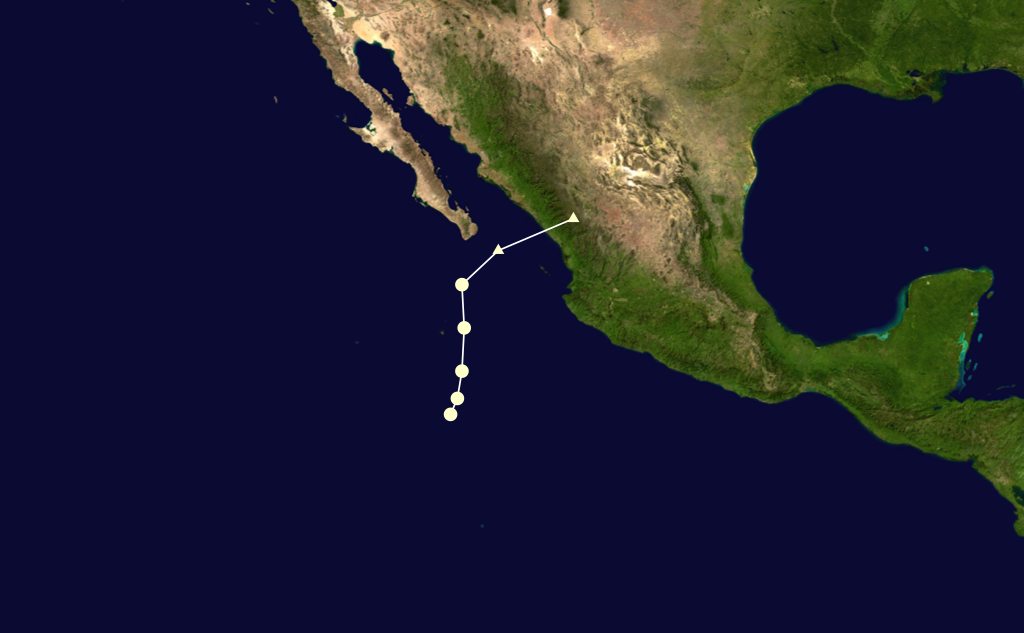
- Duration: October 17 – October 19
- Peak intensity: 85 mph (140 km/h) (1-min); 961 mbar (hPa)

Hurricane Mona hit western Mexico on October 18.

== Storm names ==
The following names were used for tropical storms that formed in the North Pacific Ocean east of 140°W during 1963. The names came from a series of four rotating lists. Names were used one after the other without regard to year, and when the bottom of one list was reached, the next named storm received the name at the top of the next list.

- Emily
- Florence
- Glenda
- Hazel
- Irah
- Jennifer
- Katherine
- Lillian
- Mona

Had any tropical storms formed in the North Pacific between 140°W and the International Date Line in 1963, their names would have been drawn from the Western Pacific typhoon naming list.

== See also ==
- 1963 Atlantic hurricane season
- 1963 Pacific typhoon season
- 1963 North Indian Ocean cyclone season
- Australian region cyclone seasons: 1962–63 1963–64
- South Pacific cyclone seasons: 1962–63 1963–64
- South-West Indian Ocean cyclone seasons: 1962–63 1963–64
