= 1963 North Indian Ocean cyclone season =

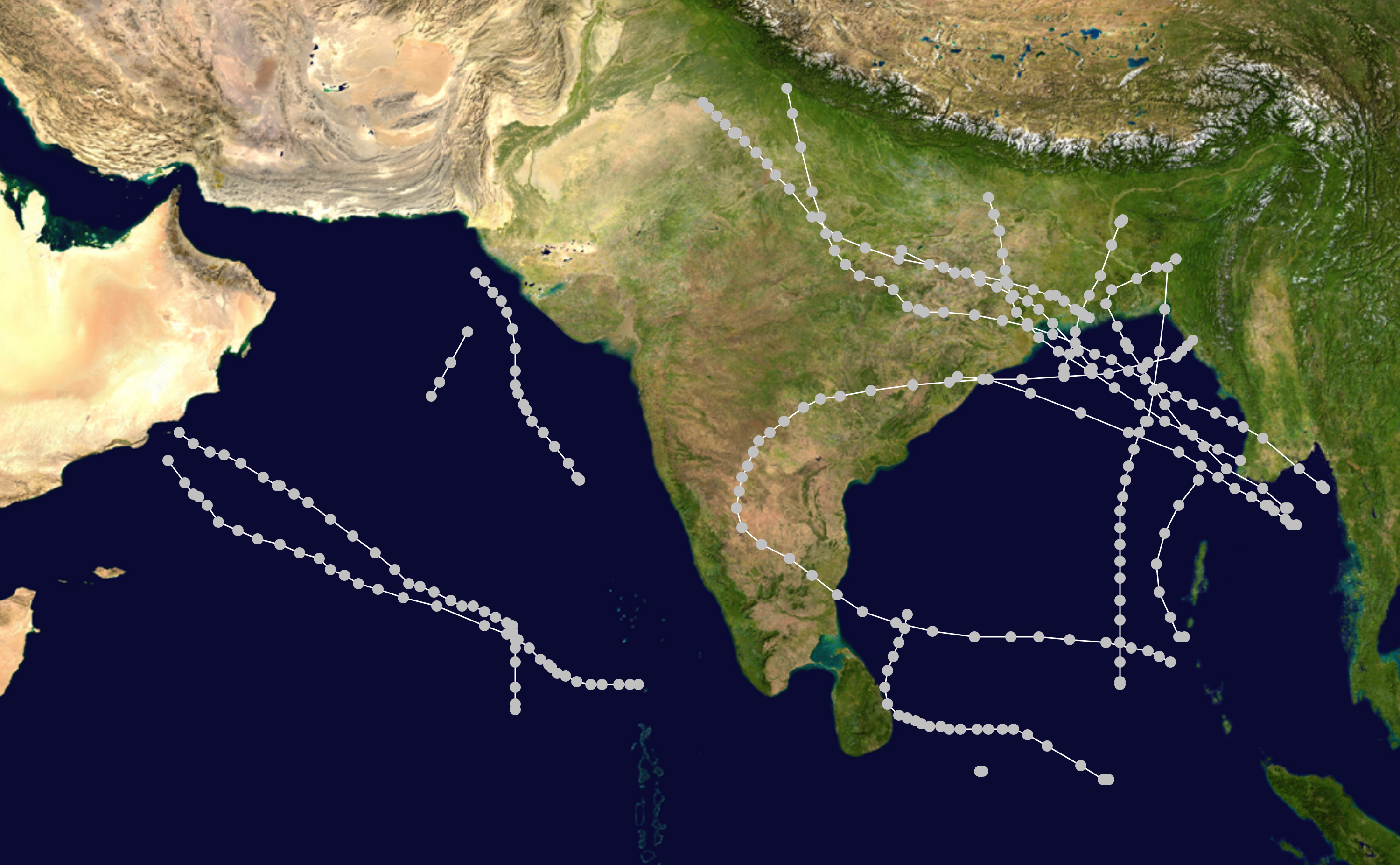
- Season summary map

Seasonal boundaries
- First system formed: January 3, 1963 (record earliest)
- Last system dissipated: December 7, 1963

Strongest storm
- Name: Three
  - Maximum winds: 240 km/h (150 mph)
  - Lowest pressure: 920 hPa (mbar)

Seasonal statistics
- Depressions: 17
- Deep depressions: 11
- Cyclonic storms: 6
- Very severe cyclonic storms: 4
- Total fatalities: At least 11,735
- Total damage: Unknown

Related articles
- 1963 Atlantic hurricane season; 1963 Pacific hurricane season; 1963 Pacific typhoon season

The 1963 North Indian Ocean cyclone season had no bounds, but cyclones tend to form between April and December, with peaks in May and November. These dates conventionally delimit the period of each year when most tropical cyclones form in the northern Indian Ocean. There are two main seas in the North Indian Ocean—the Bay of Bengal to the east of the Indian subcontinent and the Arabian Sea to the west of India. The official Regional Specialized Meteorological Centre in this basin is the India Meteorological Department (IMD), while the Joint Typhoon Warning Center releases unofficial advisories. An average of four to six storms form in the North Indian Ocean every season with peaks in May and November. Cyclones occurring between the meridians 45°E and 100°E are included in the season by the IMD.

== Systems ==
=== Deep Depression One ===
- Deep depression (IMD)
- Tropical depression (SSHWS)
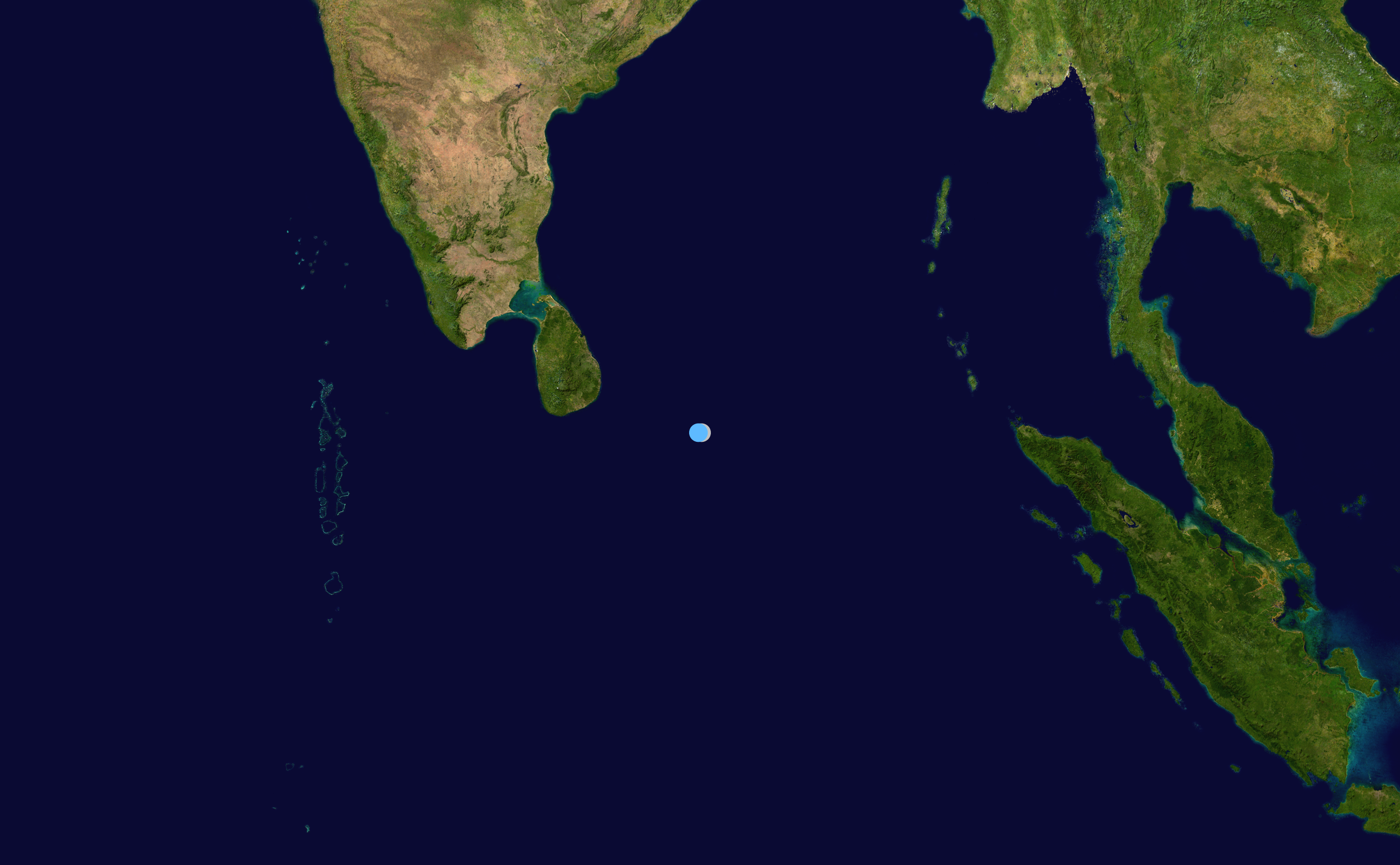
- Duration: January 3 – January 5
- Peak intensity: 45 km/h (30 mph) (3-min);

This tropical depression stalled for three days.

=== Extremely Severe Cyclonic Storm Two ===
- Extremely severe cyclonic storm (IMD)
- Category 1 tropical cyclone (SSHWS)
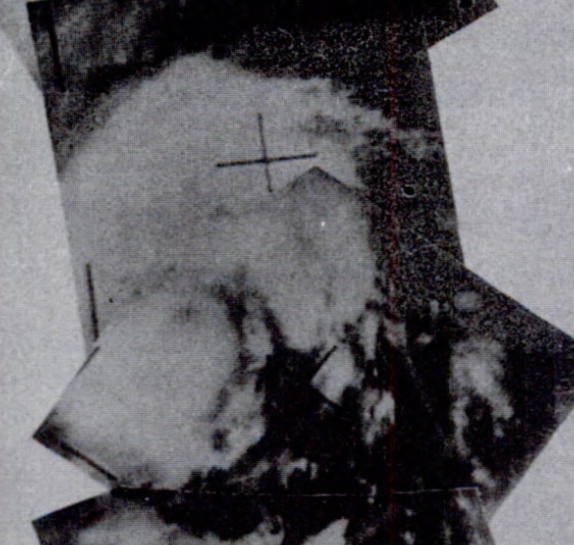
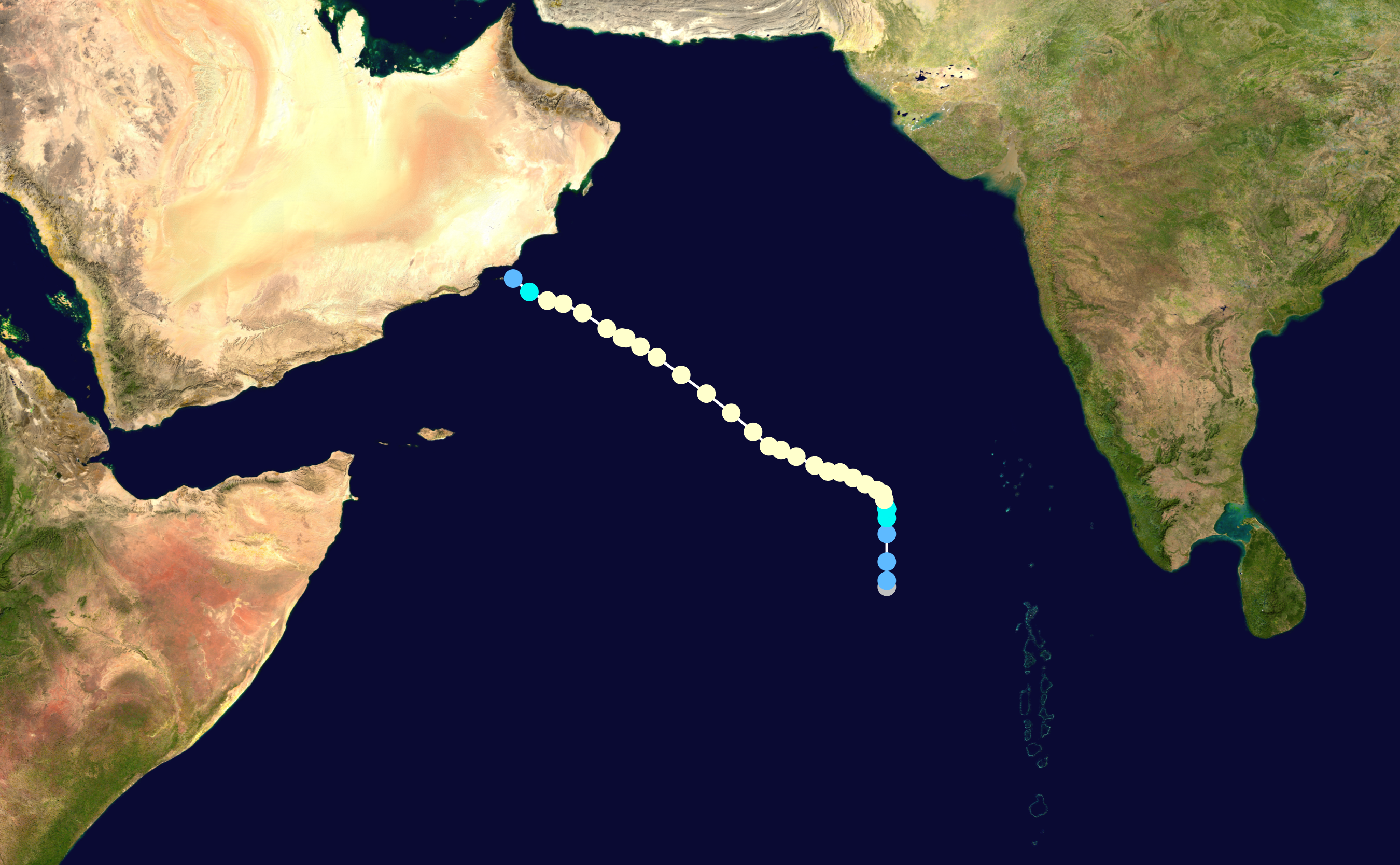
- Duration: May 18 – May 29
- Peak intensity: 195 km/h (120 mph) (3-min); 947 hPa (mbar)

On May 19, a tropical disturbance formed over the Laccadive Islands, before tracking northwest towards the Arabian peninsula. The system achieved cyclone intensity on May 22. On May 24, a United States Weather Bureau reconnaissance aircraft flew into the 19 km (12 mi) eye of the storm, encountering winds of 193 km/h (120 mph). A ship 111 kilometres (69 mi) west of the system reported winds of 68 knots (126 km/h). At Salalah, a strong northerly wind set in during the morning of May 25. Later in the day, winds increased to gale force and a sandstorm reduced visibility to 400 metres (1,300 ft). Later in the day of May 26 winds again increased to gale force and another sandstorm reduced visibility to 500 metres (1,600 ft). As winds increased to 60 knots (110 km/h) the sandstorm became more severe, with visibility restricted to 50 metres (160 ft). Late on the night of the 26th, winds shifted to northeast and heavy rains fell across the region through the morning hours. Skies remained cloudy with periods of rain into May 28. A total of 230 millimetres (9.1 in) was recorded at Salalah.

An estimated 22,000 people were reported to have died, while a further 500,000 were left homeless.

=== Super Cyclonic Storm Three ===
- Super cyclonic storm (IMD)
- Category 4 tropical cyclone (SSHWS)
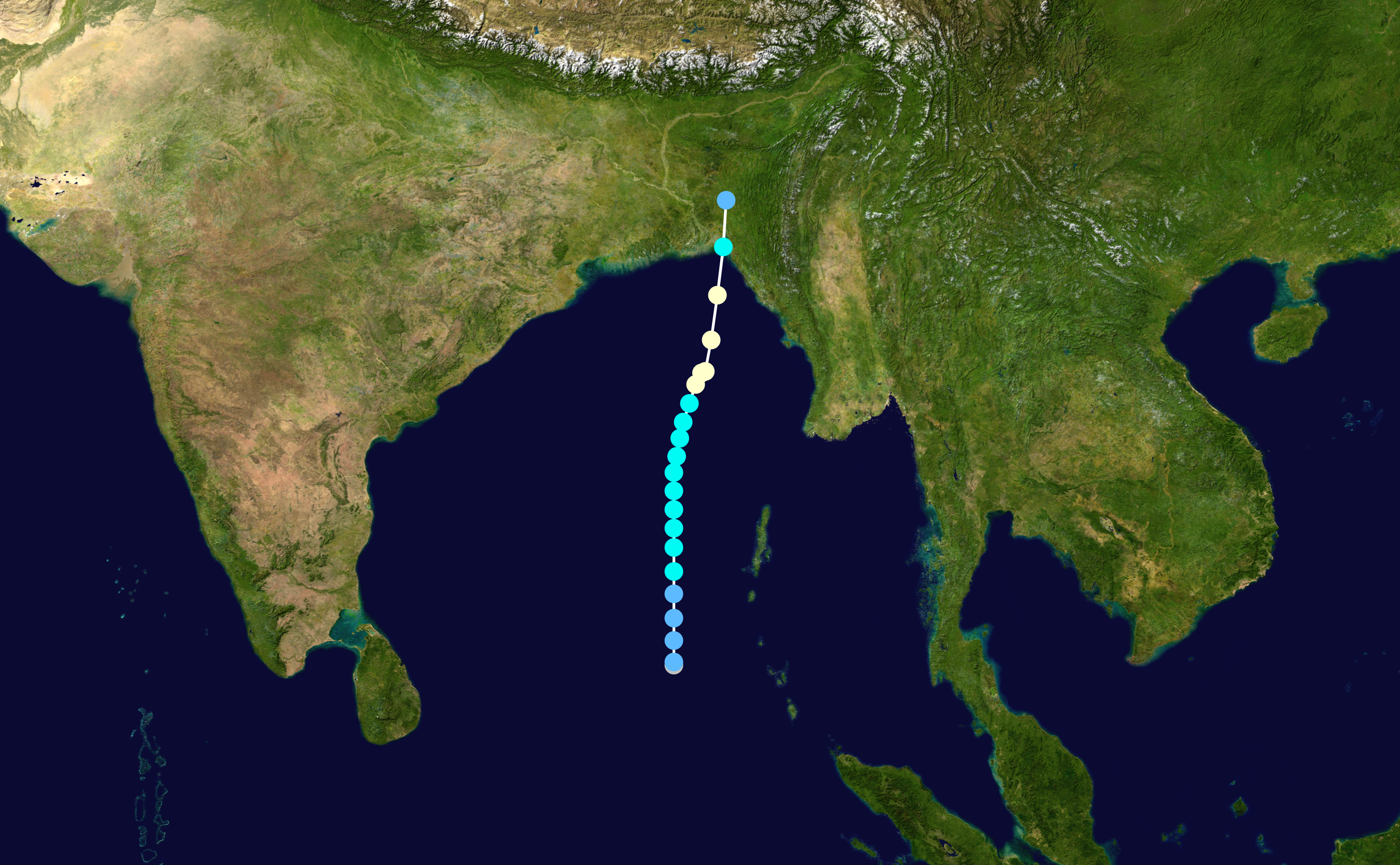
- Duration: May 25 – May 29
- Peak intensity: 240 km/h (150 mph) (3-min); 920 hPa (mbar)

One of the strongest cyclones ever recorded in the Northern Indian Ocean. Had the lowest known pressure in the basin until it was surpassed by the 1991 Bangladesh cyclone. Killed 11,520 people in Bangladesh.

=== Deep Depression Four ===
- Deep depression (IMD)
- Tropical depression (SSHWS)
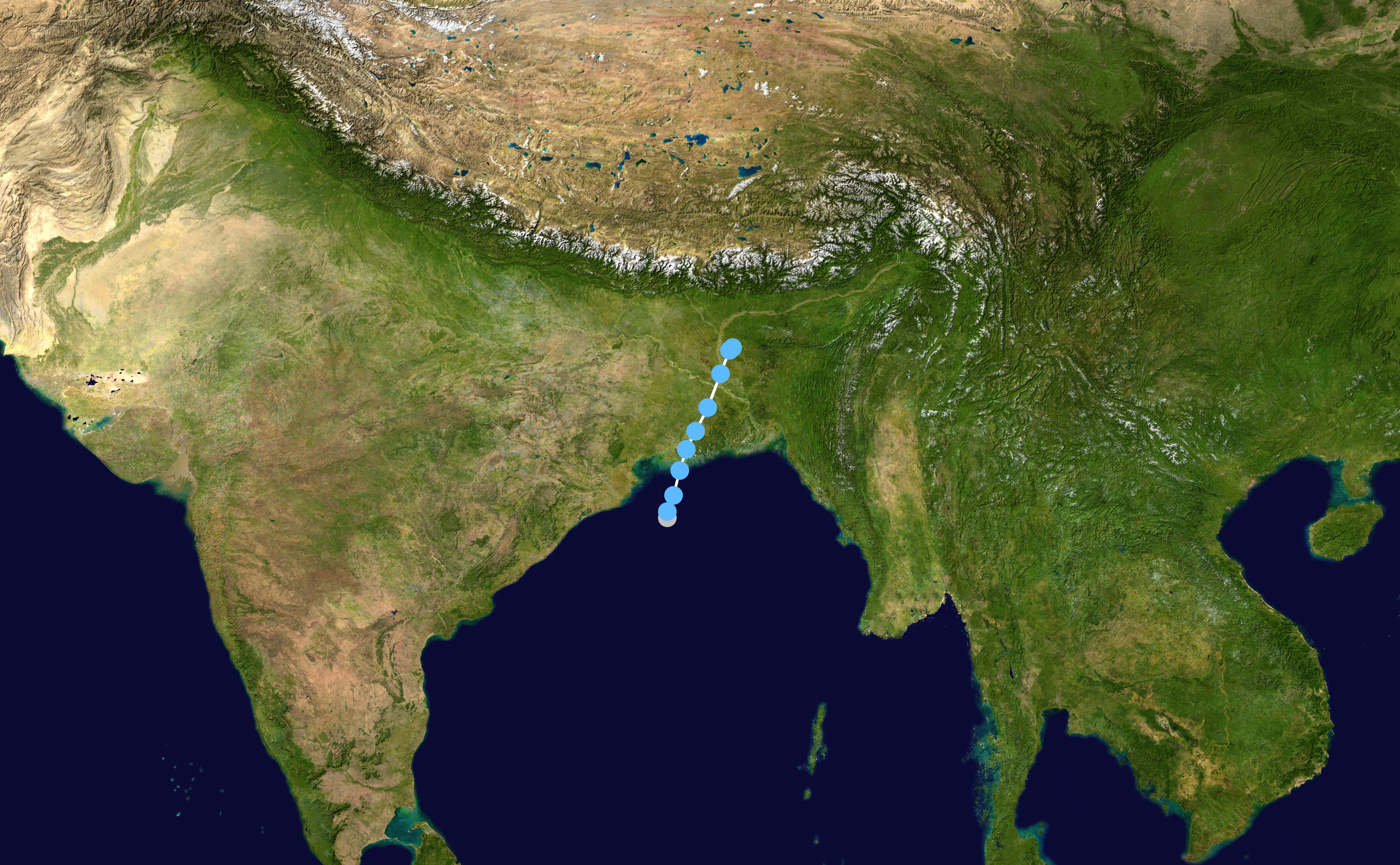
- Duration: June 6 – June 8
- Peak intensity: 55 km/h (35 mph) (3-min); 991 hPa (mbar)

Produced torrential rains over parts of eastern India, peaking at 910 mm (36 in) in Cherrapunji.

=== Depression Five ===
- Depression (IMD)
- Tropical depression (SSHWS)
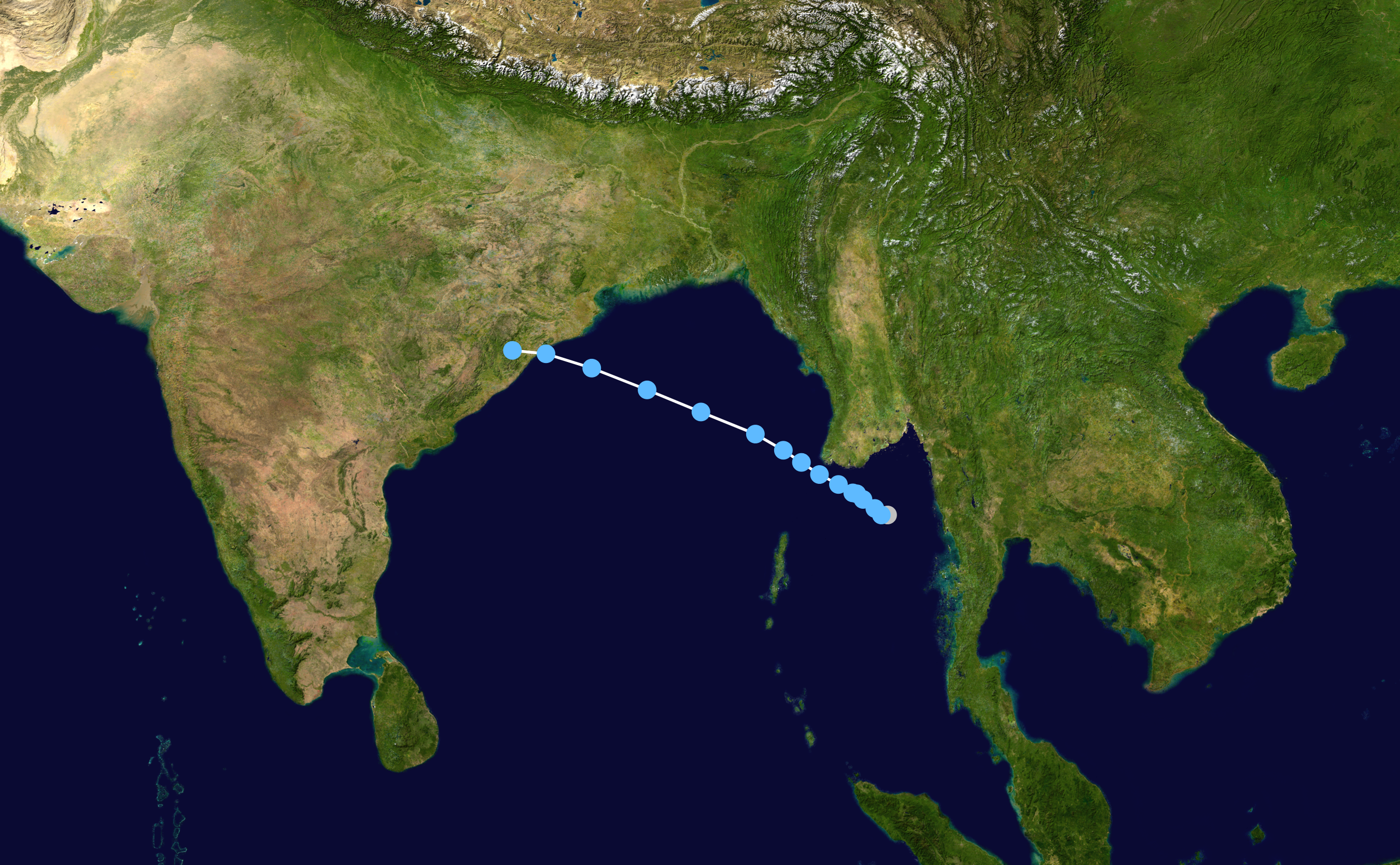
- Duration: June 24 – June 26
- Peak intensity: 45 km/h (30 mph) (3-min); 999 hPa (mbar)

This tropical depression moved from east to west.

=== Depression Six ===
- Depression (IMD)
- Tropical depression (SSHWS)
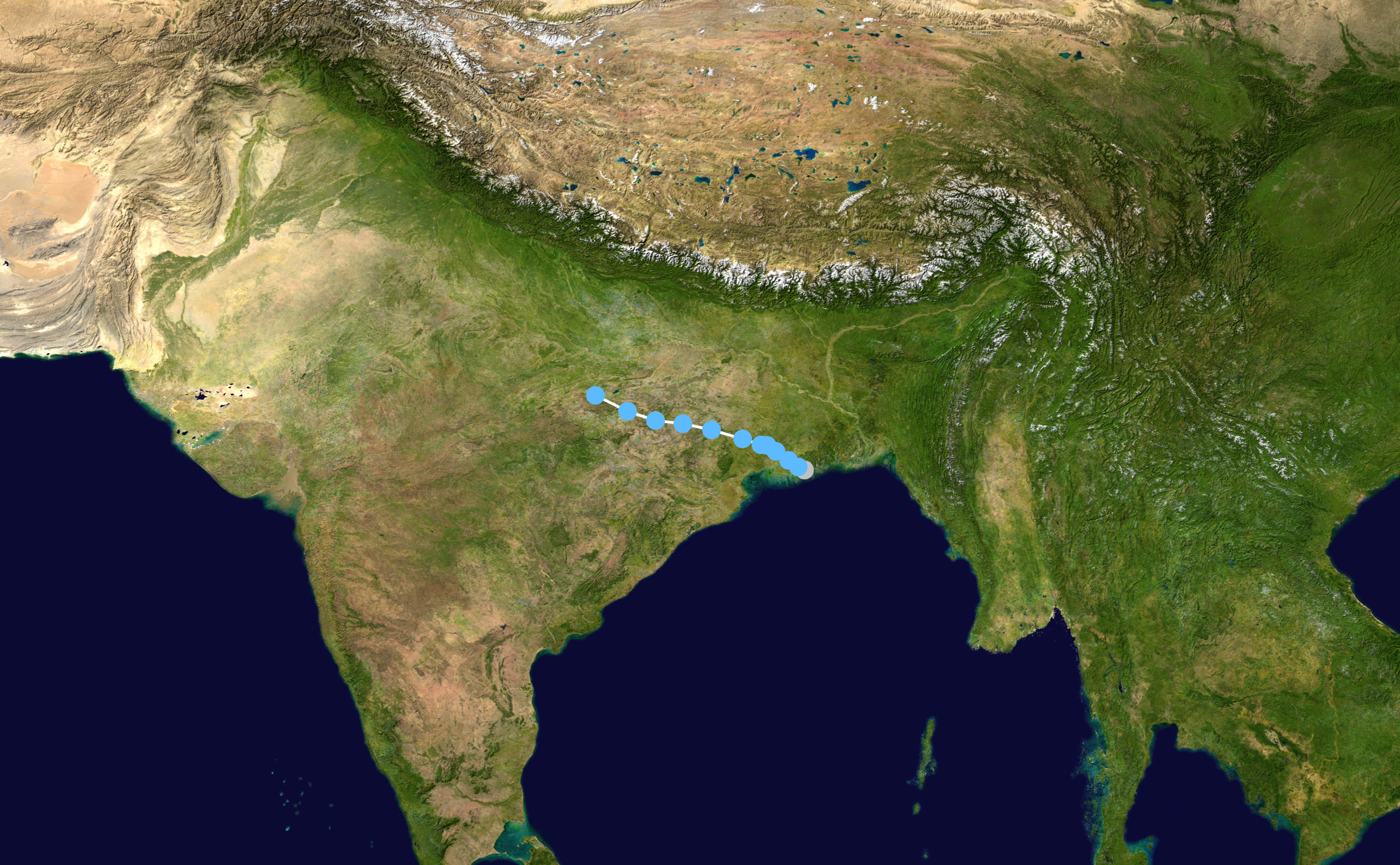
- Duration: July 4 – July 6
- Peak intensity: 45 km/h (30 mph) (1-min);

This tropical depression moved from east to west.

=== Depression Seven ===
- Depression (IMD)
- Tropical depression (SSHWS)
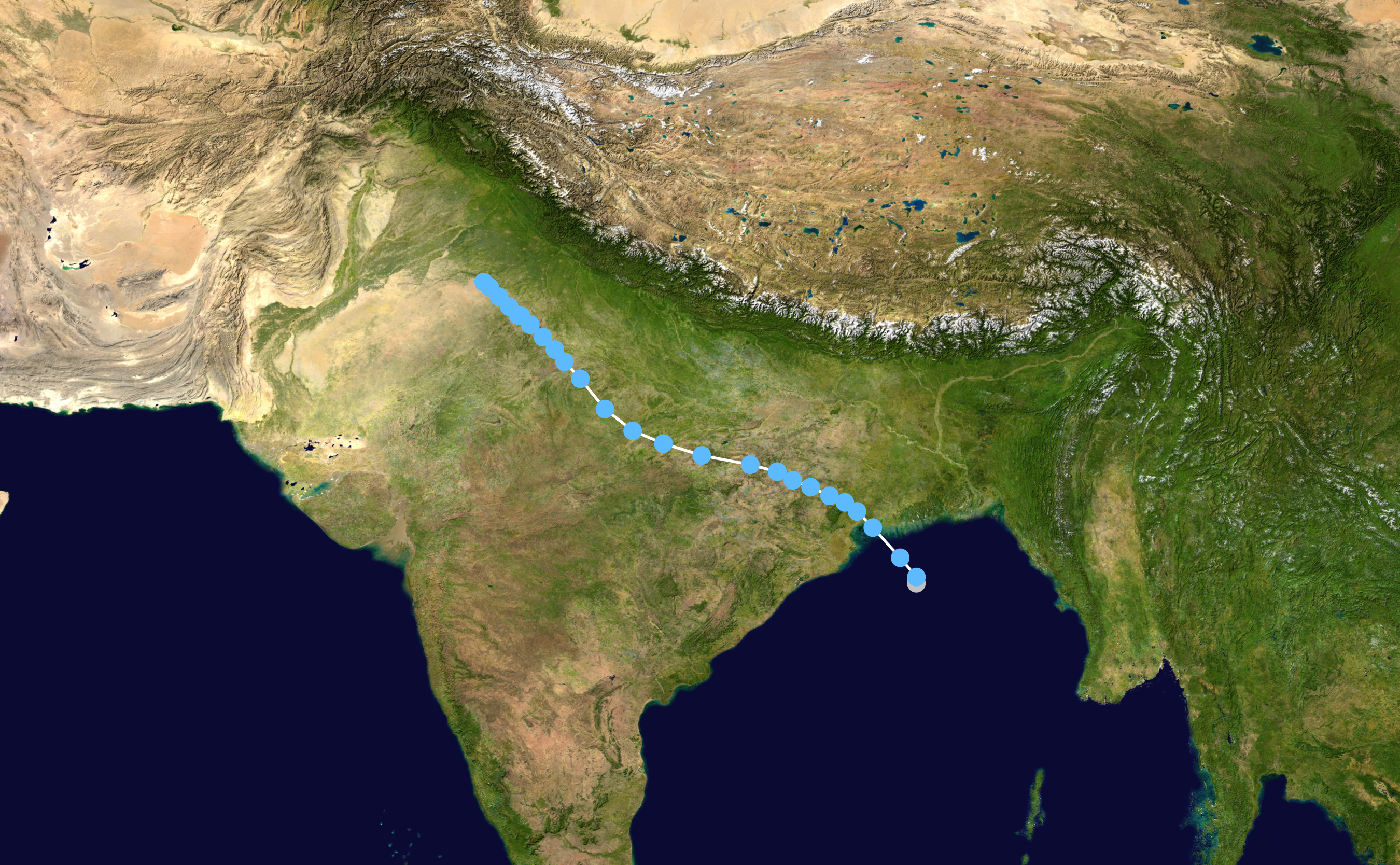
- Duration: August 9 – August 14
- Peak intensity: 45 km/h (30 mph) (3-min); 991 hPa (mbar)

This tropical depression moved from east to west.

=== Deep Depression Eight ===
- Deep depression (IMD)
- Tropical depression (SSHWS)
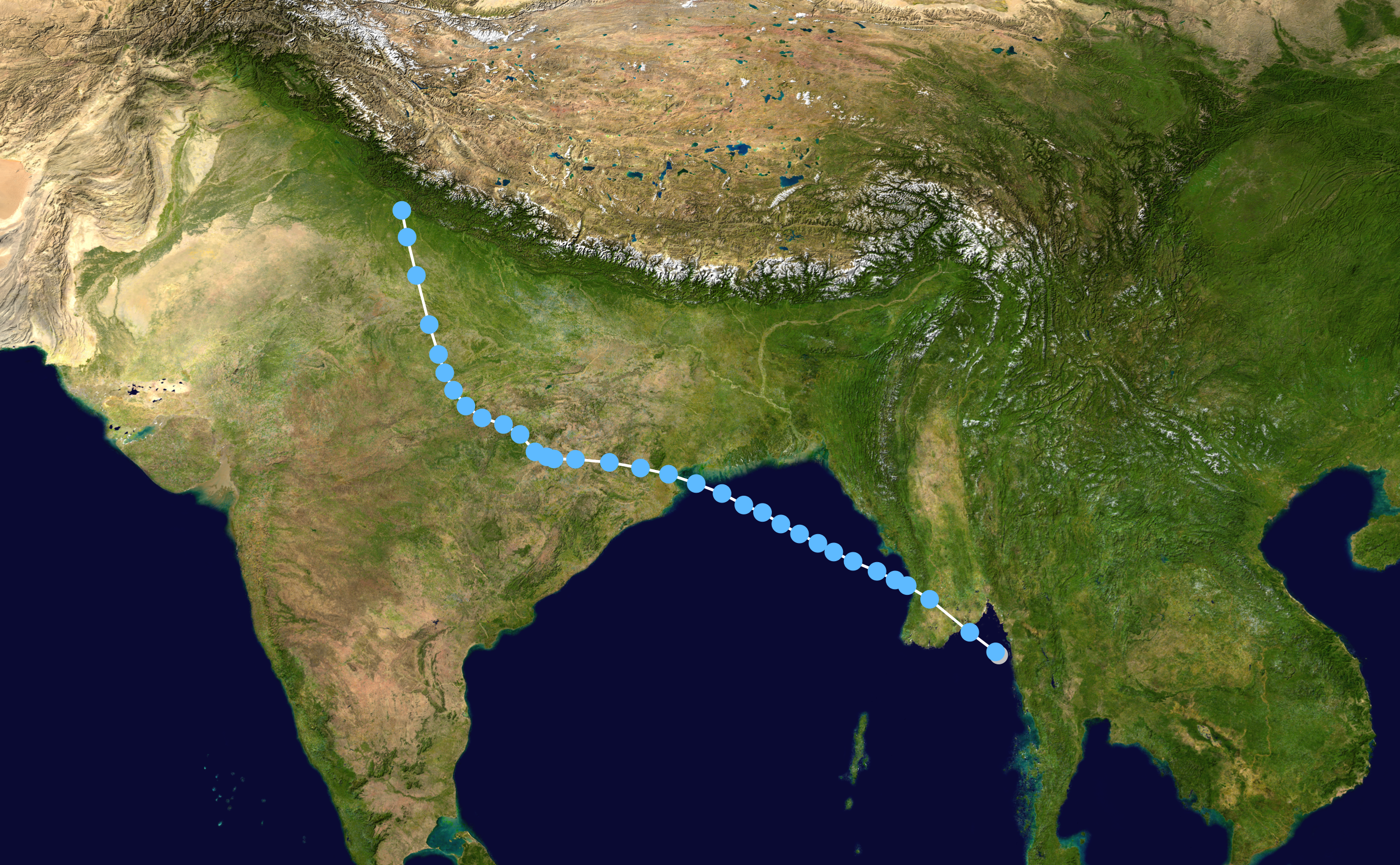
- Duration: September 7 – September 16
- Peak intensity: 45 km/h (30 mph) (3-min); 990 hPa (mbar)

Heavy rains from the storm triggered severe flooding that killed at least 200 people. The storm moved from east to west.

=== Deep Depression Nine ===
- Deep depression (IMD)
- Tropical depression (SSHWS)
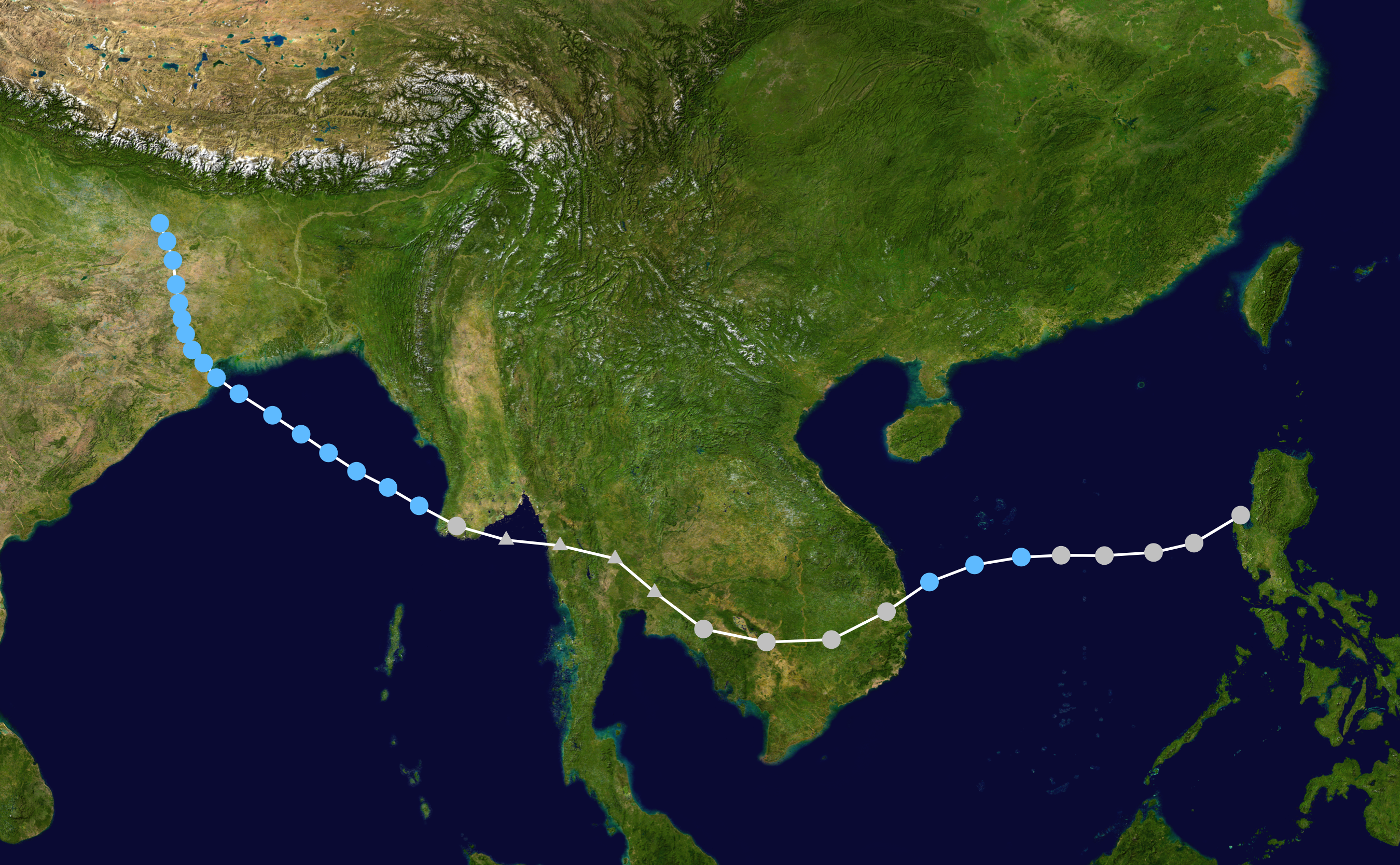
- Duration: September 25 – September 28
- Peak intensity: 55 km/h (35 mph) (3-min); 996 hPa (mbar)

At least 15 people were killed by flooding triggered by the depression in Orissa. The storm was formerly in the Western Pacific as an unnamed CMA tropical depression.

=== Depression Ten ===
- Depression (IMD)
- Tropical depression (SSHWS)
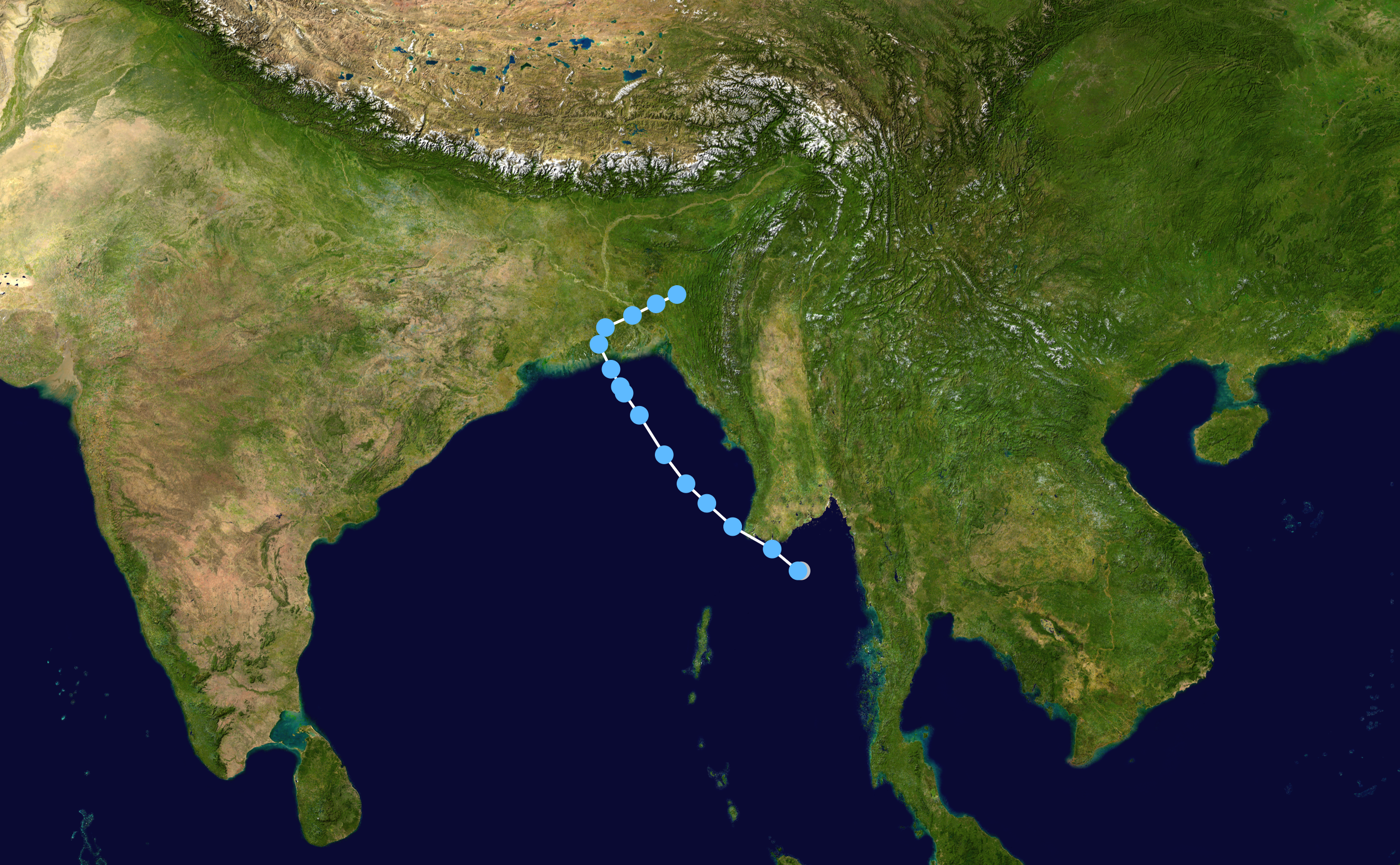
- Duration: October 5 – October 7
- Peak intensity: 55 km/h (35 mph) (3-min); 995 hPa (mbar)

Some loss of life was reported in East Pakistan.

=== Cyclonic Storm Eleven ===
- Cyclonic storm (IMD)
- Tropical storm (SSHWS)
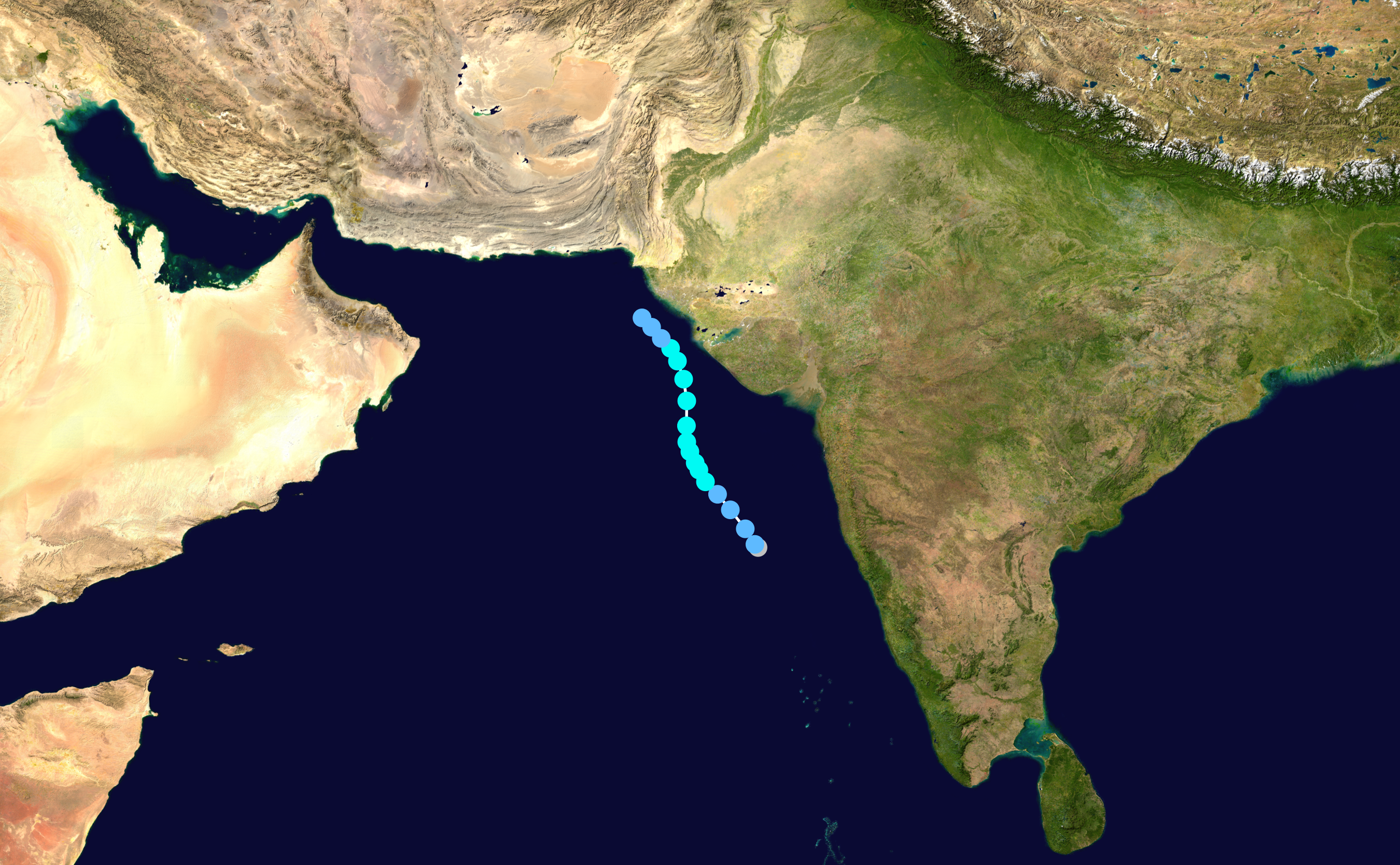
- Duration: October 13 – October 17
- Peak intensity: 75 km/h (45 mph) (3-min); 999 hPa (mbar)

=== Very Severe Cyclonic Storm Twelve-Fourteen ===
- Very severe cyclonic storm (IMD)
- Category 1 tropical cyclone (SSHWS)
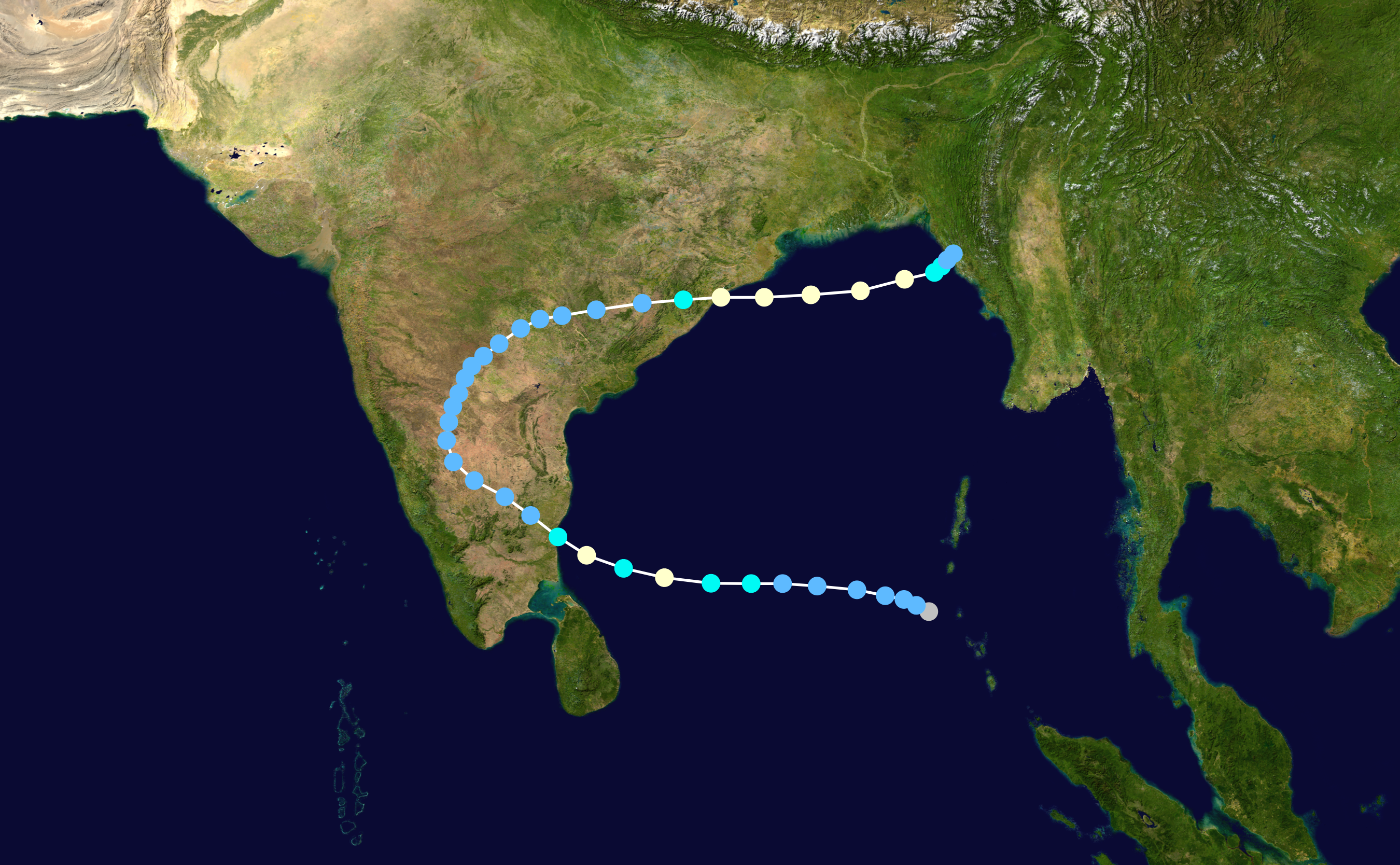
- Duration: October 19 – October 28
- Peak intensity: 150 km/h (90 mph) (3-min); 984 hPa (mbar)

Significant damage and flooding took place in India, with some loss of life reported. The storm was classified under two different designations, but was reanalyzed to be one system.

=== Depression Thirteen ===
- Depression (IMD)
- Tropical depression (SSHWS)
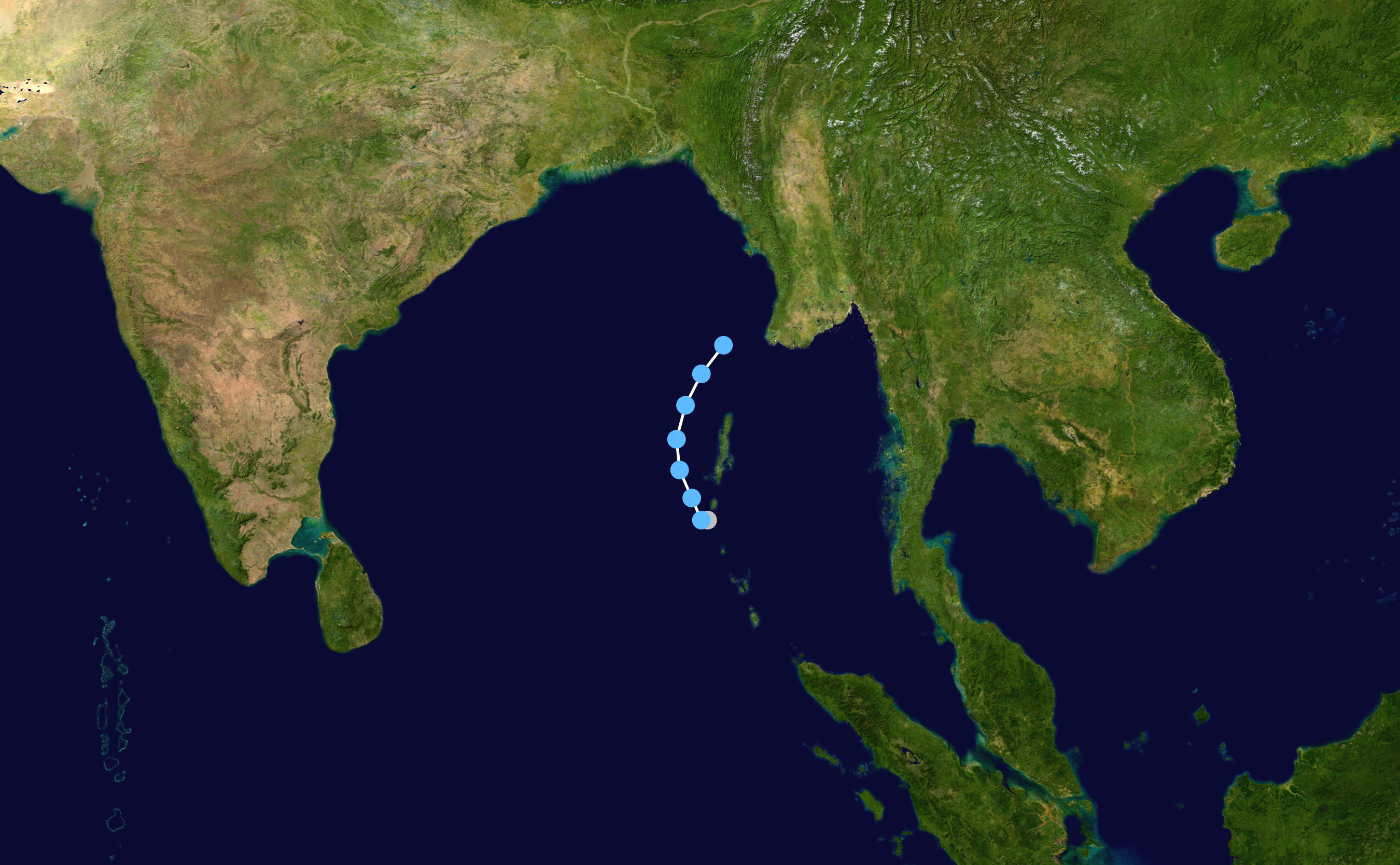
- Duration: October 24 – October 26
- Peak intensity: 55 km/h (35 mph) (3-min);

The storm moved from south to north.

=== Depression Fifteen ===
- Depression (IMD)
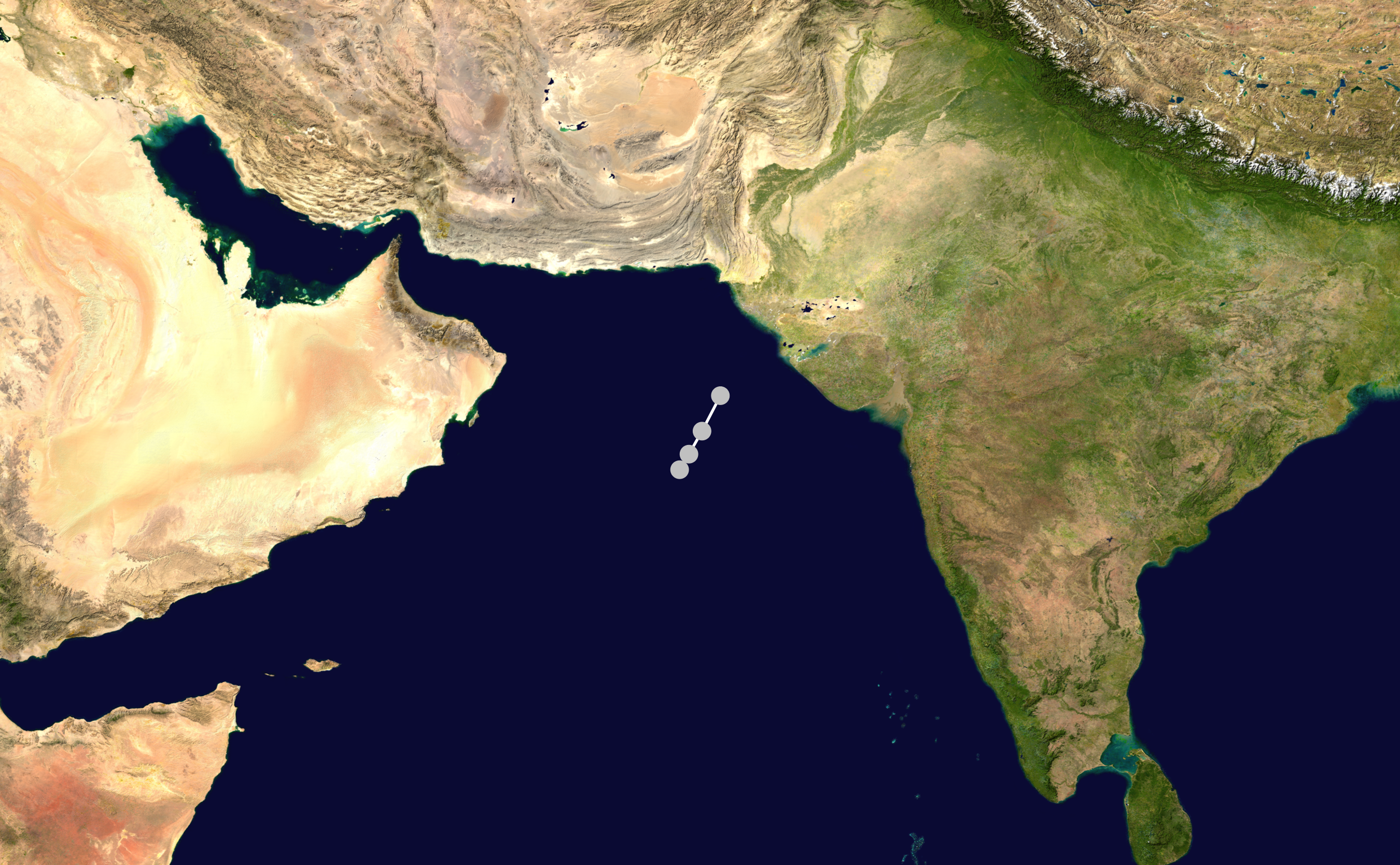
- Duration: November 24 – November 25
- Peak intensity: 45 km/h (30 mph) (3-min);

This tropical depression moved from south to north.

=== Cyclonic Storm Sixteen ===
- Cyclonic storm (IMD)
- Tropical storm (SSHWS)
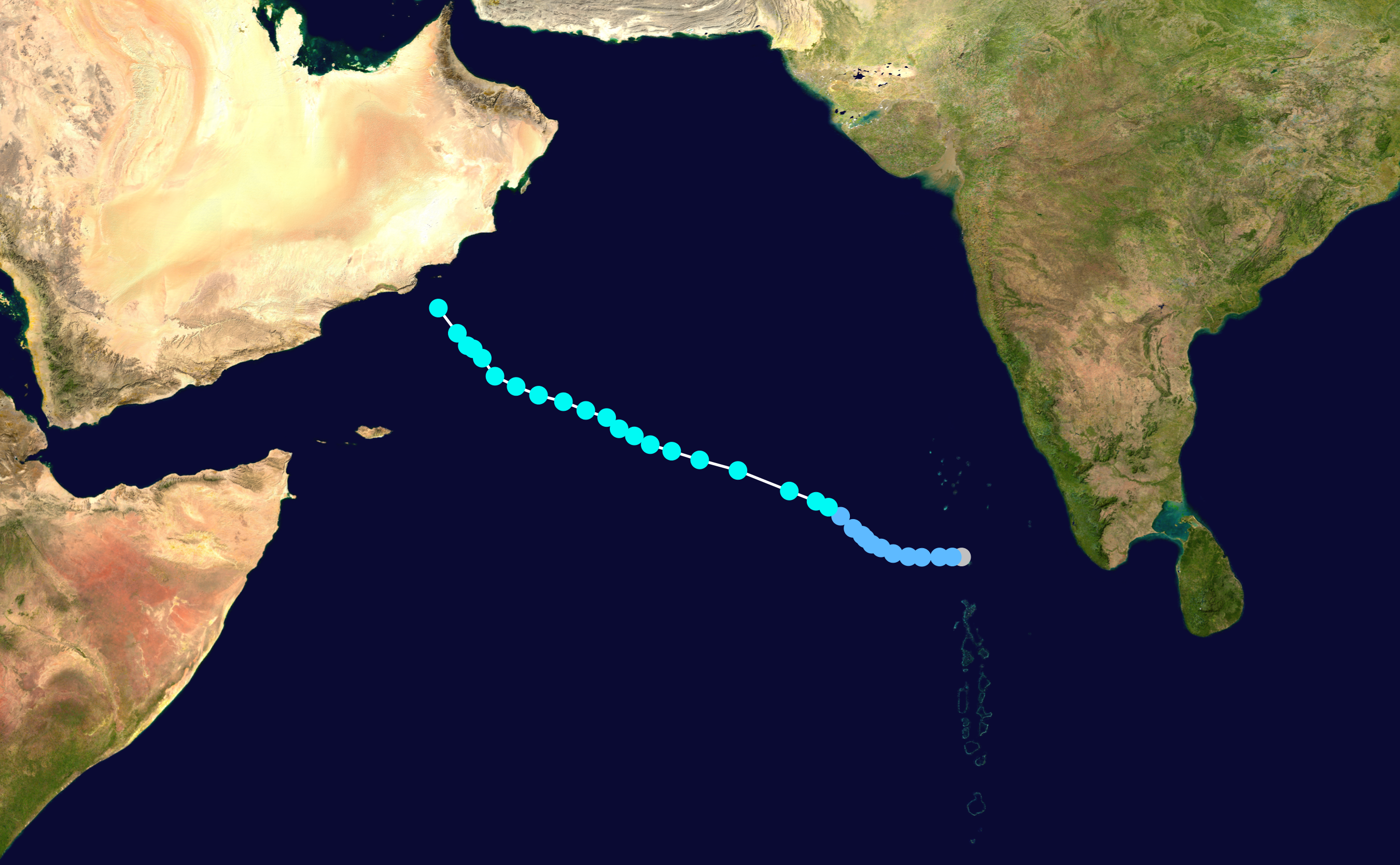
- Duration: November 29 – December 7
- Peak intensity: 65 km/h (40 mph) (3-min); 1002 hPa (mbar)

This cyclonic storm moved from east to west.

=== Deep Depression Seventeen ===
- Deep depression (IMD)
- Tropical storm (SSHWS)
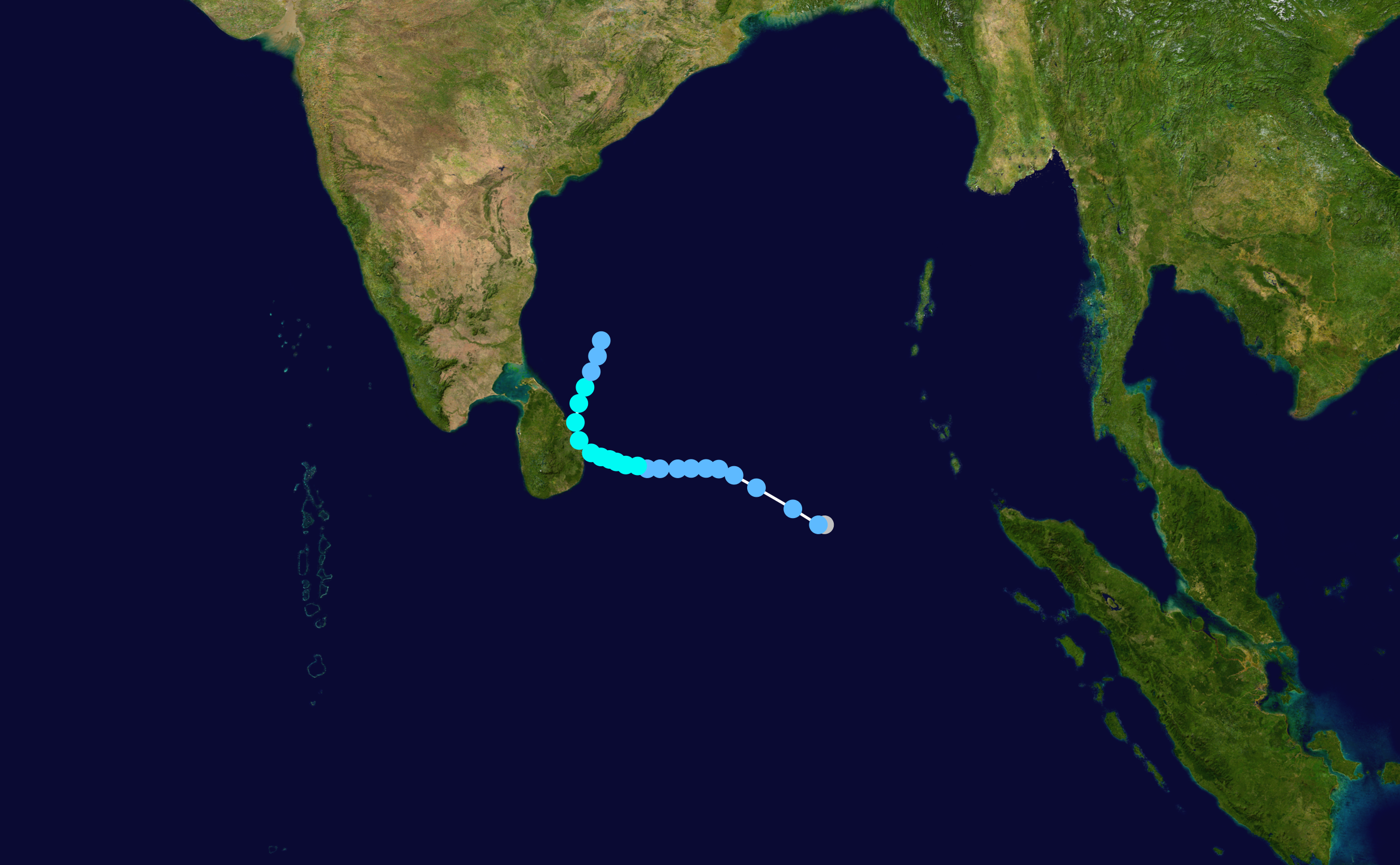
- Duration: November 30 – December 6
- Peak intensity: 55 km/h (35 mph) (3-min); 1004 hPa (mbar)

This storm moved from east to west.

== See also ==
- North Indian Ocean tropical cyclone
- List of tropical cyclone records
- 1963 Atlantic hurricane season
- 1963 Pacific hurricane season
- 1963 Pacific typhoon season
- Australian region cyclone seasons: 1962–63 1963–64
- South Pacific cyclone seasons: 1962–63 1963–64
- South-West Indian Ocean cyclone seasons: 1962–63 1963–64
