= 1963–64 South-West Indian Ocean cyclone season =

Cyclone season in the Southwest Indian Ocean

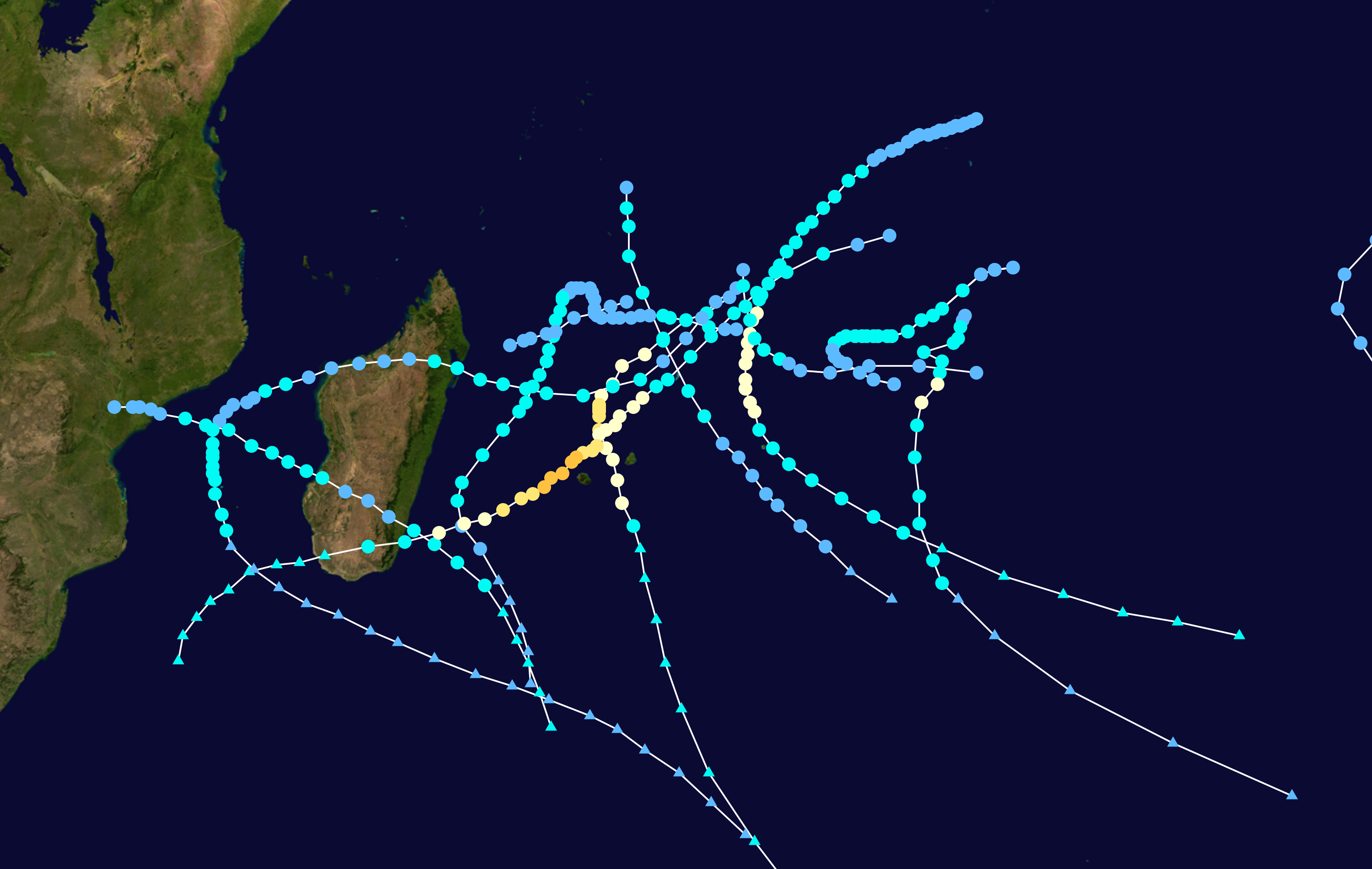
- Season summary map

Seasonal boundaries
- First system formed: December 1, 1963
- Last system dissipated: May 2, 1964

Strongest storm
- Name: Giselle

Seasonal statistics
- Total fatalities: Unknown
- Total damage: Unknown

Related articles
- 1963–64 Australian region cyclone season; 1963–64 South Pacific cyclone season

The 1963–64 South-West Indian Ocean cyclone season was an average cyclone season.

== Systems ==
=== Tropical Cyclone Amanda ===
- Tropical cyclone (MFR)
- Category 1 tropical cyclone (SSHWS)
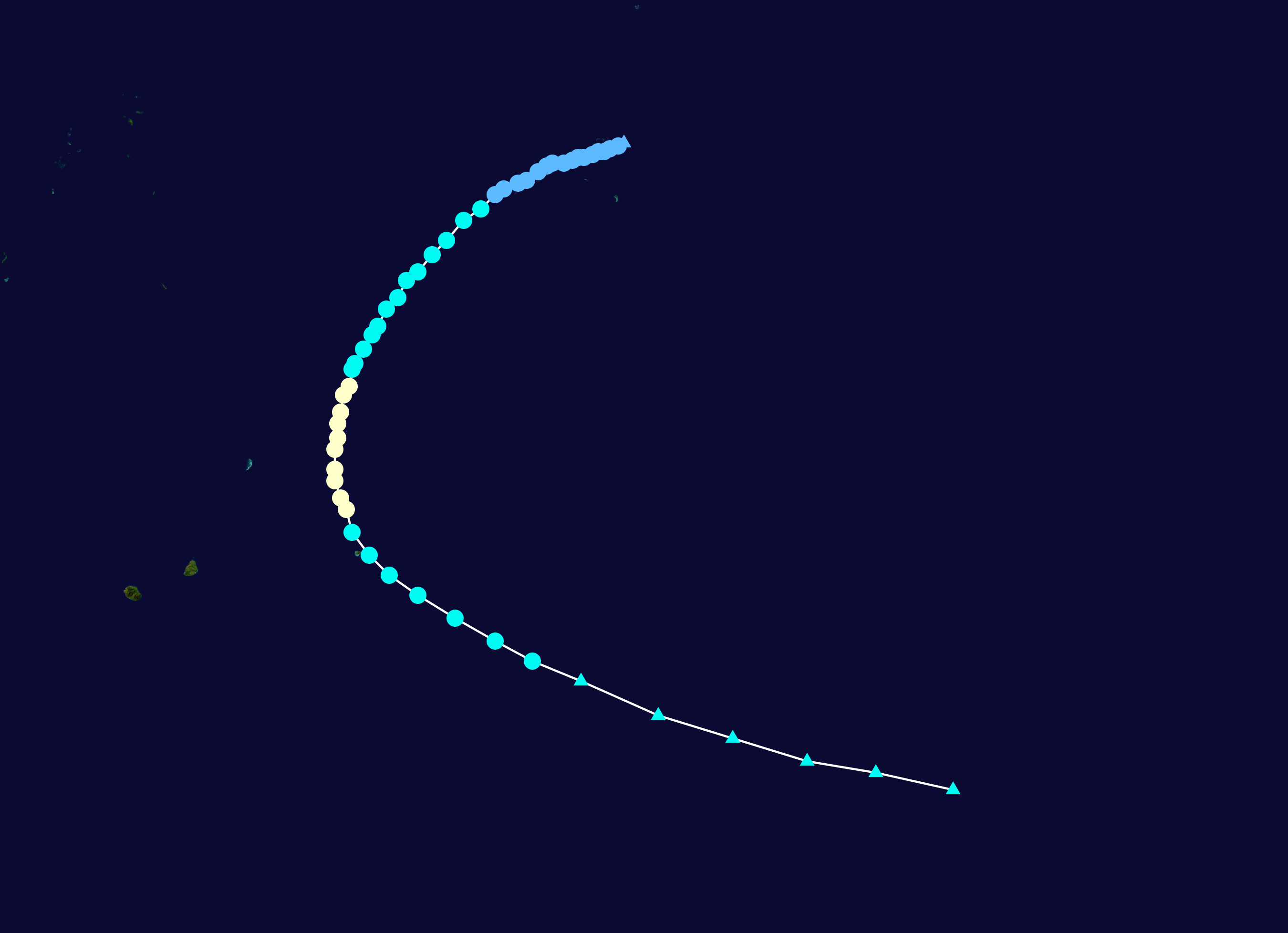
- Duration: December 1 – December 14
- Peak intensity: 130 km/h (80 mph) (10-min);

Amanda existed from December 1 to December 14.

=== Moderate Tropical Storm Betty ===
- Moderate tropical storm (MFR)
- Tropical storm (SSHWS)
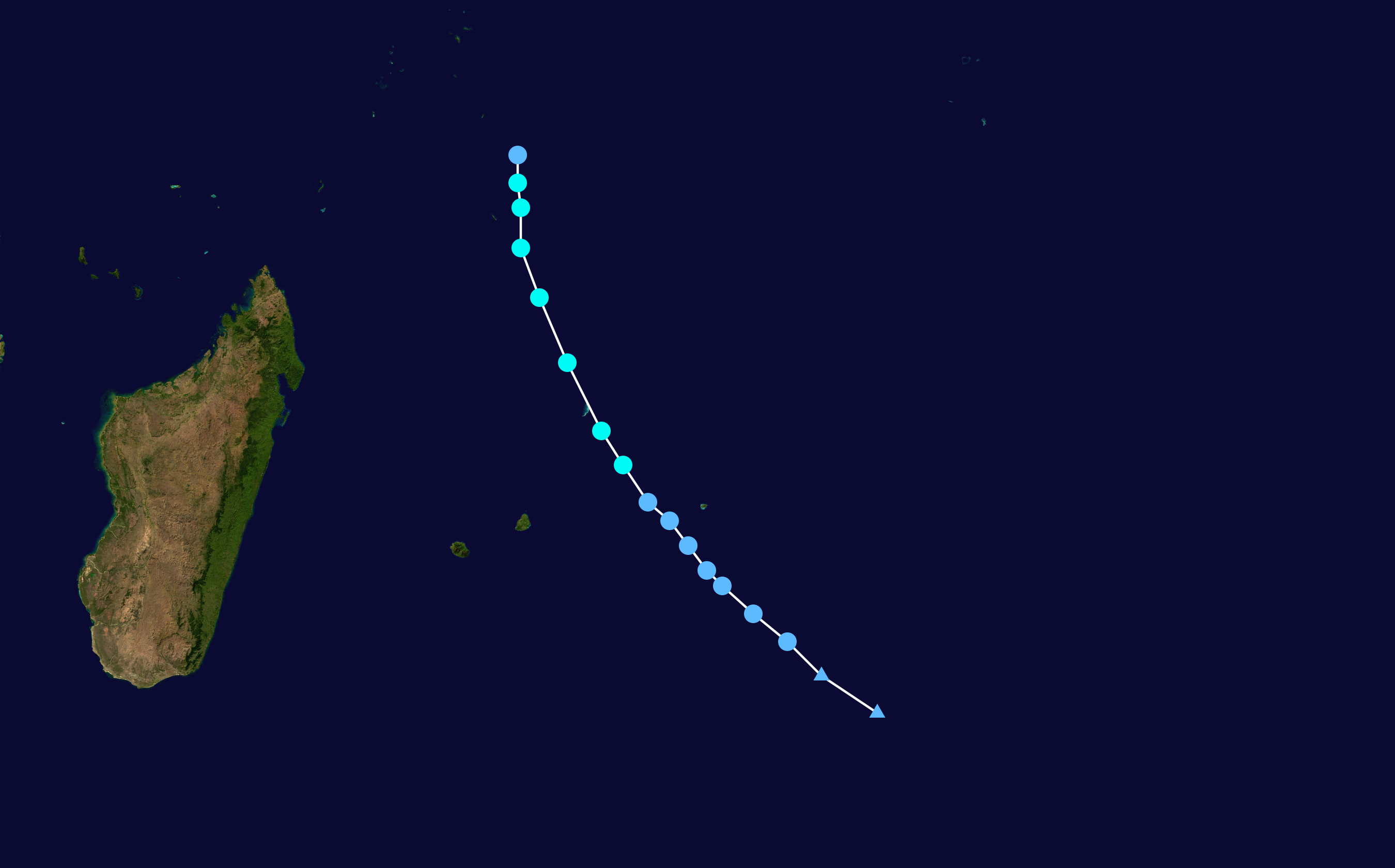
- Duration: December 23 – December 28
- Peak intensity: 65 km/h (40 mph) (10-min);

Betty existed from December 23 to December 28.

=== Severe Tropical Storm Christine ===
- Severe tropical storm (MFR)
- Tropical storm (SSHWS)
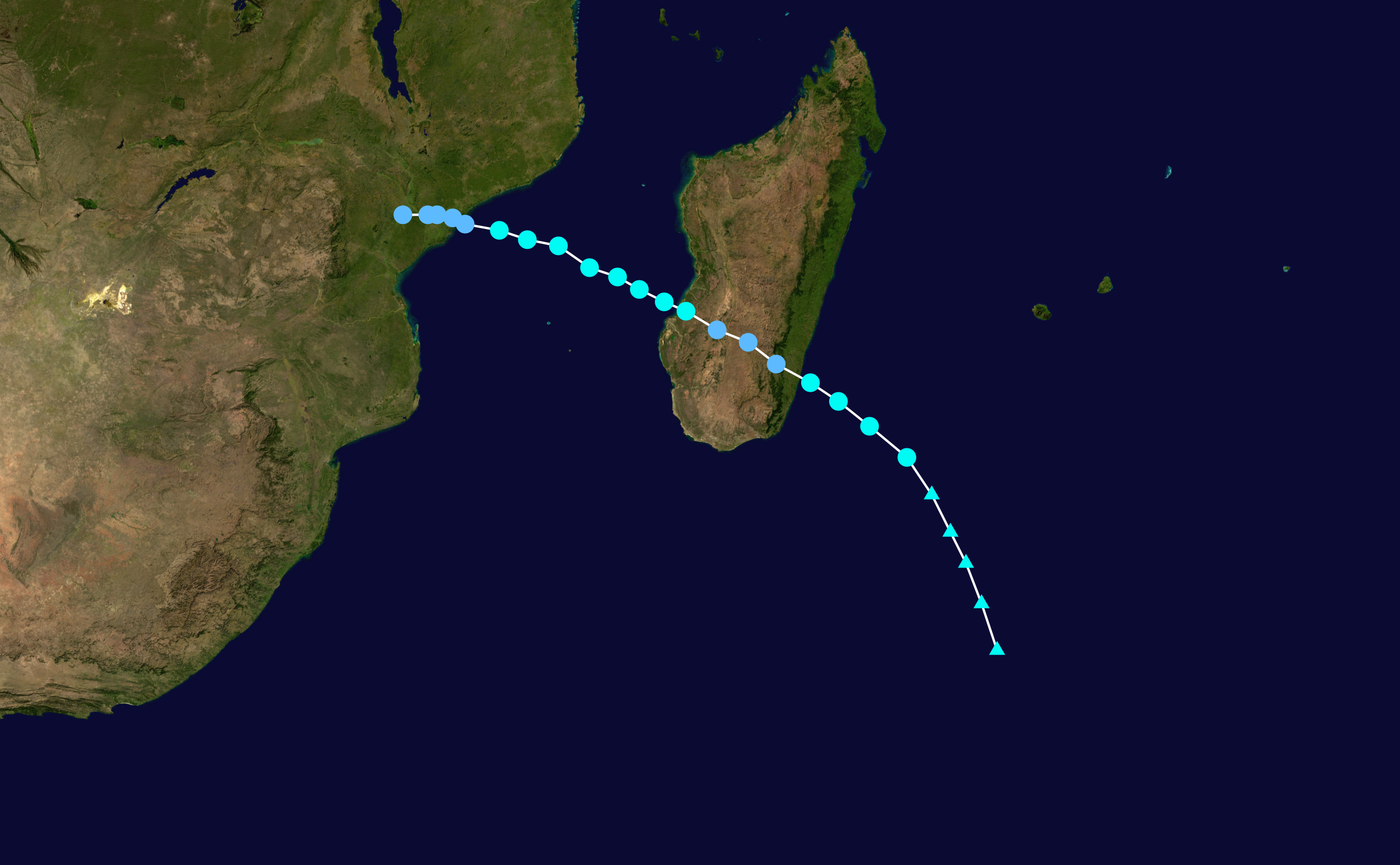
- Duration: January 9 – January 16
- Peak intensity: 95 km/h (60 mph) (10-min);

Christine existed from January 9 to January 16.

=== Tropical Cyclone Danielle ===
- Tropical cyclone (MFR)
- Category 2 tropical cyclone (SSHWS)
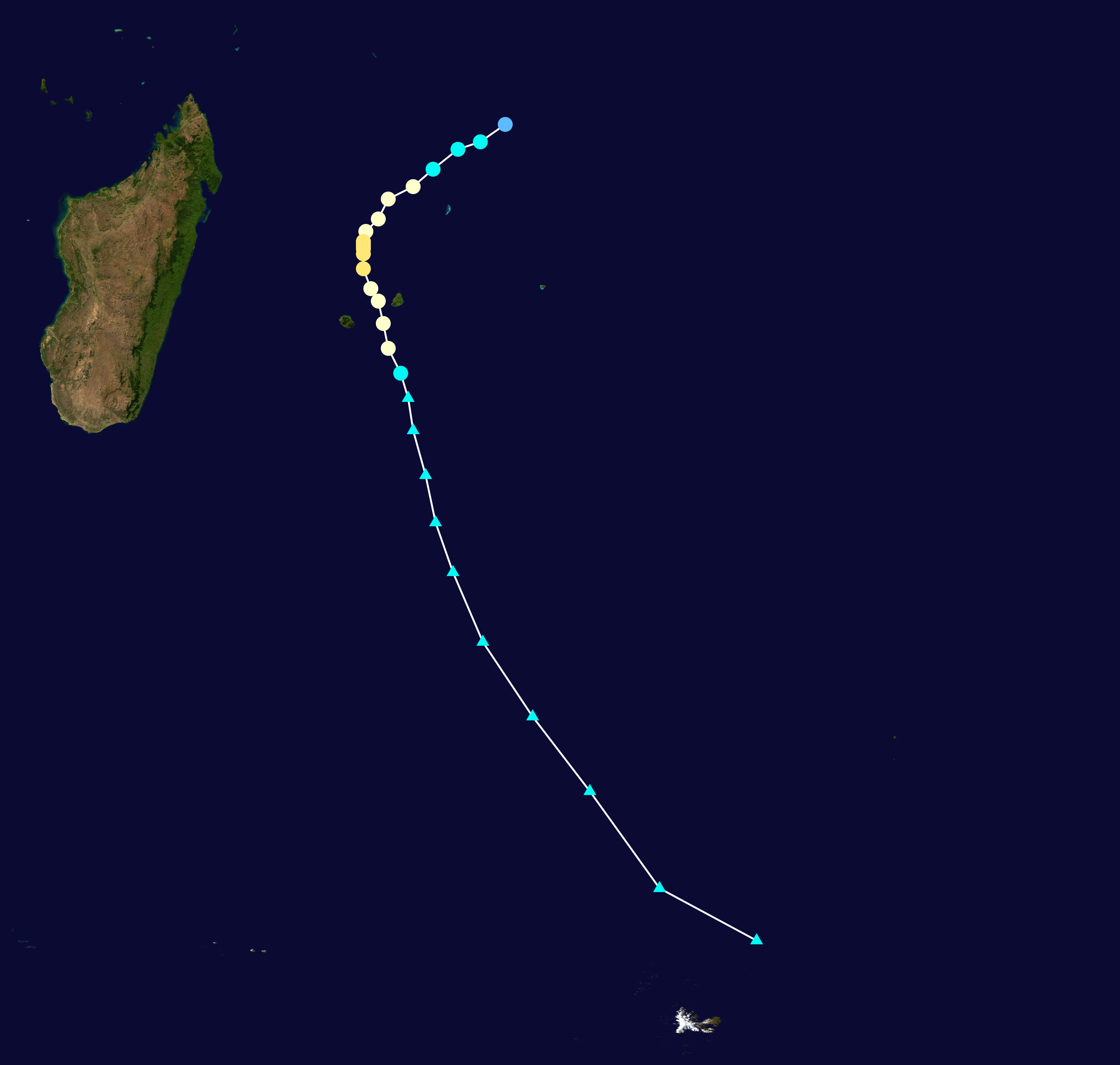
- Duration: January 15 – January 23
- Peak intensity: 150 km/h (90 mph) (10-min); 974 hPa (mbar)

Danielle existed from January 15 to January 23. On January 20, Danielle crossed between Réunion and Mauritius, producing wind gusts of 219 km/h (136 mph) in the latter island. Over three days, the storm dropped heavy rainfall, reaching 795 mm (31.3 in).

=== Moderate Tropical Storm Eileen ===
- Moderate tropical storm (MFR)
- Tropical storm (SSHWS)
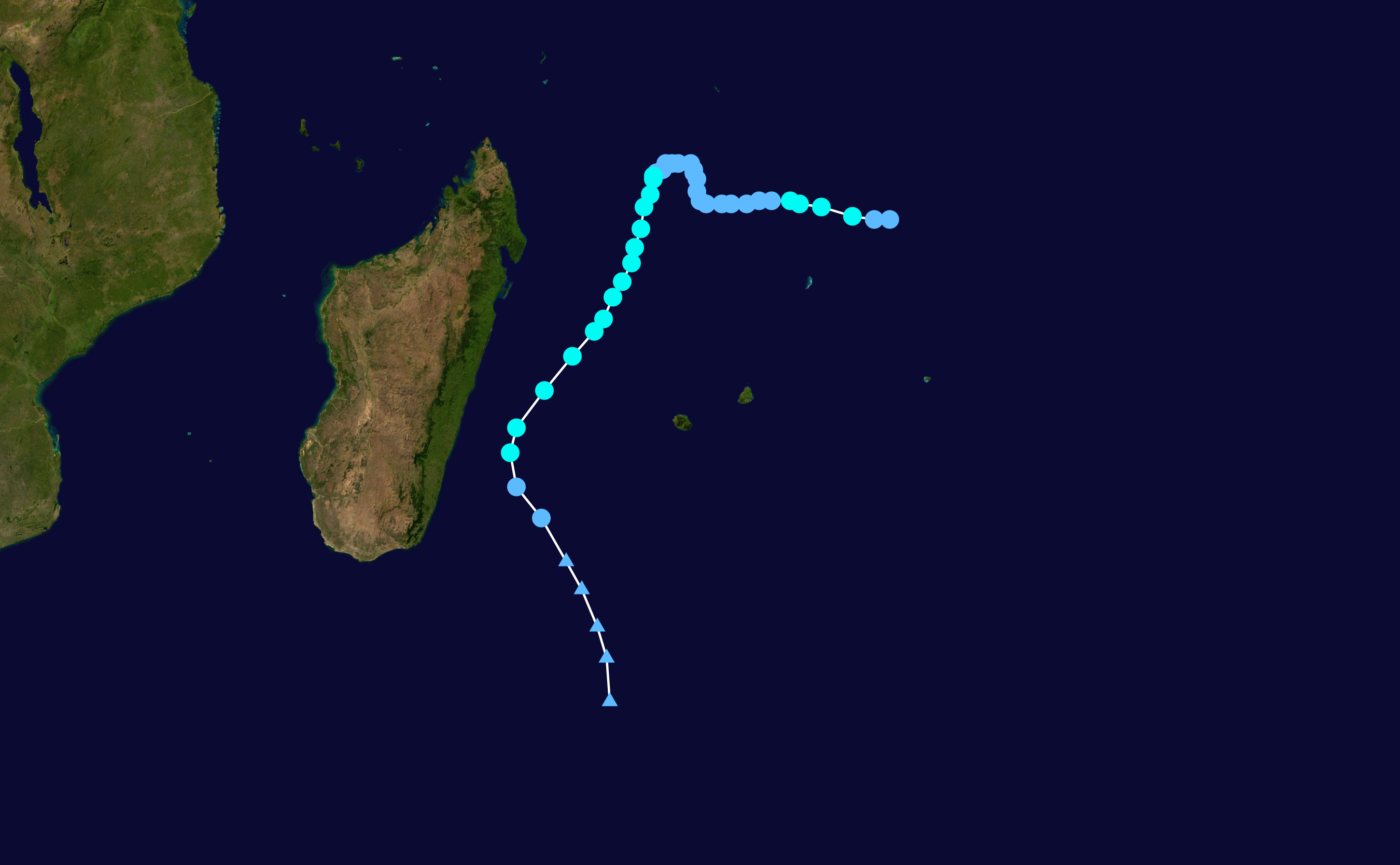
- Duration: January 29 – February 10
- Peak intensity: 75 km/h (45 mph) (10-min);

Eileen existed from January 29 to February 10.

=== Tropical Disturbance Frances ===
- Tropical disturbance (MFR)
- Tropical depression (SSHWS)
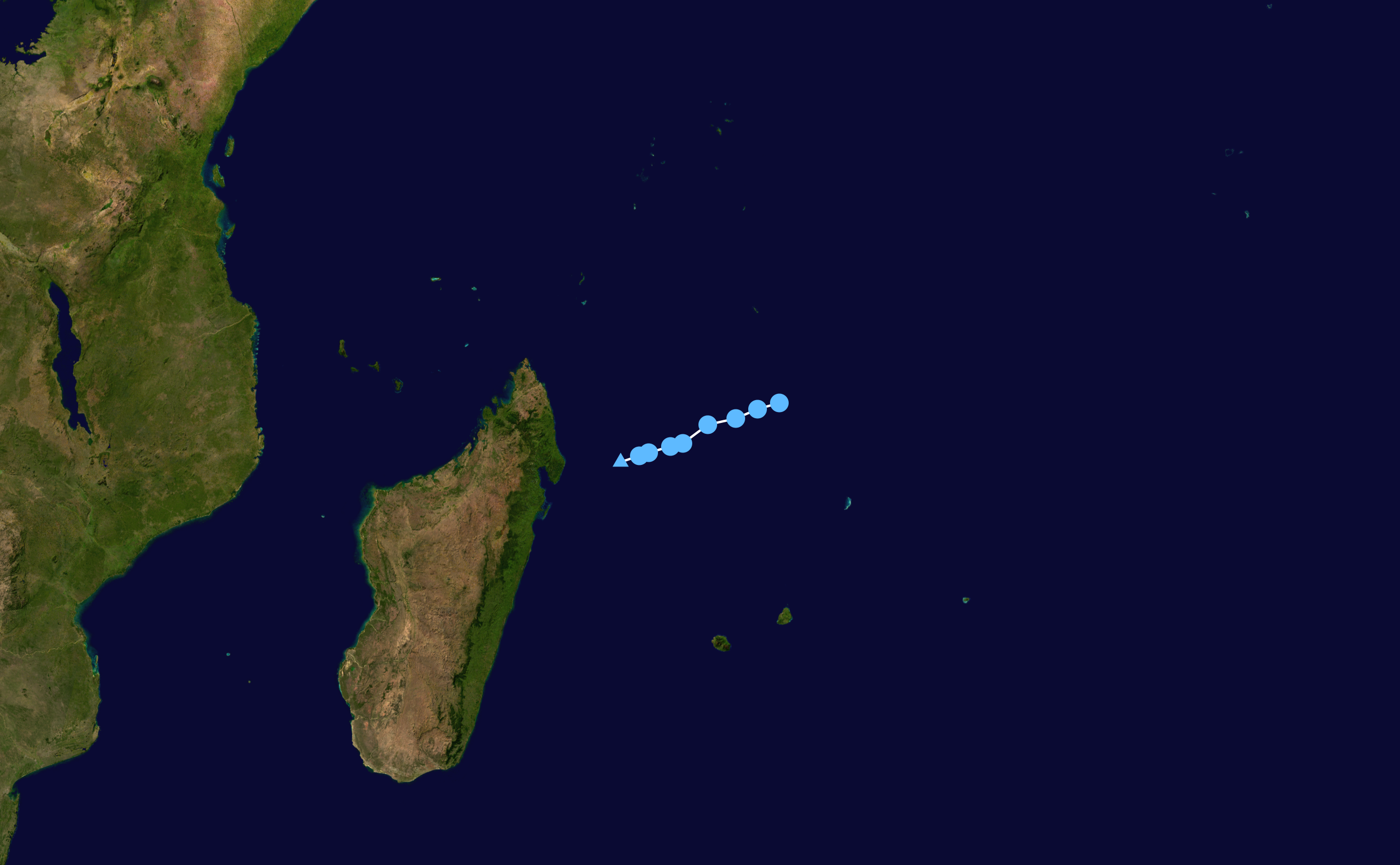
- Duration: February 19 – February 23
- Peak intensity: 45 km/h (30 mph) (10-min);

Frances existed from February 19 to February 23.

=== Intense Tropical Cyclone Giselle ===
- Intense tropical cyclone (MFR)
- Category 3 tropical cyclone (SSHWS)
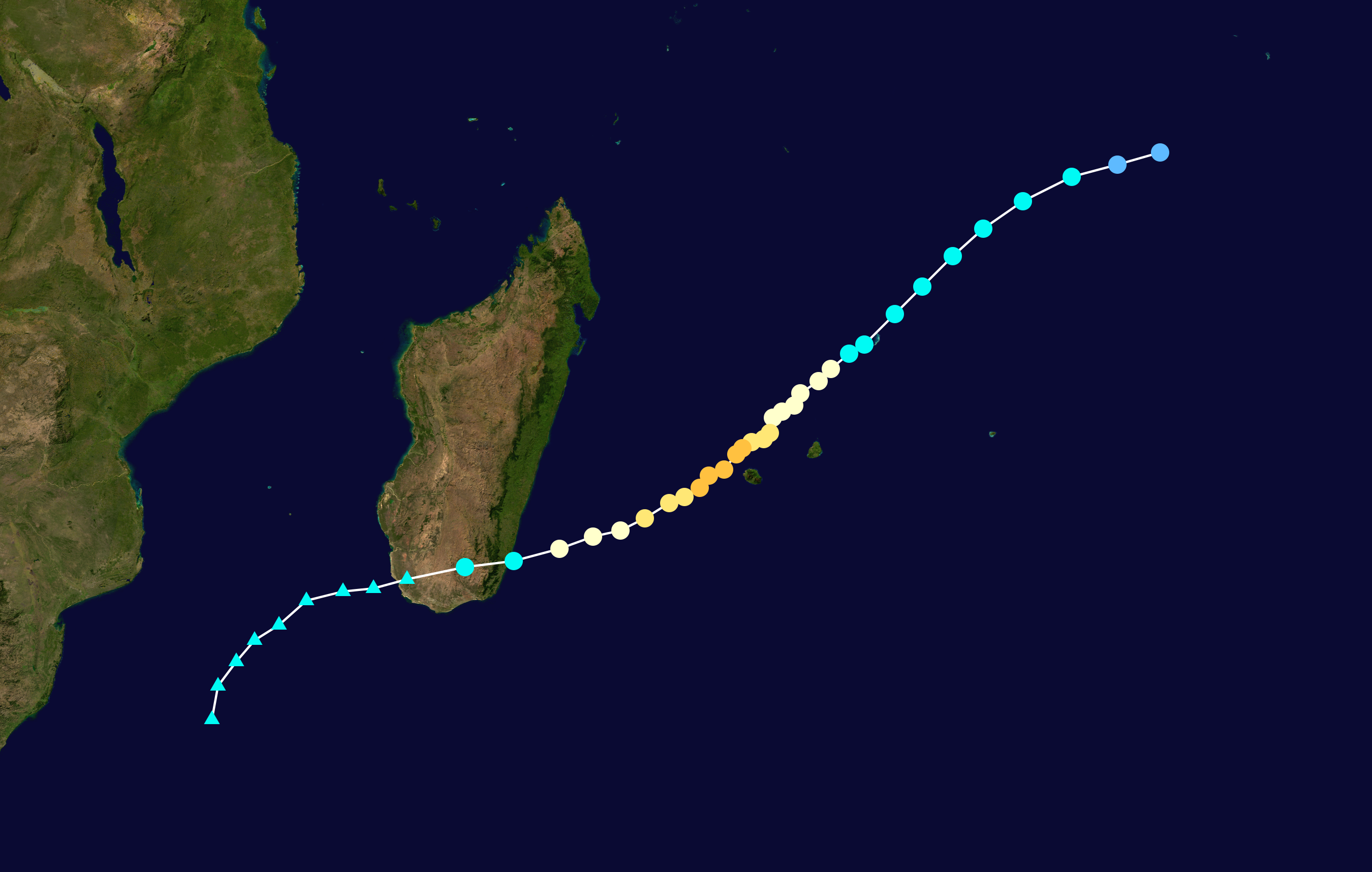
- Duration: February 22 – March 4
- Peak intensity: 165 km/h (105 mph) (10-min);

Giselle existed from February 22 to March 4.

On February 28, Giselle passed just northwest of Réunion, producing wind gusts of 180 km/h (110 mph). Four days' of rainfall, reaching 2,708 mm (106.6 in) at Belouve, caused heavy flooding damage.

=== Moderate Tropical Storm Harriet ===
- Moderate tropical storm (MFR)
- Tropical storm (SSHWS)
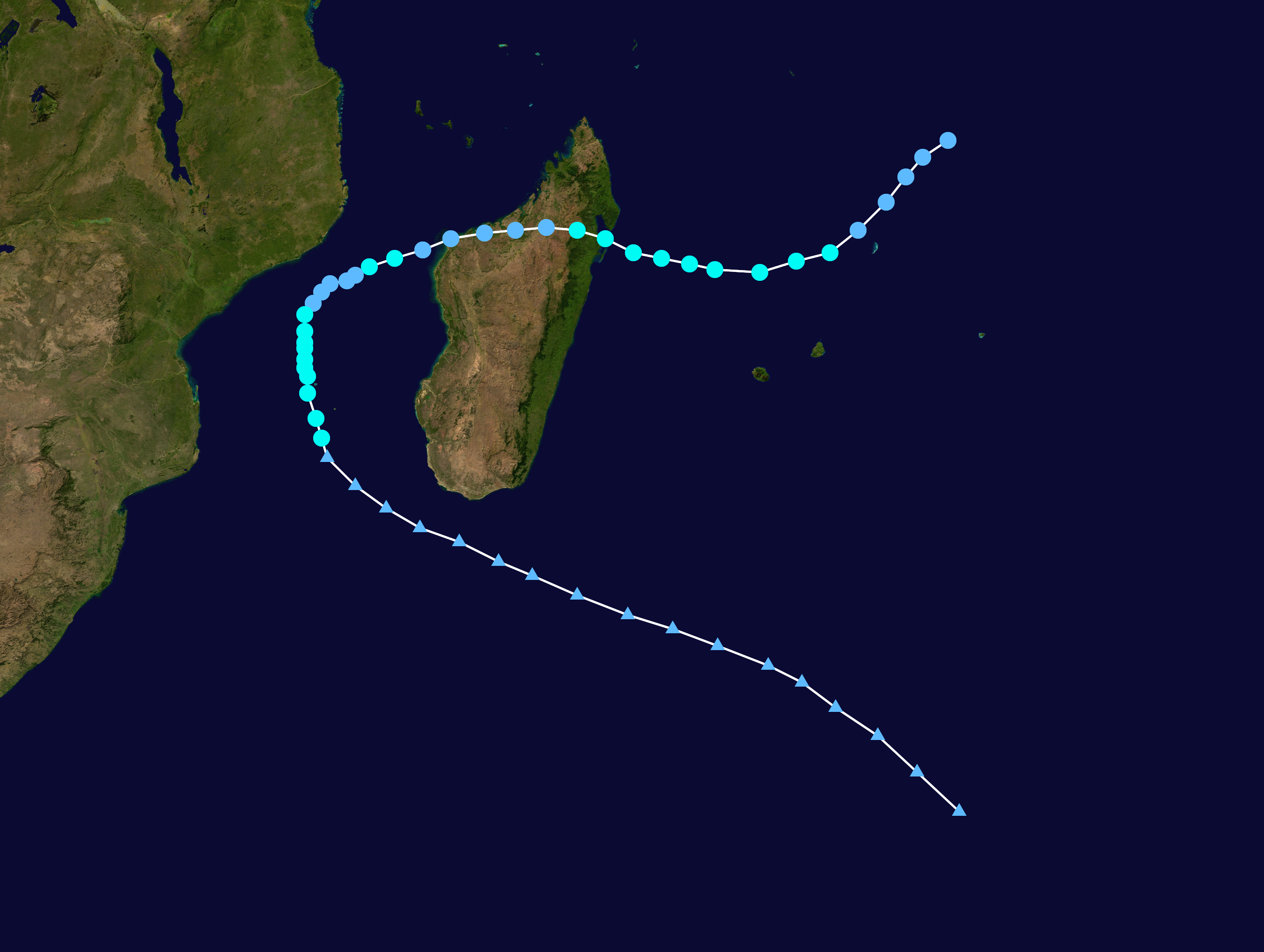
- Duration: March 4 – March 17
- Peak intensity: 75 km/h (45 mph) (10-min);

Harriet existed from March 4 to March 17.

=== Tropical Cyclone Ingrid ===
- Category 1 tropical cyclone (SSHWS)
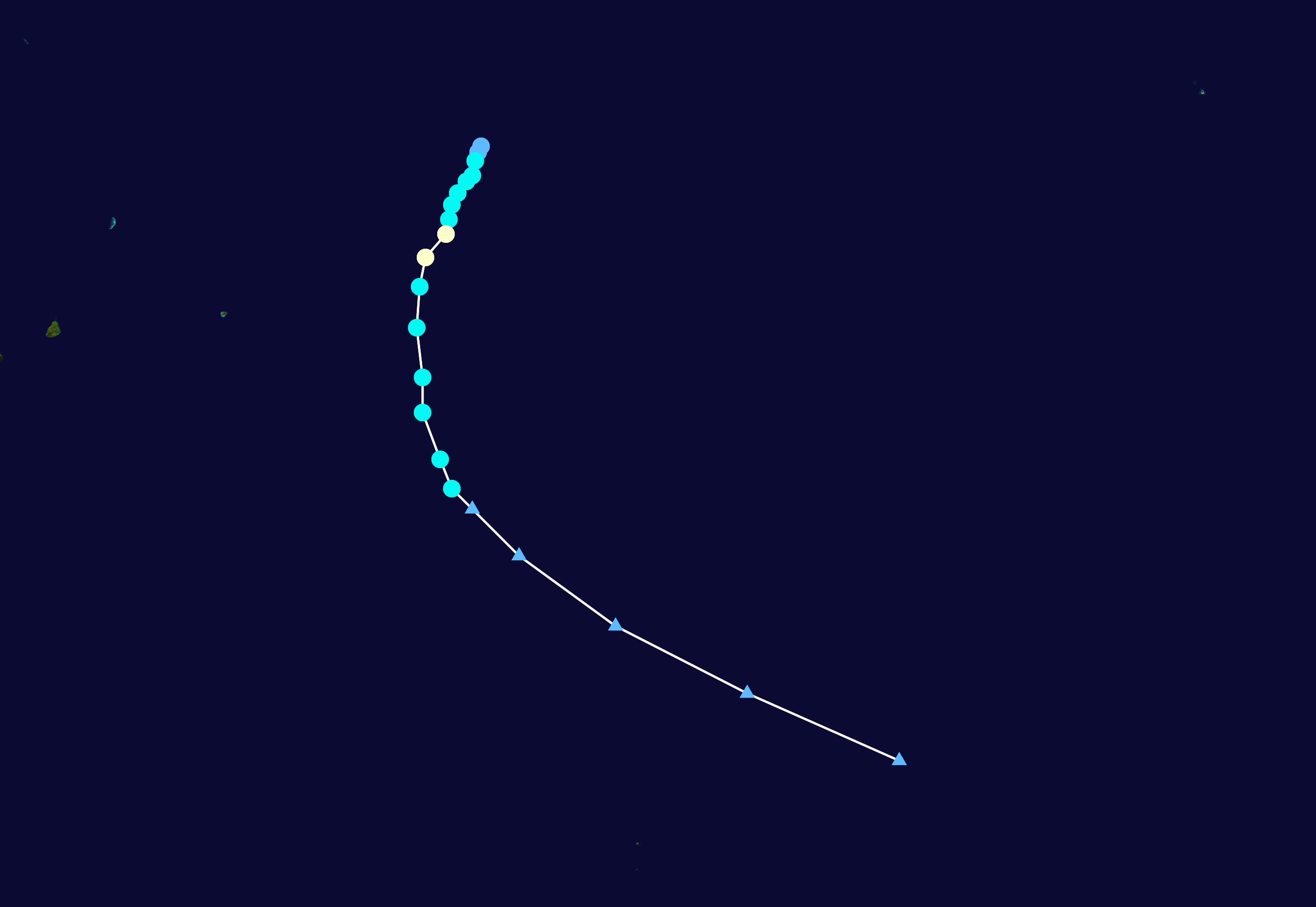
- Duration: March 29 – April 3
- Peak intensity: 120 km/h (75 mph) (1-min);

Ingrid existed from March 29 to April 3. It was monitored as Cyclone 30S by the Joint Typhoon Warning Center.

=== Moderate Tropical Storm Jose ===
- Moderate tropical storm (MFR)
- Tropical storm (SSHWS)
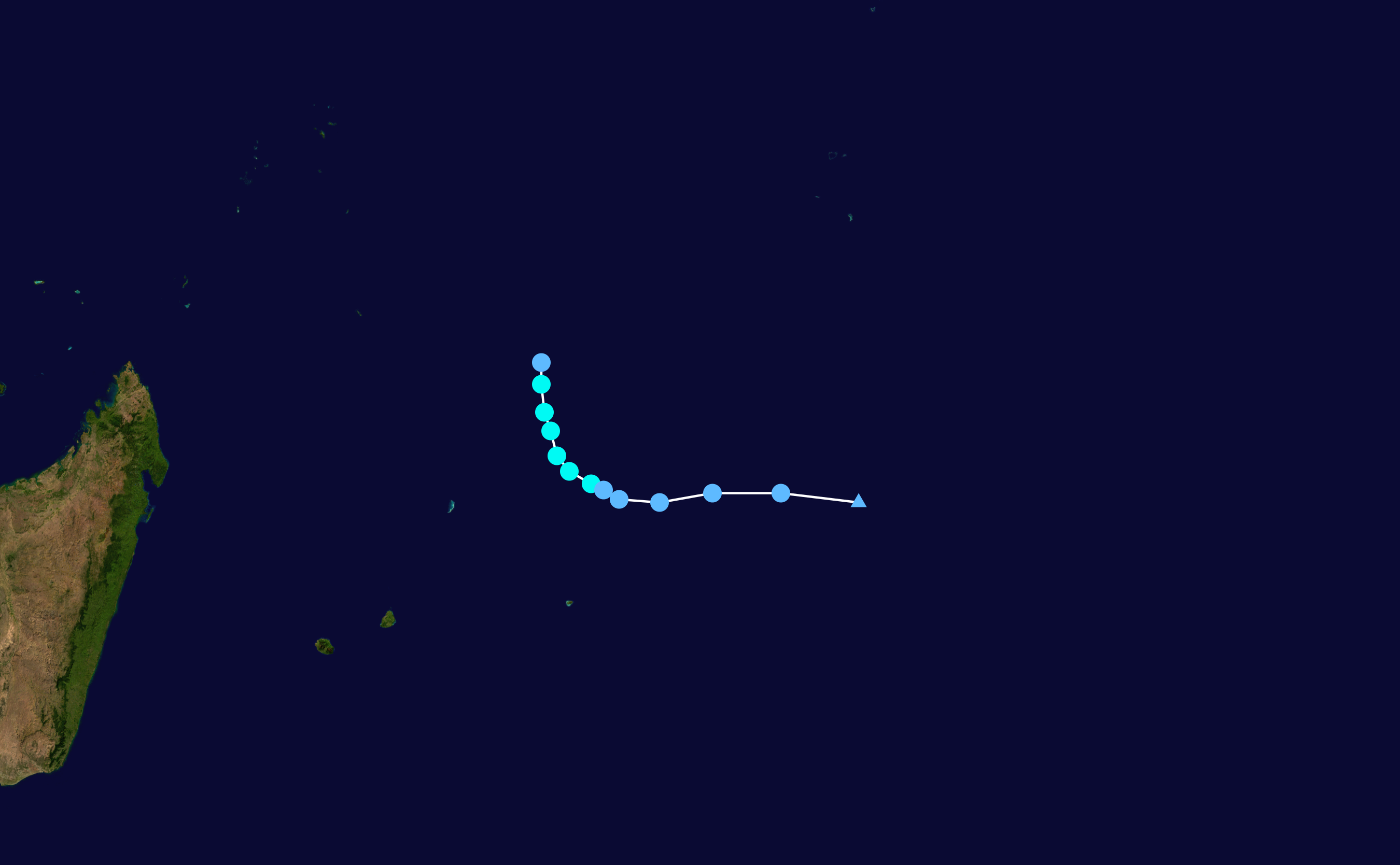
- Duration: April 29 – May 2
- Peak intensity: 75 km/h (45 mph) (10-min);

Jose existed from April 29 to May 2.

=== Moderate Tropical Storm Karen ===
- Moderate tropical storm (MFR)
- Tropical storm (SSHWS)
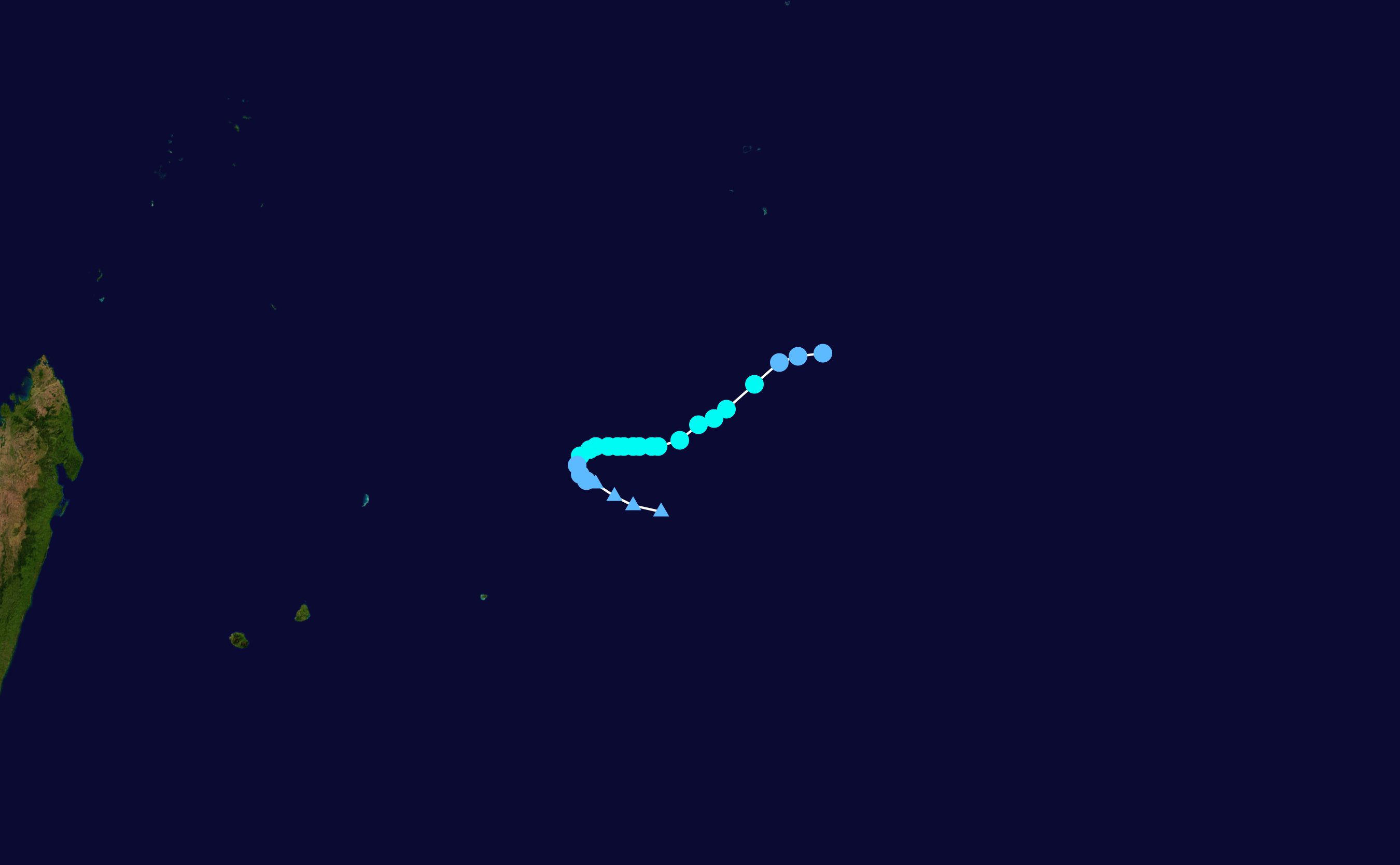
- Duration: May 4 – May 10
- Peak intensity: 85 km/h (50 mph) (10-min);

Karen existed from May 4 to May 10.

== See also ==
- Atlantic hurricane seasons: 1963, 1964
- Eastern Pacific hurricane seasons: 1963, 1964
- Western Pacific typhoon seasons: 1963, 1964
- North Indian Ocean cyclone seasons: 1963, 1964
