= 2006 Pacific hurricane season =

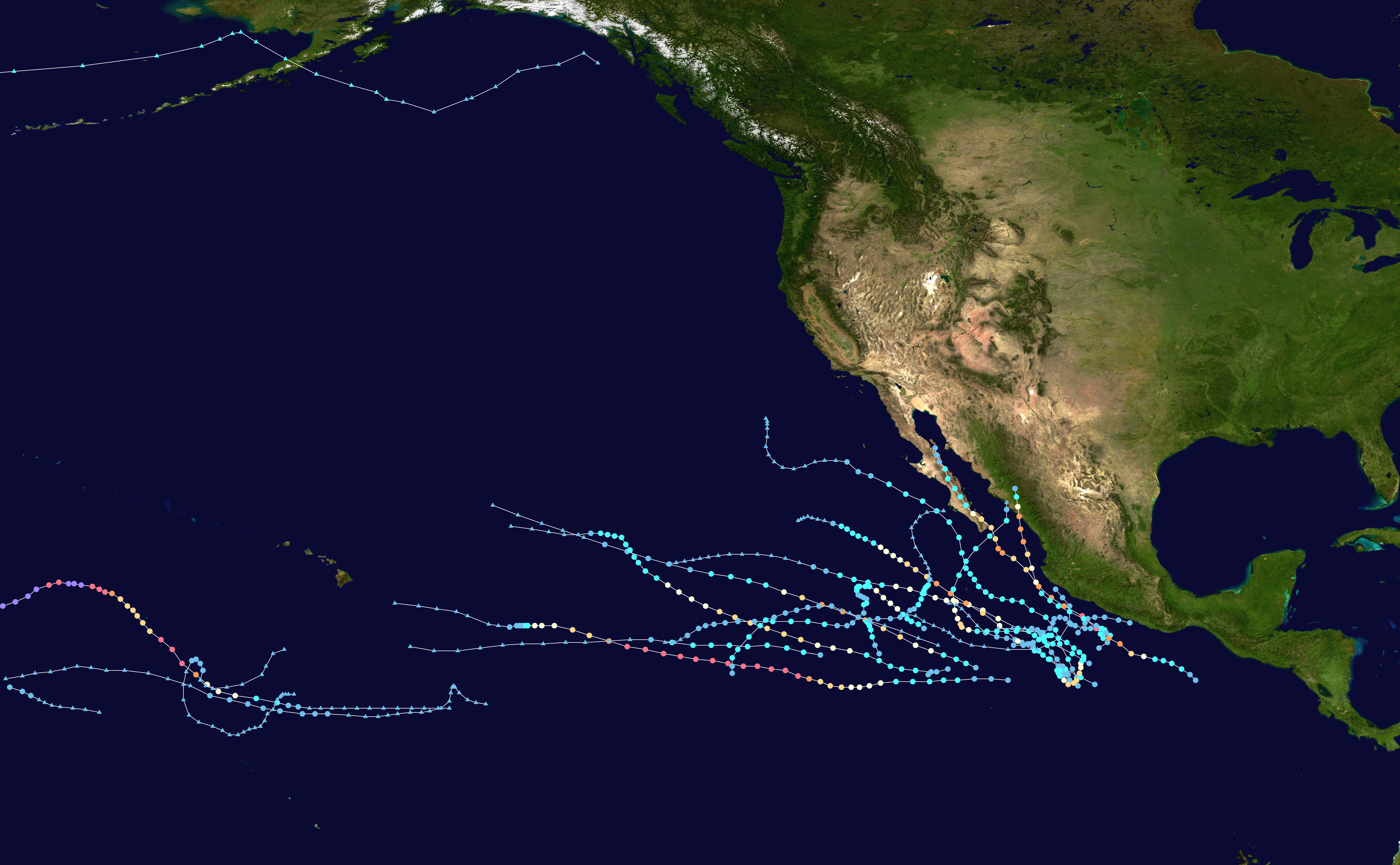
- Season summary map

Seasonal boundaries
- First system formed: May 27, 2006
- Last system dissipated: November 20, 2006

Strongest storm
- Name: Ioke (Most intense hurricane in the Central Pacific)
  - Maximum winds: 160 mph (260 km/h) (1-minute sustained)
  - Lowest pressure: 915 mbar (hPa; 27.02 inHg)

Seasonal statistics
- Total depressions: 25 official, 1 unofficial
- Total storms: 19 official, 1 unofficial
- Hurricanes: 11
- Major hurricanes (Cat. 3+): 6
- ACE: 156.9875 units
- Total fatalities: 14 total
- Total damage: $355.1 million (2006 USD)

Related articles
- Timeline of the 2006 Pacific hurricane season; 2006 Atlantic hurricane season; 2006 Pacific typhoon season; 2006 North Indian Ocean cyclone season

The 2006 Pacific hurricane season was the first above-average season since 1997 which produced twenty-five tropical cyclones, with nineteen named storms, though most were rather weak and short-lived. There were eleven hurricanes, of which six became major hurricanes. Following the inactivity of the previous seasons, forecasters predicted that season would be only slightly above active. It was also the first time since 2003 in which one cyclone of at least tropical storm intensity made landfall. The season officially began on May 15 in the East Pacific Ocean, and on June 1 in the Central Pacific; they ended on November 30. These dates conventionally delimit the period of each year when most tropical cyclones form in the Pacific basin. However, the formation of tropical cyclones is possible at any time of the year.

Seasonal activity began on May 27, when Tropical Storm Aletta formed off the southwest coast of Mexico. The season became active in July when five named storms developed. These included Hurricane Daniel, which was the second strongest storm of the season, as well as Tropical Storm Emilia. During August, Hurricanes Ioke and John formed, as well as four other storms. The strongest storm of the season was Hurricane Ioke, which reached Category 5 status on the Saffir–Simpson scale in the central Pacific Ocean; Ioke passed near Johnston Atoll and later Wake Island, where it caused heavy damage. The deadliest storm of the season was Hurricane John, which killed six people after striking the Baja California Peninsula, and the costliest storm was Hurricane Lane, which caused $203 million in damage in southwestern Mexico (2006 USD, $324 million 2026 USD). Damage across the basin reached $355.1 million (2006 USD), while 14 people were killed by the various storms.

== Seasonal forecast ==
Predictions of tropical activity in the 2006 season
Source	Date	Named storms	Hurricanes	Major hurricanes	Ref
CPC	Average	15.3	8.8	4.2
NOAA	May 22, 2006	12–16	6–8	1–3
	Actual activity	18	10	5

On May 22, 2006, the National Oceanic and Atmospheric Administration's (NOAA) CPC (CPC) released their forecasts for the 2006 Atlantic and Pacific hurricane seasons. The Pacific season was expected to be hindered by the decades-long cycle that began in 1995, which generally increased wind shear across the basin. NOAA predicted a below-normal level of activity in the Eastern Pacific, with 12–16 named storms, of which 6–8 were expected to become hurricanes, and 1–3 expected to become major hurricanes. The Central Pacific Hurricane Center's area of responsibility was also expected to be below average, with only two to three tropical cyclones expected to form or cross into the area. They expected that neither El Niño nor La Niña would affect conditions significantly.

On May 15, the hurricane season began in the Eastern Pacific basin, which is the area of the northern Pacific Ocean east of 140°W. On June 1, the season began in the Central Pacific warning zone (between 140°W and the International Date Line); however, no storms occurred in the region until July.

== Seasonal summary ==
The accumulated cyclone energy (ACE) index for the 2006 Pacific hurricane season as calculated by Colorado State University using data from the National Hurricane Center was 156.9 units. (Note: The total represents the sum of the squares of the maximum sustained wind speed (knots) for every (sub)tropical storm's intensity of over 33 knots (38 mph; 61 km/h), divided by 10,000 while they are above that threshold; therefore, tropical depressions are not included.) Broadly speaking, ACE is a measure of the power of a tropical or subtropical storm multiplied by the length of time it existed. Therefore, a storm with a longer duration, such as Hurricane Ioke, which arrived with a total of 32.2250 units and then crossed to the Western Pacific, will have high values of ACE. It is only calculated for full advisories on specific tropical and subtropical systems reaching or exceeding wind speeds of 39 mph (63 km/h).

Overall, there were 19 tropical storms. In addition, 11 hurricanes developed. Furthermore, there were total of six major hurricanes, Category 3 or greater on the Saffir–Simpson hurricane wind scale. The season officially started on May 15 in the East Pacific Ocean, and on June 1 in the Central Pacific; they both ended on November 30. No tropical storms developed in June in the basin, which was unusual compared to the average of two storms forming during the month.

From 1966 to 2008, there have been only three other seasons in which a tropical storm did not form in June, these being 1969, 2004, 2007 seasons. After such an inactive month, the tropics became active in July when five named storms developed, including Hurricane Daniel which was the second strongest storm of the season. During August, Hurricanes Ioke and John formed, as well as four other storms. September was a relatively quiet month with two storms, of which one was Hurricane Lane. By that time, however, El Niño conditions became established across the Pacific, which is known to enhance Pacific hurricane activity. Three storms developed in October, including Hurricane Paul. Tropical activity within the basin in November 2006 was the most active on record, based on the ACE Index. Three tropical cyclones formed, of which two became tropical storms; only one other season on record at the time, 1961, produced two tropical storms in the month of November. In addition, Mexico was struck by four tropical cyclones in 2006, none on the Atlantic coast and all along the Pacific coast. One hit Baja California Peninsula while the others made landfall on the mainland.

An extratropical storm persisted in the extreme northern central Pacific Ocean in late October. It drifted over unusually warm waters up to 3.6 °F (2 °C) above normal, and gradually developed convection near the center. By November 2, QuikSCAT satellite suggested the system attained winds of up to 60 mph (95 km/h) about 900 mi (1,450 km) west of Oregon. The system also developed an eye and an eyewall. The cyclone tracked northeastward as it gradually weakened, and dissipated on November 4. NASA considered the cyclone to be a subtropical storm. However, as it formed outside of the territory of any monitoring organization, it was not named. Operationally, the United States Navy treated the system as a tropical disturbance, numbered 91C.

== Systems ==
=== Tropical Storm Aletta ===
- Tropical storm (SSHWS)
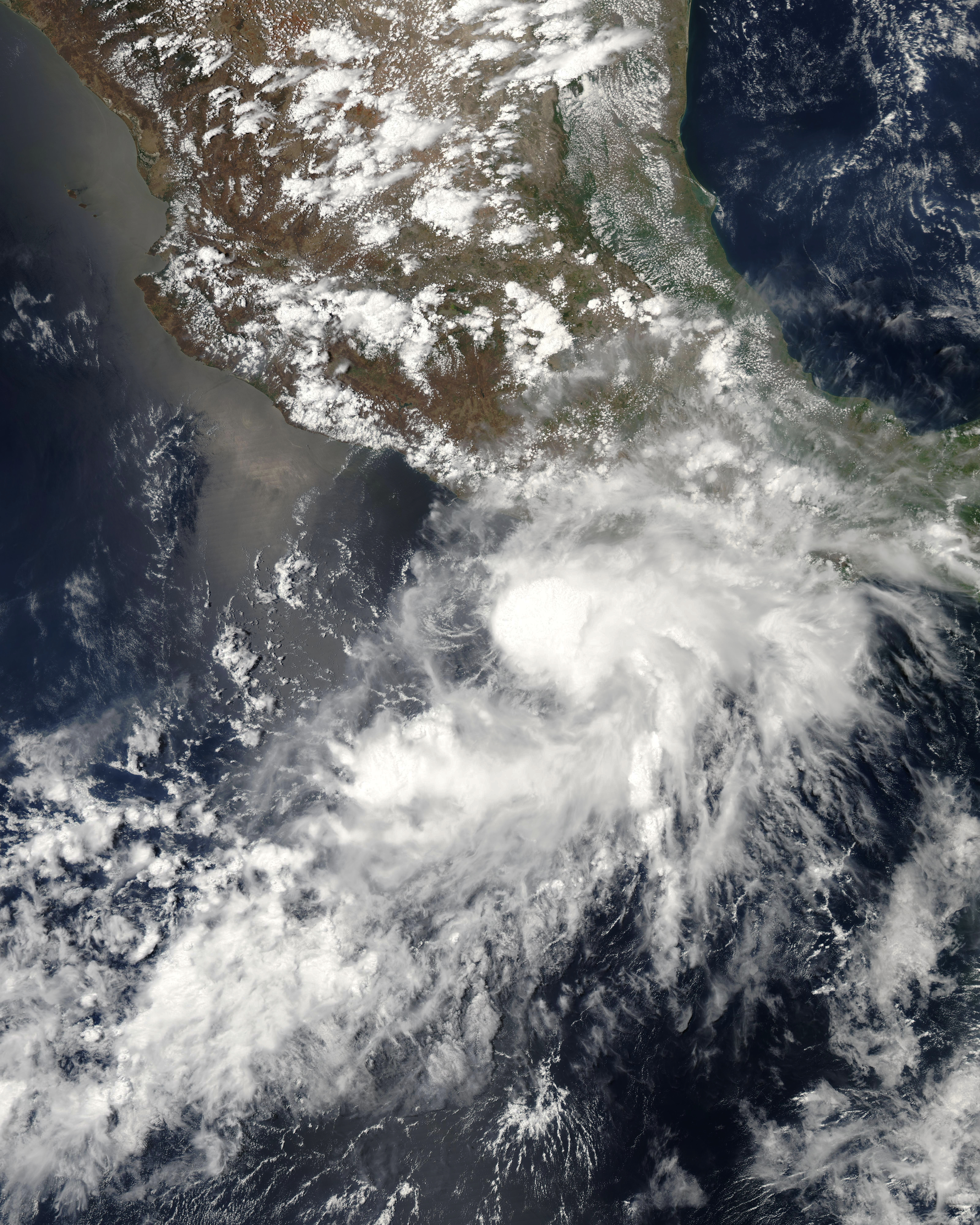
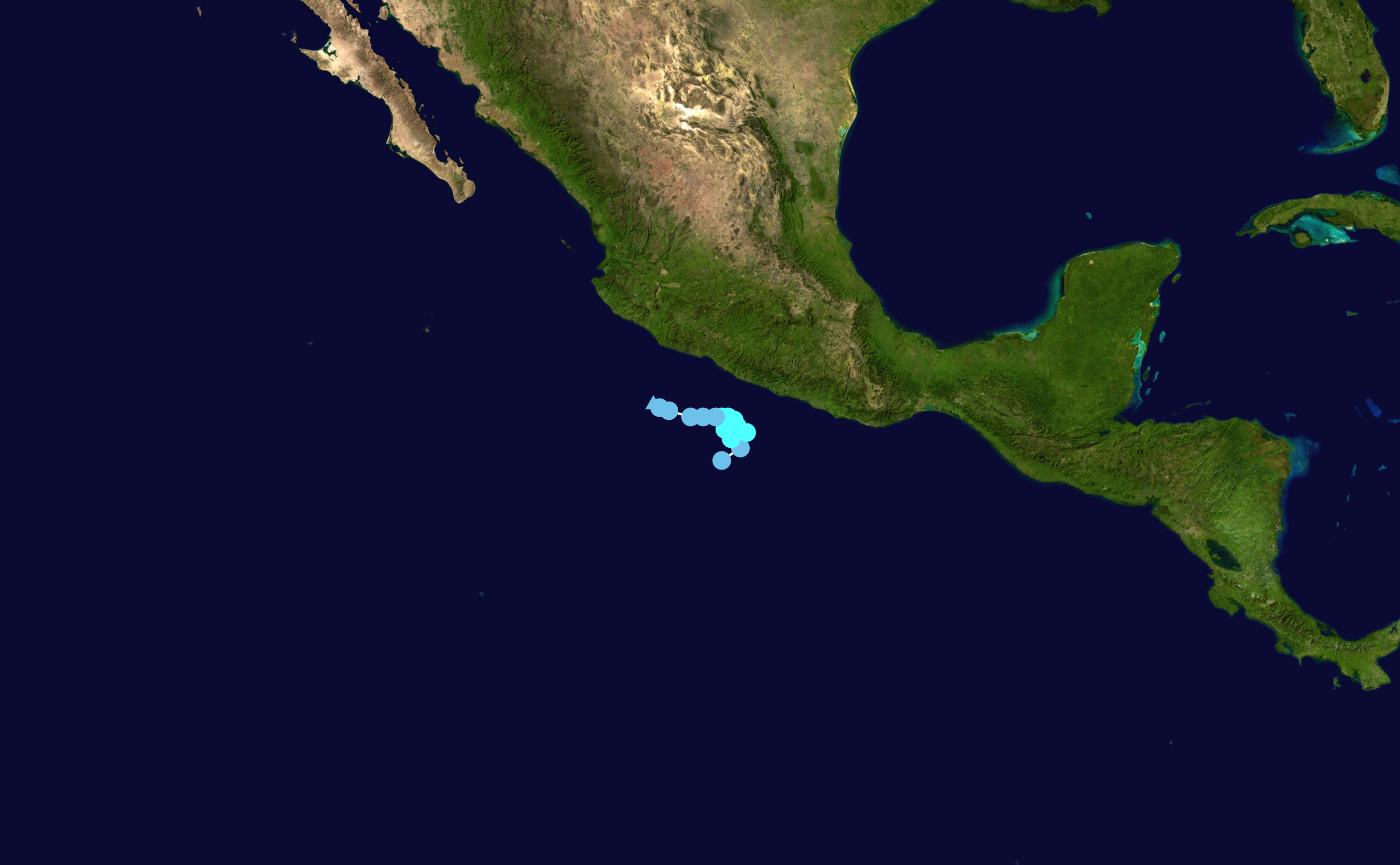
- Duration: May 27 – May 30
- Peak intensity: 45 mph (75 km/h) (1-min); 1002 mbar (hPa)

The first storm of the year had its genesis from a tropical wave that crossed Central America and entered the East Pacific on May 21. The system interacted with a trough near the Gulf of Tehuantepec, causing thunderstorms to increase. A large low-pressure area formed on May 25 south of Mexico, which organized slowly due to wind shear in the region. Early on May 27, the NHC designated the system as Tropical Depression One-E about 190 mi (305 km) south of Acapulco. The nascent storm moved little, and the wind shear displaced the center west of the convection. Late on May 27, the NHC upgraded the depression to Tropical Storm Aletta. While named tropical cyclones in May are infrequent events, Aletta marked the seventh consecutive year to have a named cyclone form in May. The storm drifted for several days off the southern coast of Mexico. The NHC estimated peak winds of 45 mph (70 km/h) on May 28, as the storm presented an elongated cloud structure. Increased wind shear and dry air caused weakening on May 29, and Aletta weakened into a tropical depression. Drifting westward, the system became a remnant low on May 31, and dissipated soon afterward.

The storm moved toward the Guerrero coast in southwestern Mexico, prompting the Mexican government to issue tropical storm watches between Punta Maldonado and Zihuatanejo. Aletta produced moderate rainfall across Mexico, including a 24-hour rainfall total of 100 mm (3.9 in) (Note: Rainfall totals are rounded to the nearest 1/100th of an inch and to the nearest millimetre.) in Jacatepec, Oaxaca, on May 30, and 96 mm (3.8 in) in La Calera, Guerrero, on the next day. High winds knocked down trees and caused minor structural damage. In Zihuatanejo, a ship with nine people was rescued after being reported as lost, which may have been a result of high seas generated by Aletta.

=== Tropical Depression Two-E ===
- Tropical depression (SSHWS)
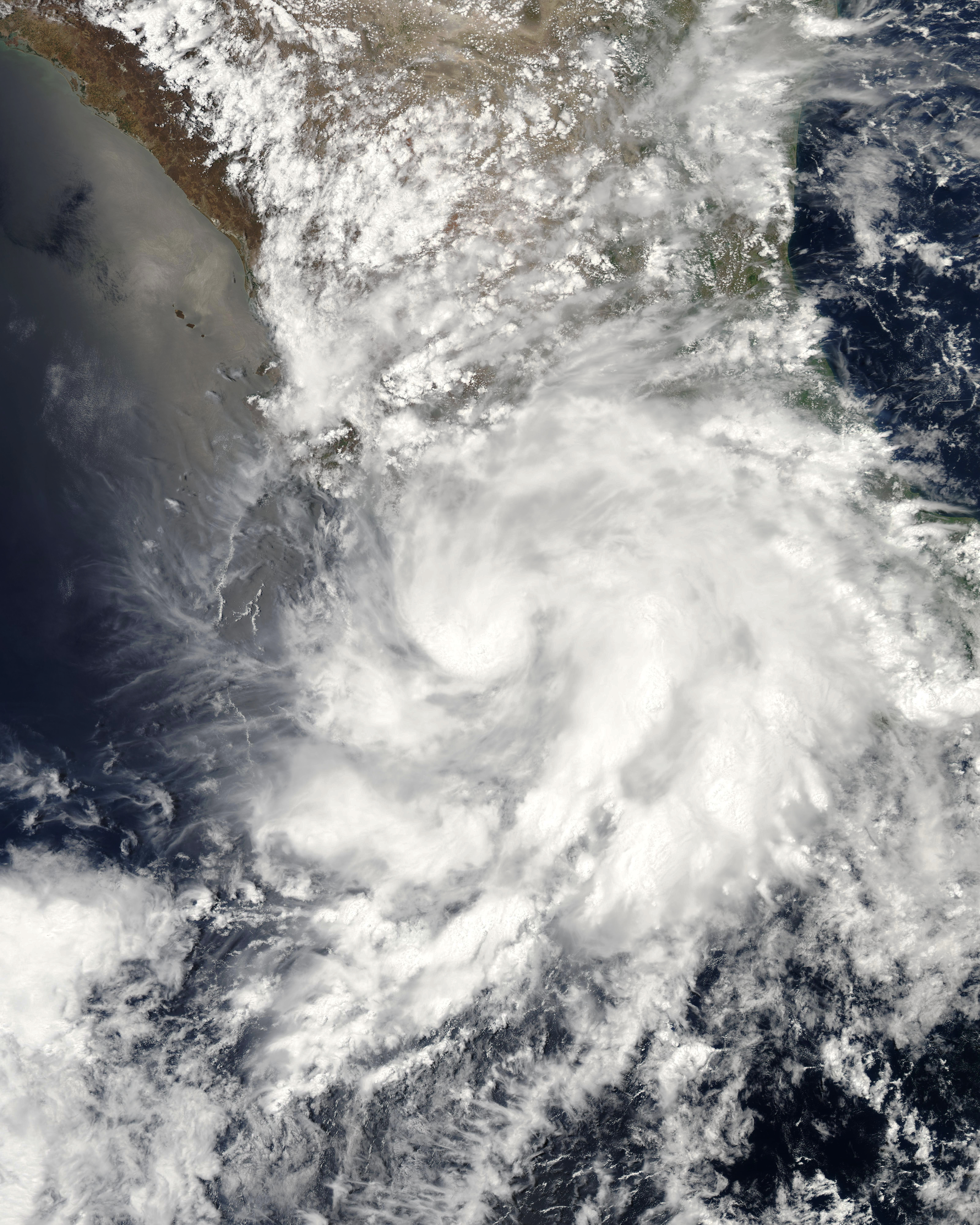
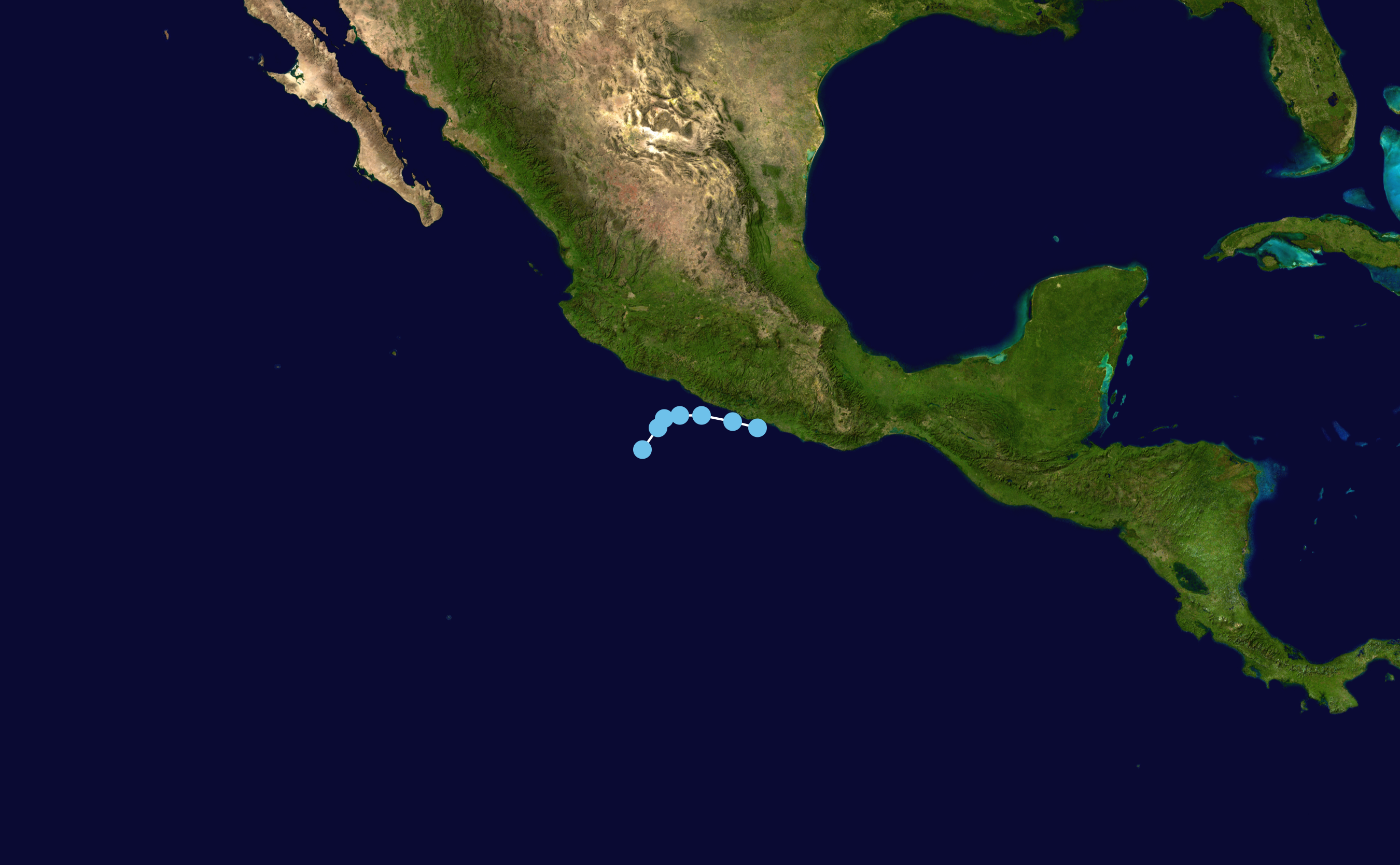
- Duration: June 3 – June 5
- Peak intensity: 35 mph (55 km/h) (1-min); 1005 mbar (hPa)

On the day after Aletta dissipated, a new area of disturbed weather developed off the southwest Mexican coast, associated with a tropical wave. High shear slowed the development of the system, although the thunderstorms eventually organized around a closed circulation. On June 3, the system developed into Tropical Depression Two-E about 140 mi (240 km) southwest of the Mexican coast. Land interaction and the presence of wind shear prevented much development. Early on June 4, convection weakened significantly, leaving the center partially exposed. Early on June 5, the circulation dissipated, and later that night the remnants moved inland.

Due to uncertainty in whether the depression would attain tropical storm status or not, the government of Mexico issued a tropical storm warning from Punta San Telmo, Michoacán to Acapulco, Guerrero. Prior to affecting the coastline, the Mexican meteorological agency issued a heavy rainfall advisory, also mentioning the potential for flooding and mudslides, for the states of Jalisco, Colima, Michoacán, Guerrero, and Oaxaca. Officials prepared 21 shelters in the region. The depression produced heavy rainfall along the coastline, including a total of 19.1 inches (486 mm) measured in a 48‑hour period in Acapulco. Totals of over 2 inches (50 mm) spread across much of Guerrero and Oaxaca, causing flash flooding and mudslides. The storm partially flooded about 40 houses, and a total of 72 people were forced to leave their homes. In Acapulco, floodwaters washed trash from street corners onto the beaches. Elsewhere in Guerrero, the flooding and mudslides blocked several highways, which stranded dozens of vehicles. The wall of a prison collapsed due to the rainfall. Also in Acapulco, the rainfall downed trees and power lines, causing power outages and sparking a fire when a transformer exploded.

=== Hurricane Bud ===
- Category 3 hurricane (SSHWS)
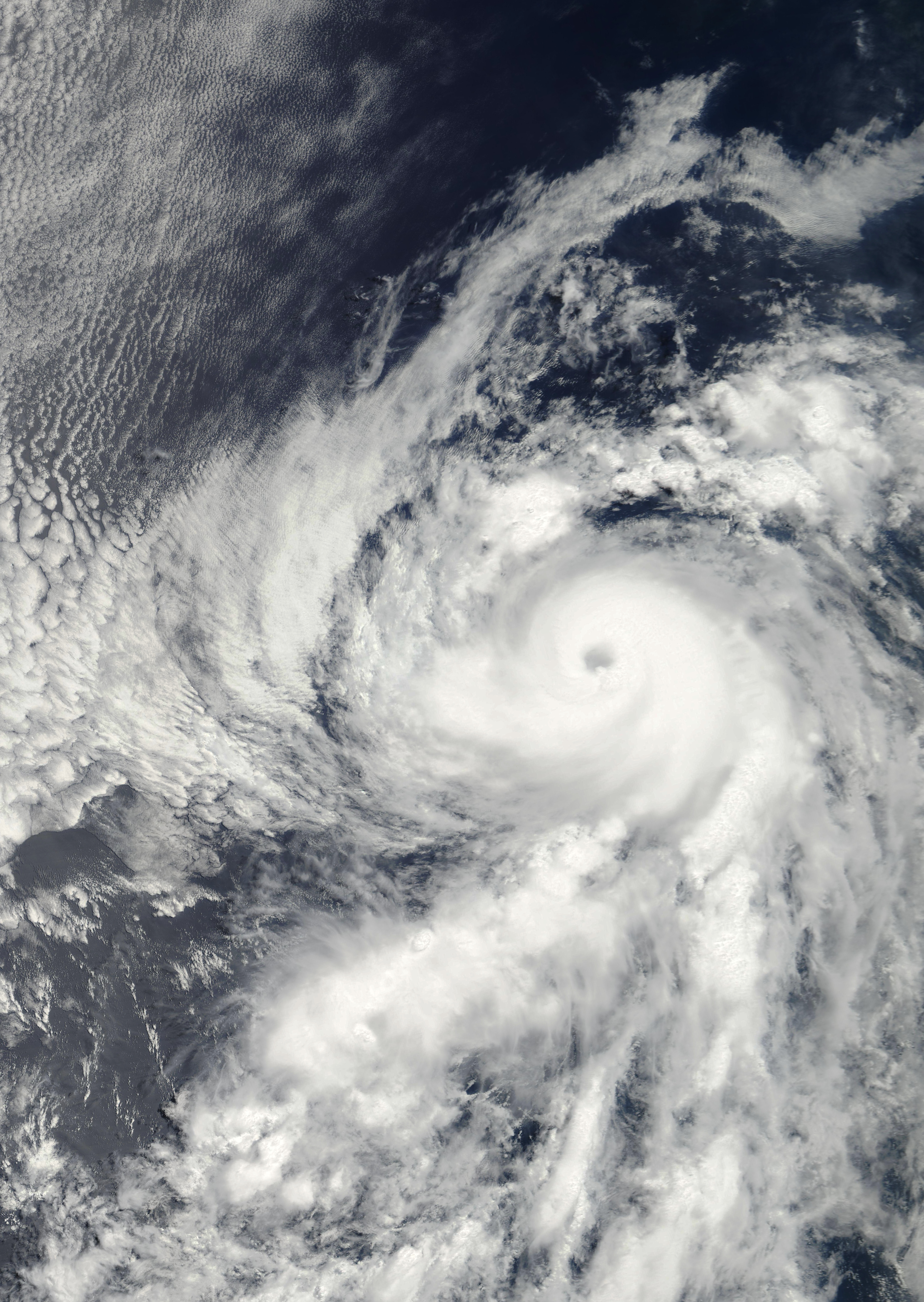
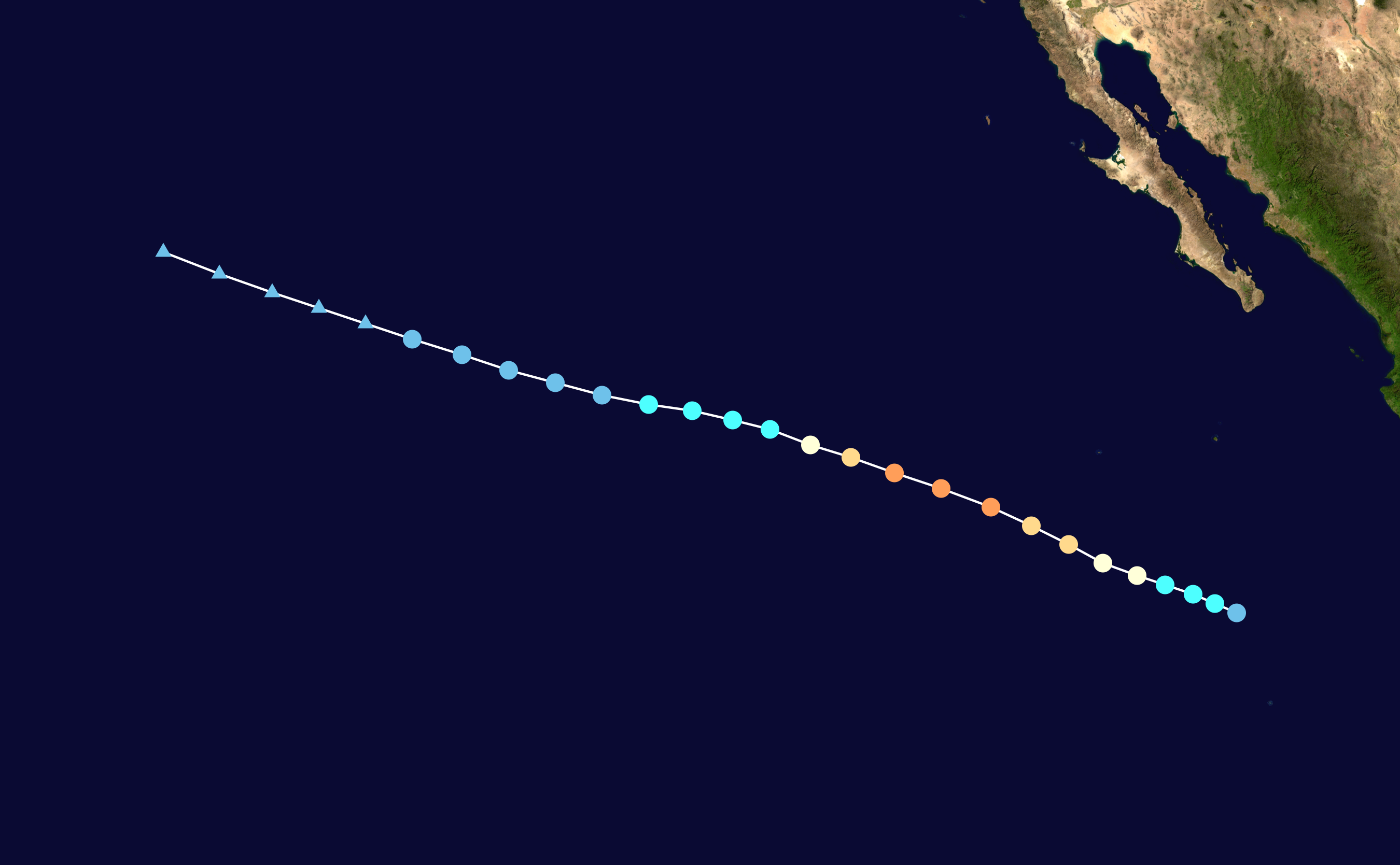
- Duration: July 11 – July 16
- Peak intensity: 125 mph (205 km/h) (1-min); 953 mbar (hPa)

A tropical wave exited the west coast of Africa on June 27, which reached the eastern Pacific on July 7. The system spawned a low-pressure area south of Mexico. Associated convection gradually became better organized, and the system organized into Tropical Depression Three-E early on July 11. Steered by a subtropical ridge over Mexico, the storm tracked west-northwestward for its entirety. Located over warm waters, the depression intensified into Tropical Storm Bud within six hours of its formation. The thunderstorms organized, with good outflow except to the east due to the presence of Tropical Storm Carlotta. On July 12, the NHC upgraded Bud to a hurricane, after an eye developed in the storm's center. Later on July 12, Bud was upgraded to a Category 2 hurricane on the Saffir–Simpson hurricane scale.

Early on July 13, Bud became a Category 3 hurricane, or a major hurricane. At that time, the well-defined eye was enclosed by a ring of deep thunderstorms. That day, the hurricane reached its peak intensity of 125 mph (200 km/h) and a minimum barometric pressure of 953 mbar (28.1 inHg). Bud encountered cooler waters and stable air, and a period of rapid weakening began. The eye became obscured, and core convective cloud tops began to warm, until much of the convection was lost on July 14, impeded by southeasterly wind shear. On July 15, Bud was downgraded to a tropical depression, and the next day it degenerated into a remnant low. The low fully dissipated on July 17 about 750 mi (1,210 km) east-northeast of Hawaii. The remnants of Bud produced light rainfall across Hawaii.

=== Hurricane Carlotta ===
- Category 1 hurricane (SSHWS)
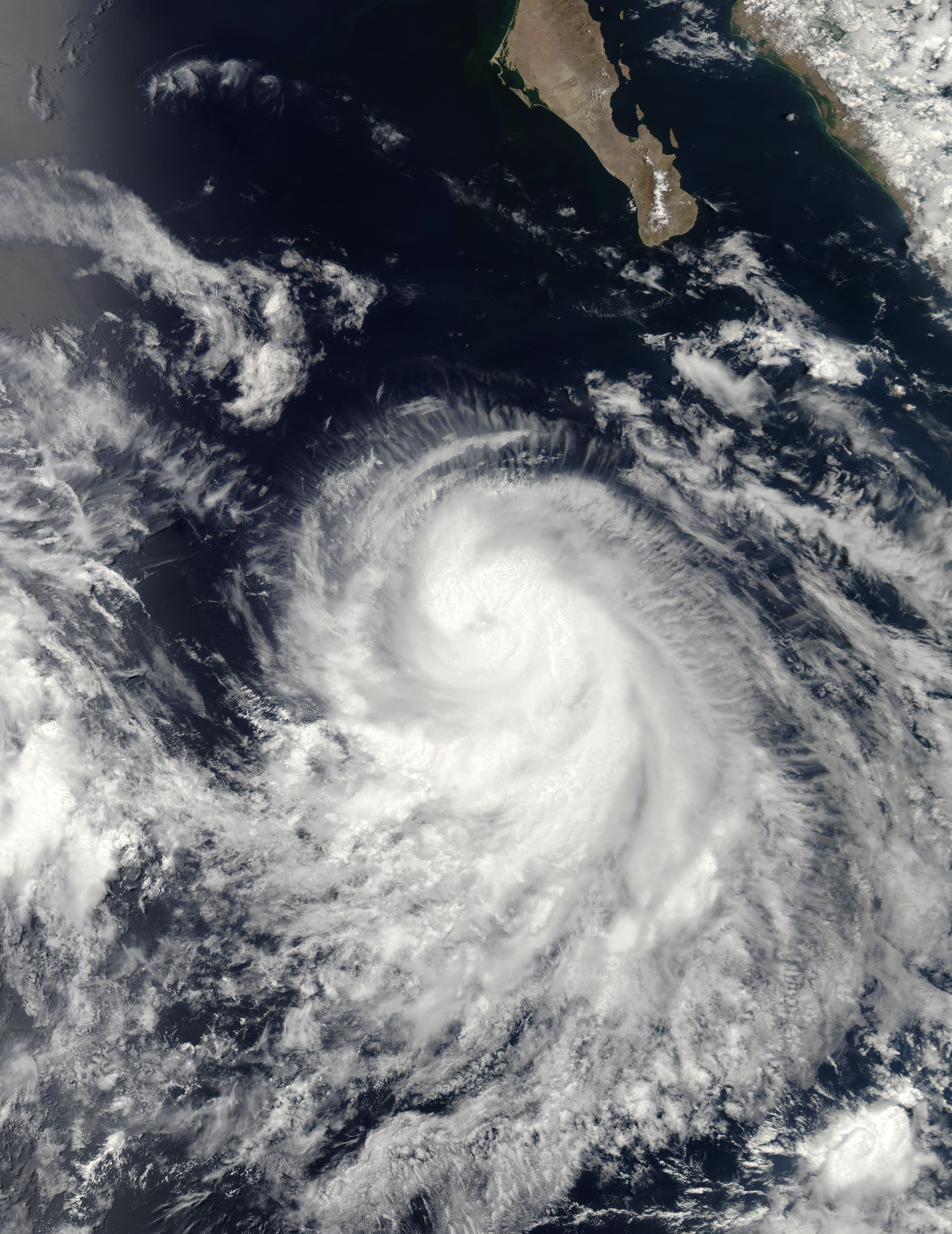
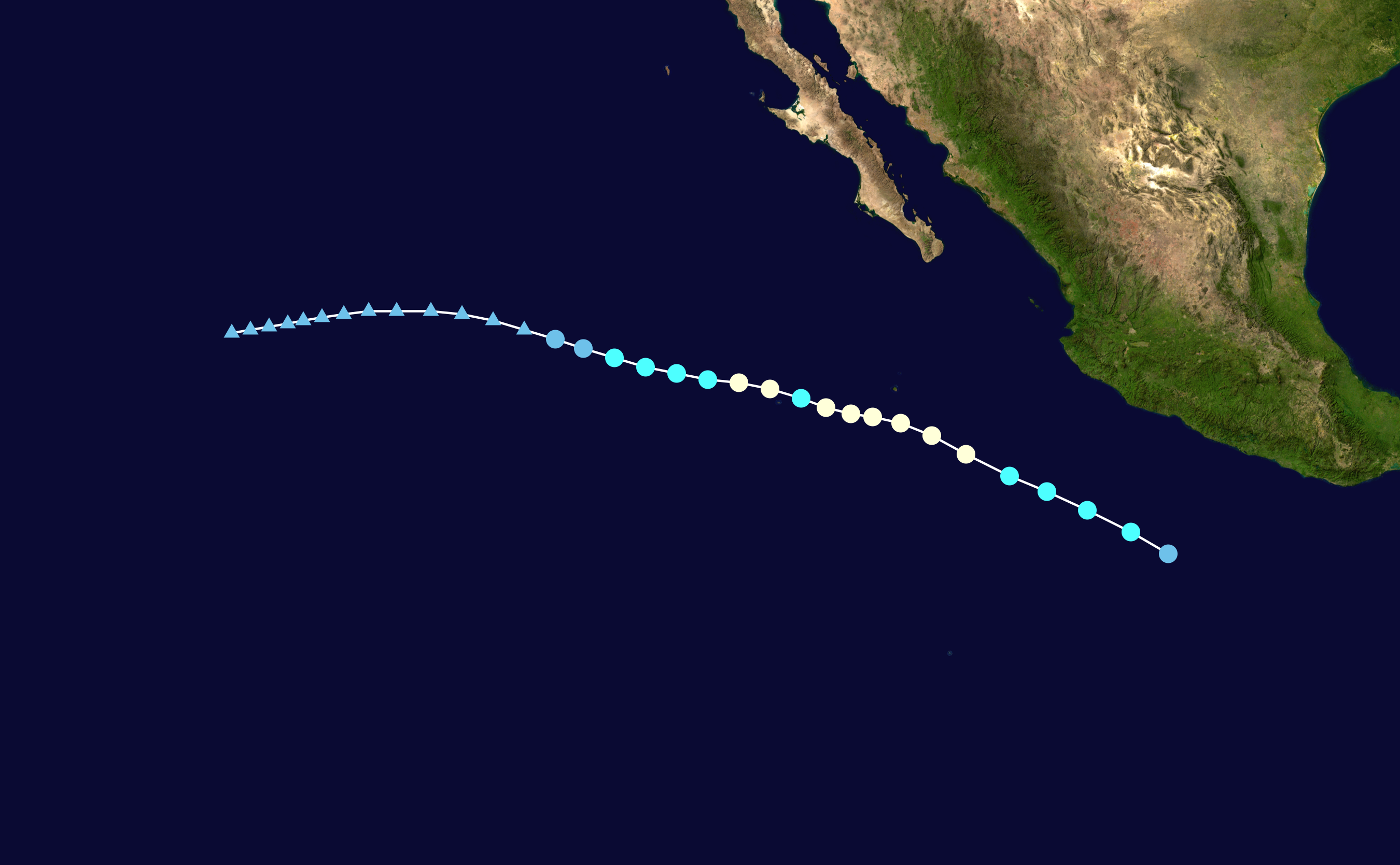
- Duration: July 12 – July 16
- Peak intensity: 85 mph (140 km/h) (1-min); 981 mbar (hPa)

A tropical wave exited Africa on June 30 and moved across the Atlantic Ocean without development. On July 9, while crossing Central America into the eastern North Pacific Ocean, thunderstorm activity increased, and the system organized into Tropical Depression Four-E early on July 12 about 290 mi (465 km) south of Zihuatanejo, Guerrero. The large depression moved quickly to the west-northwest to the south of a ridge over northwestern Mexico, and its outer rainbands moved across the coast. Rainfall totals were less than 1 inch (25 mm). The depression intensified into Tropical Storm Carlotta just six hours after forming. By late on July 12, the storm developed banding features, and early on July 13 Carlotta attained hurricane status about 430 mi (690 km) south of the southern tip of the Baja California peninsula.

As Carlotta intensified, the system became more compact, and it reached peak winds of 85 mph (135 km/h) on July 13. An eye formed in the center, and the hurricane was briefly forecast to attain major hurricane status, or a Category 3 on the Saffir–Simpson scale. However, Carlotta weakened due to increased wind shear from Hurricane Bud to its west, and the eye and convection deteriorated. Carlotta briefly weakened to tropical storm status late on July 14, although a decrease in shear allowed it to reintensify into a hurricane. This was short-lived as the center moved into the area of cooler waters, and Carlotta again weakened to tropical storm status. Late on July 15, the circulation became separated from the convection, and Carlotta weakened to tropical depression status on July 16, and the next day generated into a remnant low. The circulation continued generally westward, dissipating on July 20 about 1,500 mi (2,415 km) east of the Hawaiian islands.

=== Hurricane Daniel ===
- Category 4 hurricane (SSHWS)
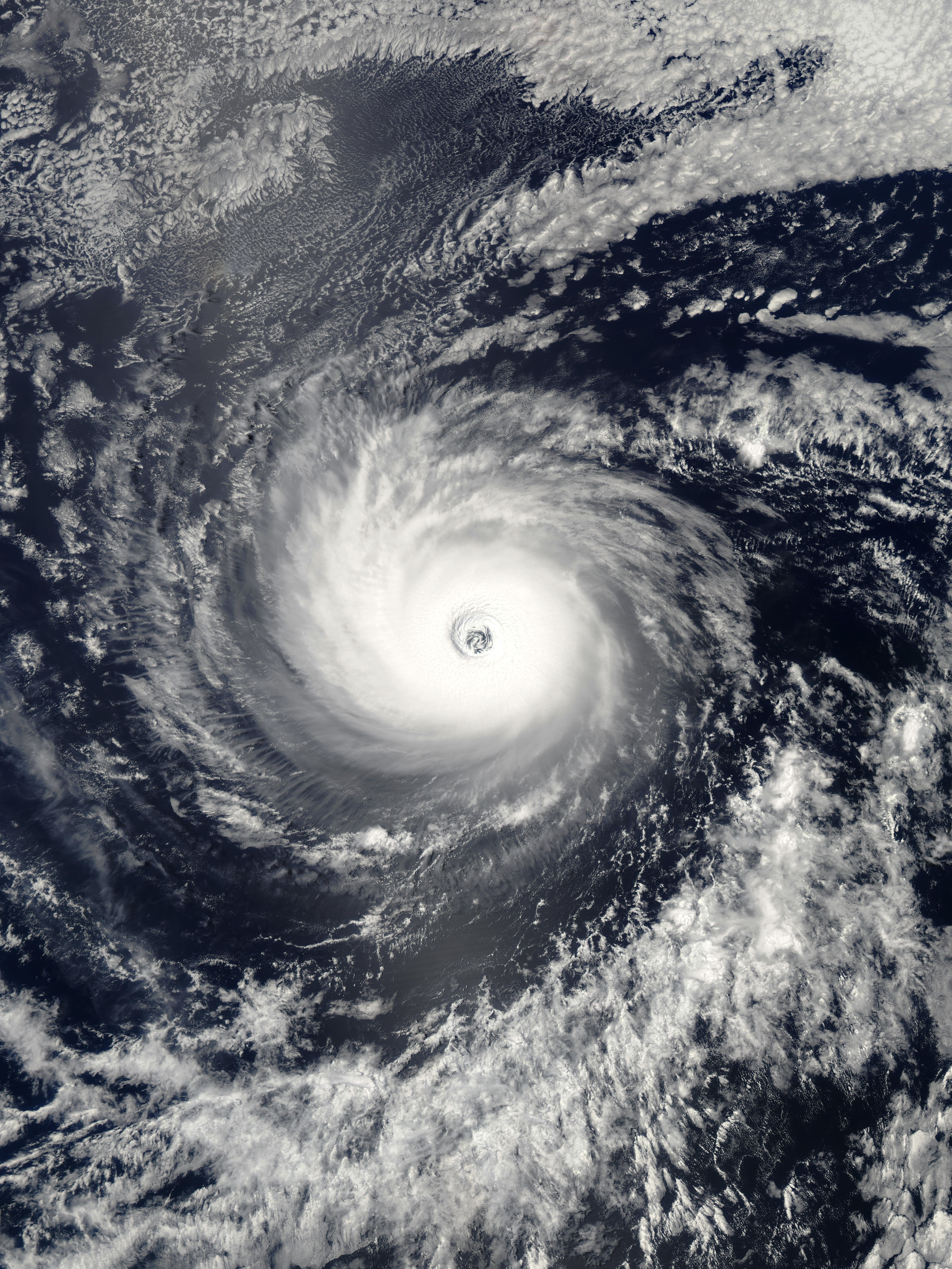
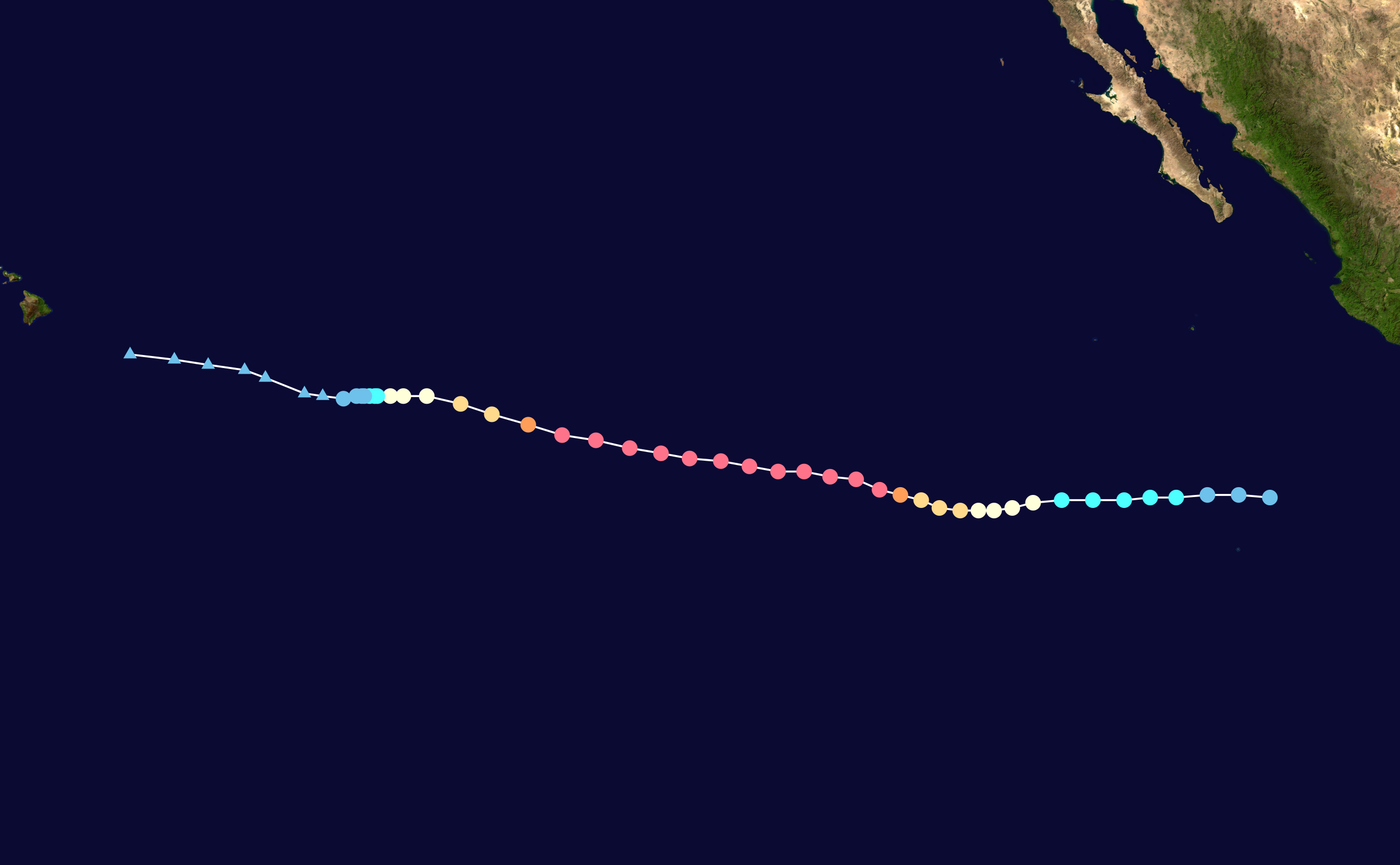
- Duration: July 16 – July 26
- Peak intensity: 150 mph (240 km/h) (1-min); 933 mbar (hPa)

A tropical wave exited the west coast of Africa on July 2, which crossed into the eastern Pacific Ocean ten days later. Convection increased and slowly organized as the system moved westward, steered by a mid-level ridge. With convective rainbands near an associated low-level circulation, the system developed into a tropical depression late on July 16, located about 525 miles (845 km) south-southwest of Manzanillo, Colima. Conditions favored further development, including warm sea surface temperatures, very low amounts of wind shear, and an established anticyclone. On July 17, the depression strengthened into Tropical Storm Daniel, as outflow improved and banding features developed. The thunderstorms organized into a central dense overcast, and in the center, an eye developed. Late on July 18, Daniel attained hurricane status. It underwent an eyewall replacement cycle, temporarily halting its intensification trend. Daniel restrengthened and attained major hurricane status on July 20. The structure evolved into an annular hurricane, with a large and large eye 30 mi (45 km) in diameter. On July 21, the hurricane underwent another eyewall replacement cycle. Afterward, Daniel attained peak winds of 150 mph (240 km/h) early on July 22, making it a strong Category 4 hurricane on the Saffir-Simpson scale. It maintained peak winds for about 18 hours before weakening due to cooler waters. Daniel entered the Central Pacific on July 24. It decelerated as the ridge to its north weakened, and due to the combination of cool waters and increasing easterly shear, Daniel weakened to a tropical storm on July 25. The thunderstorms dwindled, and Daniel fell to tropical depression status on July 26. A day later, it degenerated into a remnant low, which dissipated just southeast of the Big Island of Hawaii on July 28.

Daniel's remnants moved across the Hawaiian islands, dropping heavy rainfall and causing flooding. West Wailuaiki on Maui recorded 3.87 inches (98 mm) in one day, which was the highest daily rainfall total from the hurricane. The storm also dropped precipitation on the East Maui watershed. The rainfall particularly in Kailua-Kona on the Big Island caused ponding on roadways, as well as flooding of small streams. A station in Ka Lae briefly reported sustained winds of about 35 mph (56 km/h) with gusts to 45 mph (72 km/h).

=== Tropical Storm Emilia ===
- Tropical storm (SSHWS)
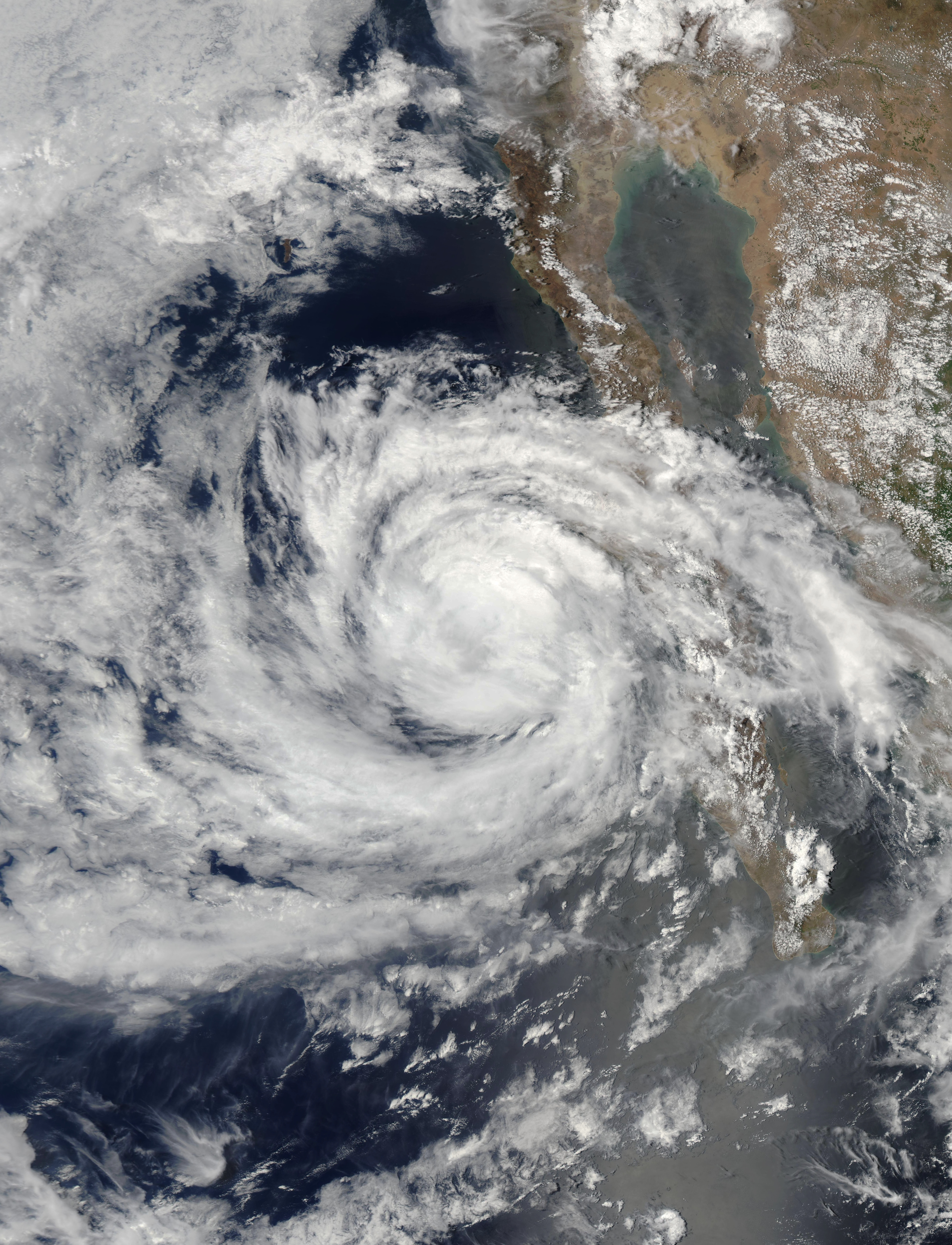
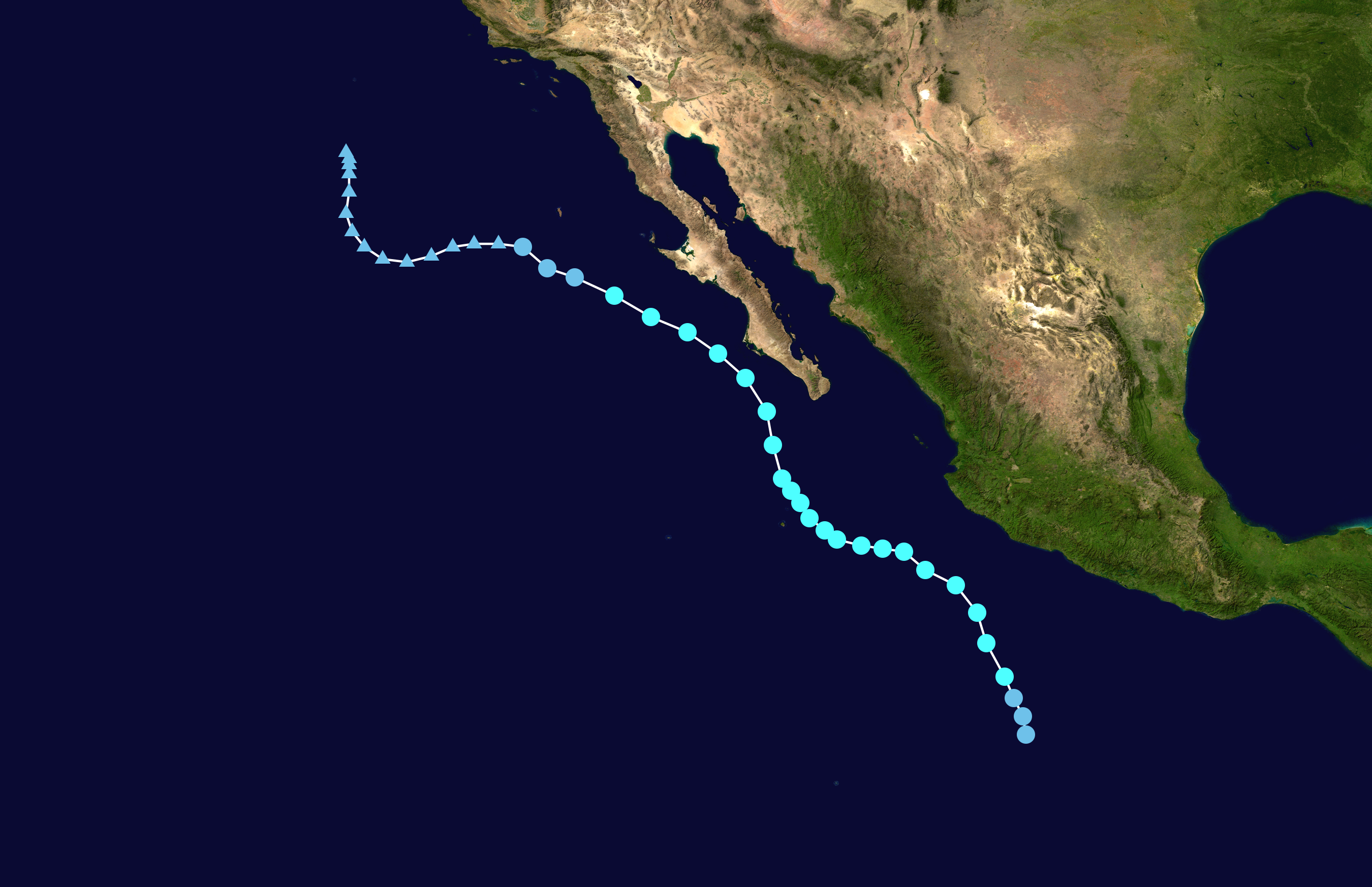
- Duration: July 21 – July 28
- Peak intensity: 65 mph (100 km/h) (1-min); 990 mbar (hPa)

The origins of Emilia were from a tropical wave that developed into a tropical depression on July 21, a short distance off the coast of Acapulco. It moved generally north-northwestward, reaching tropical storm status on July 22 and passing about 175 mi (280 km) southwest of Manzanillo, Colima. An eyewall began to form that day, and Emilia reached peak winds of 65 mph (105 km/h). It briefly weakened due to wind shear, although restrengthening occurred as the storm turned toward the Baja California peninsula. On July 26, Emilia again reached peak winds of 65 mph (105 km/h), and shortly thereafter it passed about 60 mi (95 km) southwest of the southern tip of Baja California. It weakened as it turned into cooler waters, first to tropical depression status on July 27 and then to a convective-less remnant low on July 28. The remnants dissipated on July 31 about 495 mi (795 km) west-southwest of San Diego, California.

In southwestern Mexico, Emilia produced tropical storm force winds along the coastline. Rainfall in the southern portion of the Baja California peninsula caused minor flooding, and gusty winds caused damage to buildings and power lines. Moisture from Emilia reached the southwestern United States. Thunderstorms and rainfall occurred across Arizona, causing flooding. In southern California, the storm dropped light rainfall, which assisted firefighters in containing a wildfire.

=== Tropical Storm Fabio ===
- Tropical storm (SSHWS)
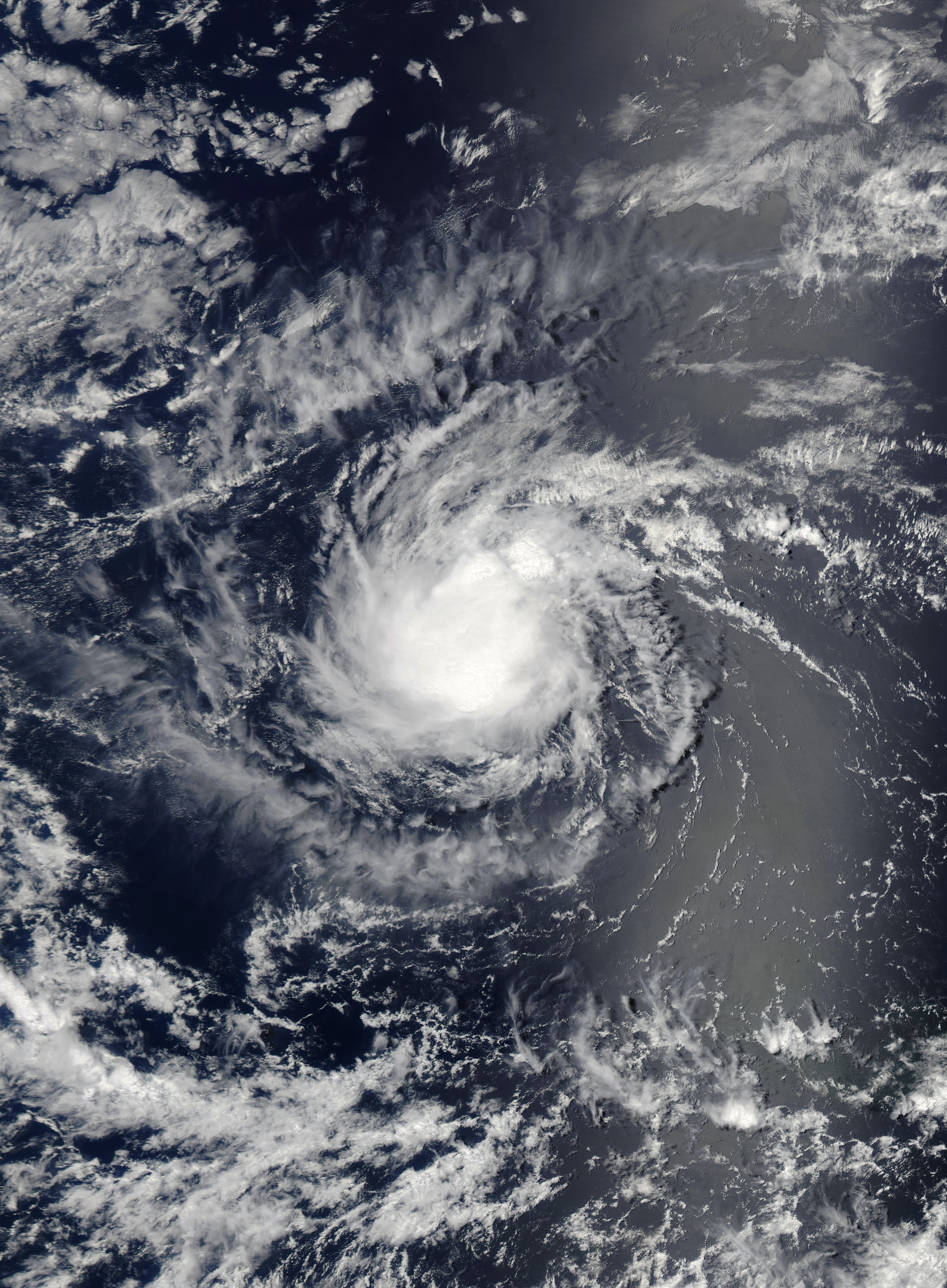
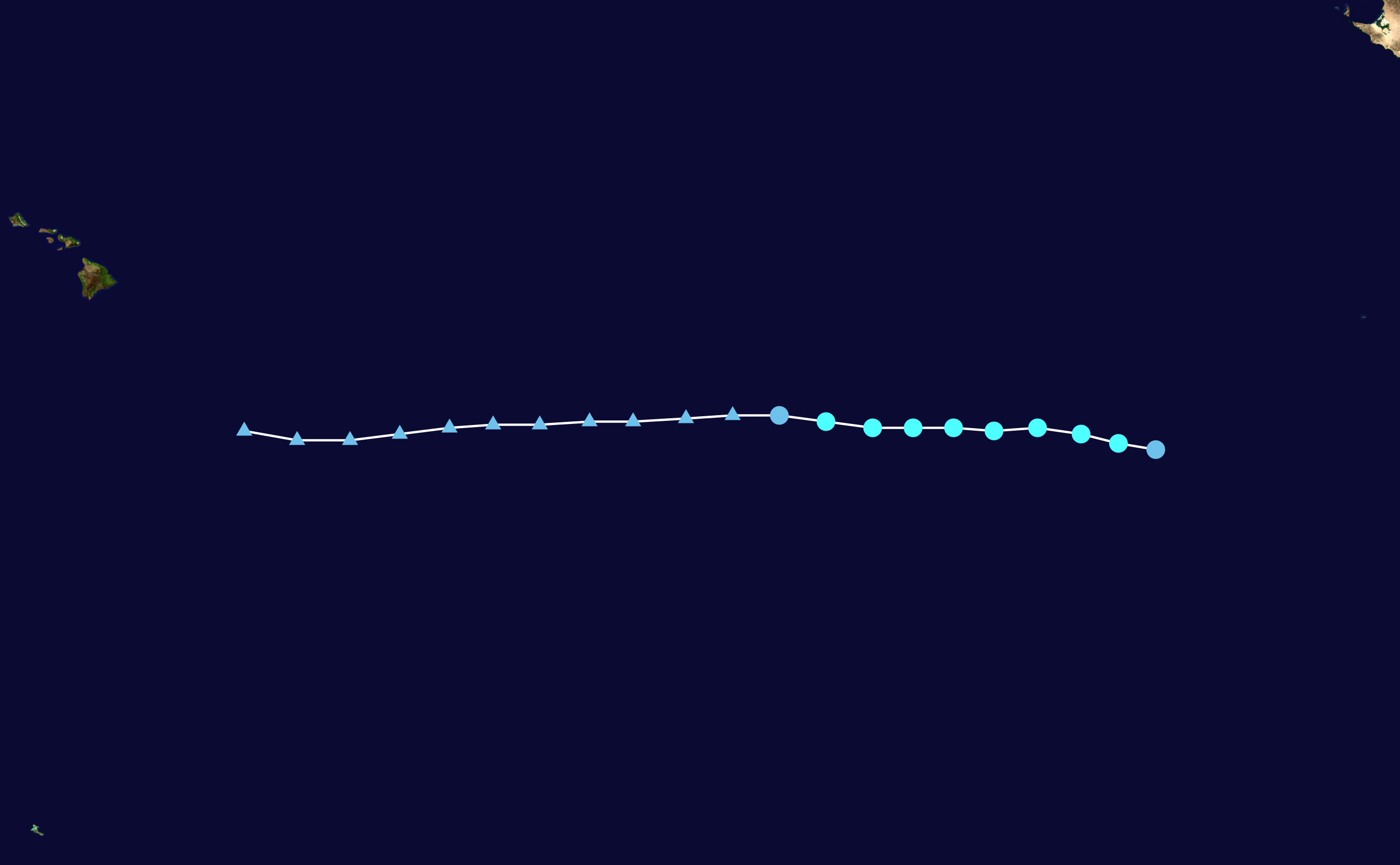
- Duration: July 31 – August 3
- Peak intensity: 50 mph (85 km/h) (1-min); 1000 mbar (hPa)

A tropical wave crossed the west coast of Africa on July 15 and entered the Pacific on July 25. Convection increased on July 28, and at 1800 UTC on July 31 the system became Tropical Depression Seven-E about 980 miles (1,580 km) southwest of the southern tip of the Baja California peninsula. Six hours later, the depression was upgraded to Tropical Storm Fabio. It moved westward due to a ridge to its north, and on August 1 Fabio reached peak winds of 50 mph (80 km/h). Later, the storm began weakening due to increased wind shear and dry air. On August 3, Fabio deteriorated to tropical depression status, and later that day it degenerated into a remnant low-pressure area. The remnants continued westward, moving across Hawaii on August 7.

Although Fabio did not impact land, its remnants produced heavy rainfall in Hawaii. In a 24-hour period, 2.89 inches (73 mm) of rainfall was recorded at Glenwood on the island of Hawaii; this was the highest daily rainfall total for the month on the island. However, the heaviest precipitation fell on Mount Waiʻaleʻale on Kauai, where 15.08 inches (383 mm) fell in 24 hours; this total alone was greater than all other monthly rainfall totals in the state. The heavy rainfall flooded the Hanalei River, which forced the closure of the Kuhio Highway when a bridge was inundated. On Oahu, the rainfall caused ponding on roadways and flooding along streams. One flooded stream stranded 24 hikers along a trail, all of whom required rescue by helicopter.

=== Tropical Storm Gilma ===
- Tropical storm (SSHWS)
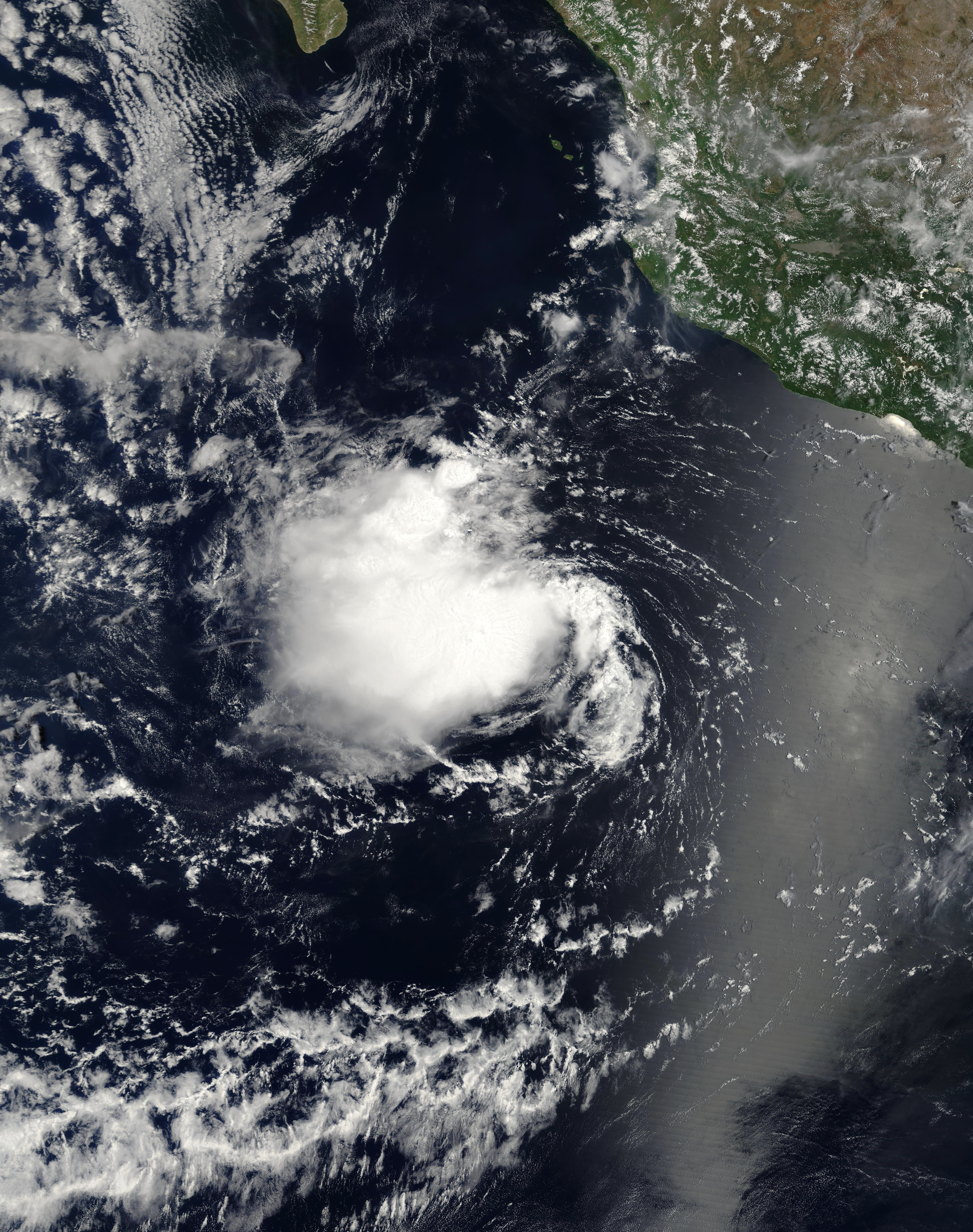
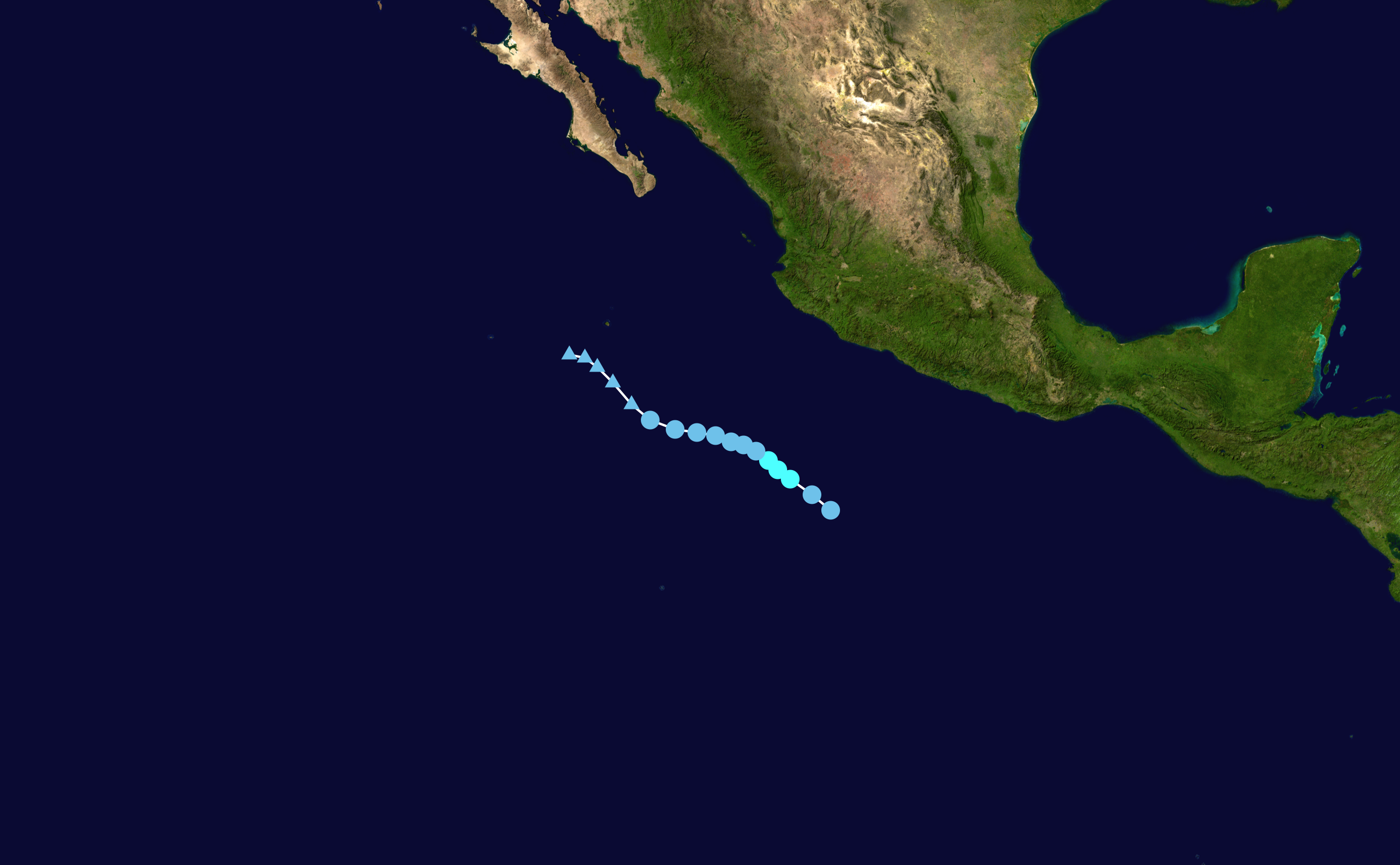
- Duration: August 1 – August 3
- Peak intensity: 40 mph (65 km/h) (1-min); 1004 mbar (hPa)

On July 17, a tropical wave exited Africa and crossed the Atlantic without developing. On July 25 it entered the Eastern Pacific, gradually developing an area of organized convection. Despite marginally favorable upper-level winds, the system organized enough to be declared a tropical depression on August 1, several hundred miles southwest of Acapulco, Mexico. Initially, the depression tracked west-northwestward. Despite wind shear in the area, the depression was upgraded to Tropical Storm Gilma later on August 1. The wind shear prevented further strengthening or organization, and Gilma weakened to a tropical depression early on August 2. The depression turned westward, and Gilma degenerated into a remnant low by August 4.

=== Hurricane Hector ===
- Category 2 hurricane (SSHWS)
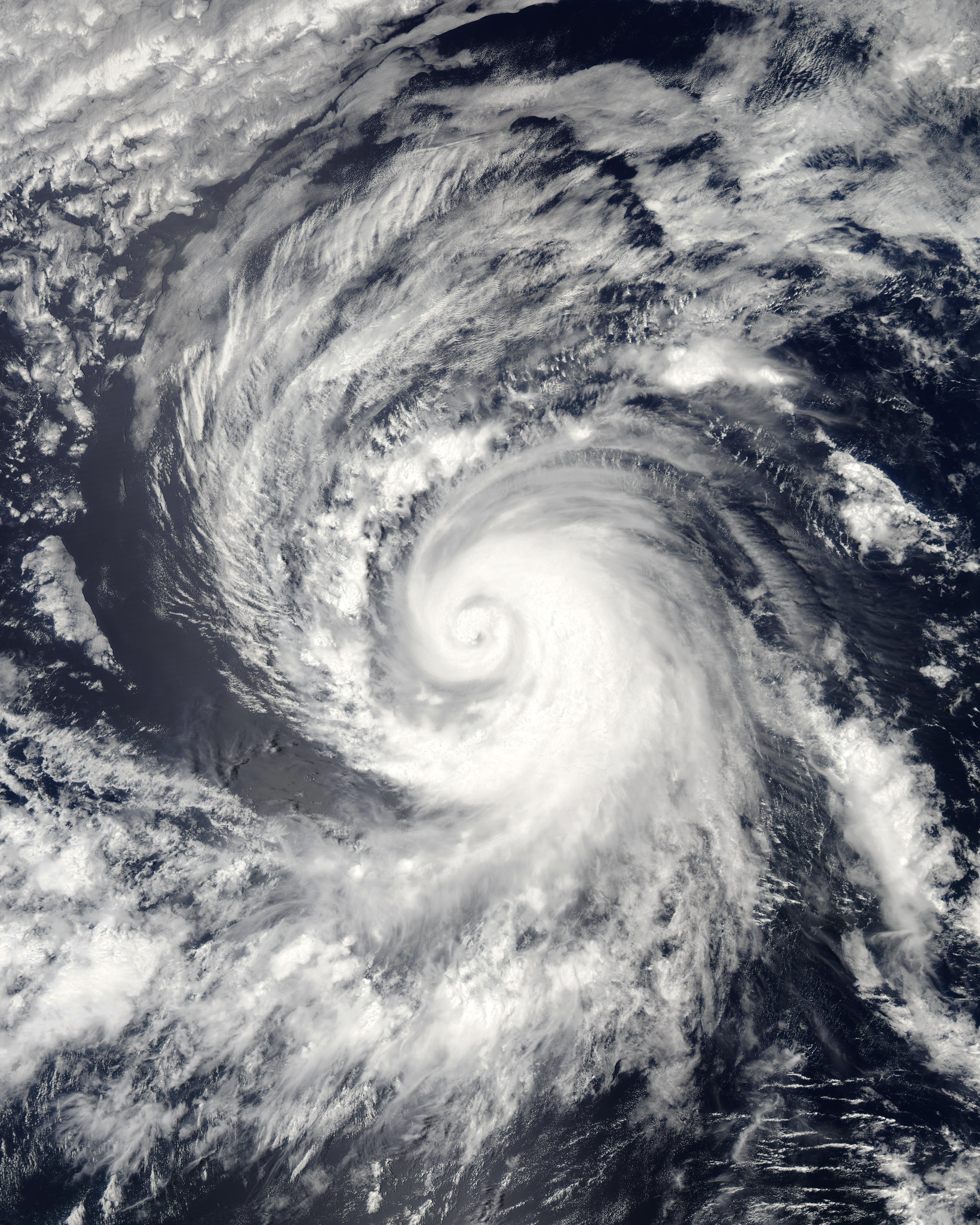
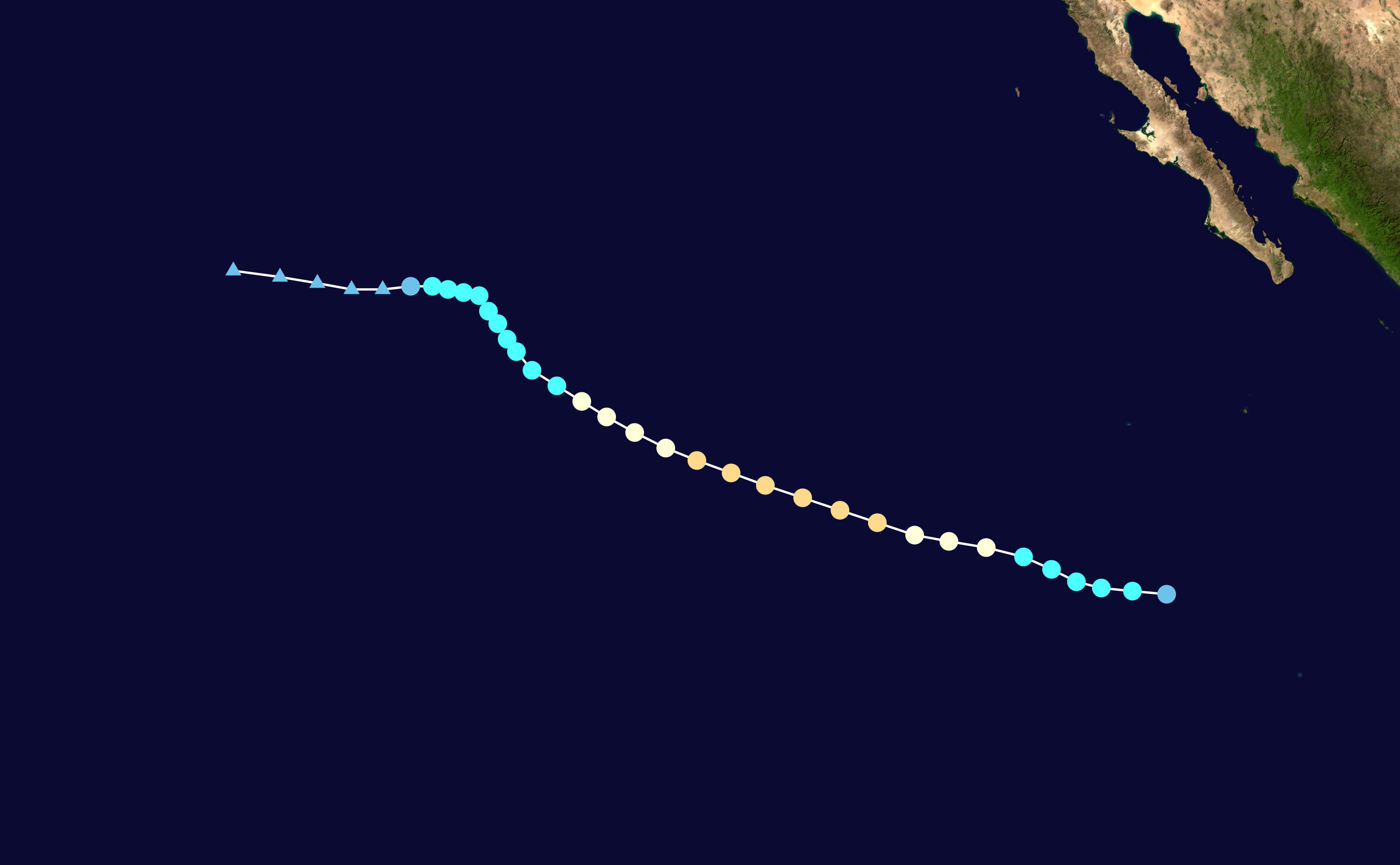
- Duration: August 15 – August 23
- Peak intensity: 110 mph (175 km/h) (1-min); 966 mbar (hPa)

A tropical wave exited Africa on July 31, and after no development in the Atlantic, it crossed Central America into the northeastern Pacific Ocean on August 10. Convection gradually increased, and a broad low-pressure area developed about 375 miles (604 km) south of Acapulco, Mexico on August 13. The system continued to become organized, and it developed into a tropical depression around 1800 UTC on August 15 about 650 mi (1,050 km) south-southwest of the southern tip of Baja California. It moved west-northwestward, located south of a ridge that extended westward from northern Mexico westward into the Pacific. The depression quickly intensified into Tropical Storm Hector early on August 16. Hector was able to steadily strengthen, reaching hurricane status at 0600 UTC on August 17. It is estimated that Hector reached its peak intensity of 110 mph (175 km/h) at 0600 UTC on August 18, while centered about 1,035 mi (1,666 km) southwest of the southern tip of Baja California.

Hector remained a Category 2 hurricane for about 24 hours. Shortly thereafter, it encountered cooler waters and westerly shear, and Hector steadily weakened until becoming a tropical storm by August 20. Shortly thereafter, the storm reached a weakness in the subtropical ridge, which caused it to move slowly to the northwest. By August 21, deep convection was confined to the northeast portion of the circulation. The shear was not strong enough to completely weaken the tropical cyclone and Hector remained a tropical storm with 50 mph (80 km/h) winds for about 24 hours. After the remaining shower and thunderstorm activity dissipated on August 22, the cyclone turned westward in response to the low-level easterly wind flow. Hector weakened to a tropical depression at 0000 UTC on August 23, and to a remnant low six hours later. The remnant circulation of Hector dissipated on August 24 about 750 mi (1,210 km) east of the Hawaiian Islands.

=== Hurricane Ioke ===
- Category 5 hurricane (SSHWS)
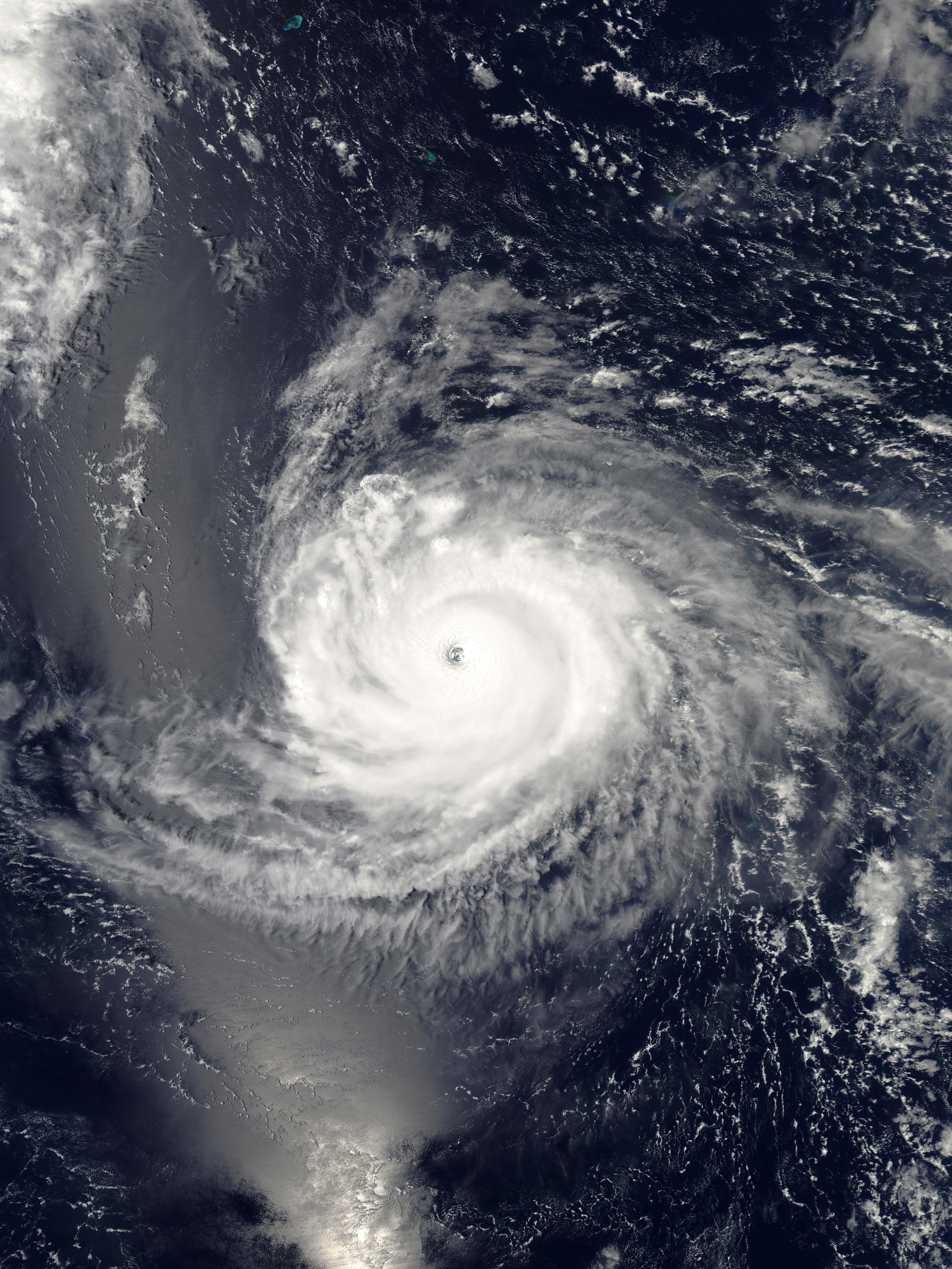
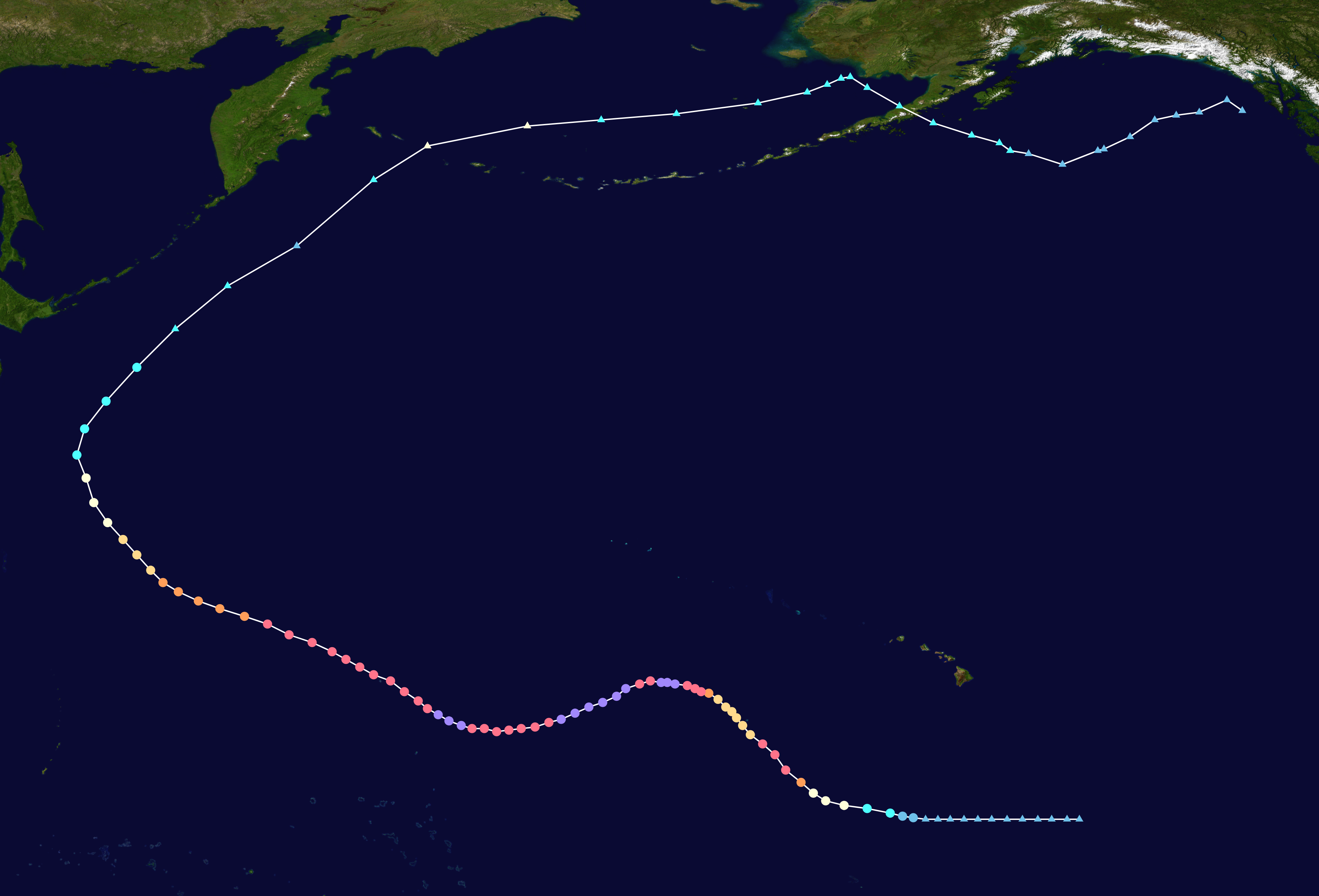
- Duration: August 20 – August 27 (Exited basin)
- Peak intensity: 160 mph (260 km/h) (1-min); 915 mbar (hPa)

The cyclone developed from the Intertropical Convergence Zone on August 20 far to the south of Hawaii. Encountering warm waters, little wind shear, and well-defined outflow, Ioke intensified from a tropical depression to Category 4 status within 48 hours. Late on August 22 it rapidly weakened to Category 2 status before crossing over Johnston Atoll. Two days later favorable conditions again allowed for rapid strengthening, and Ioke attained Category 5 status on August 25 before crossing the International Date Line. At the time, its barometric pressure was estimated at 915 mbar, thus becoming the strongest hurricane on record in the Central Pacific. As it continued westward its intensity fluctuated, and on August 31 it passed near Wake Island with winds of 155 mph (249 km/h). Ioke gradually weakened as it turned northwestward and northward, and by September 6 it had transitioned into an extratropical cyclone. By then, the cyclone had lasted 19 days, reaching the equivalent of Category 5 status on the Saffir–Simpson hurricane scale three times. The remnants of Ioke accelerated northeastward and ultimately crossed into Alaska.

Ioke did not affect any permanently populated areas in the Central Pacific or Western Pacific basins as a hurricane or a typhoon. A crew of 12 people stayed in a hurricane-proof bunker on Johnston Atoll during the hurricane's passage; the crew estimated winds reached over 100 mph (160 km/h), which damaged trees on the island but did not impact the island's bird population. The hurricane left moderate damage on Wake Island totaling $88 million (2006 USD), which resulted from blown off roofs and damaged buildings, although the infrastructure of the island was left intact. All military personnel were evacuated from the island, the first full-scale evacuation of the island since Typhoon Sarah in 1967. Later, the extratropical remnants of Ioke produced a severe storm surge along the Alaskan coastline, causing beach erosion.

=== Hurricane Ileana ===
- Category 3 hurricane (SSHWS)
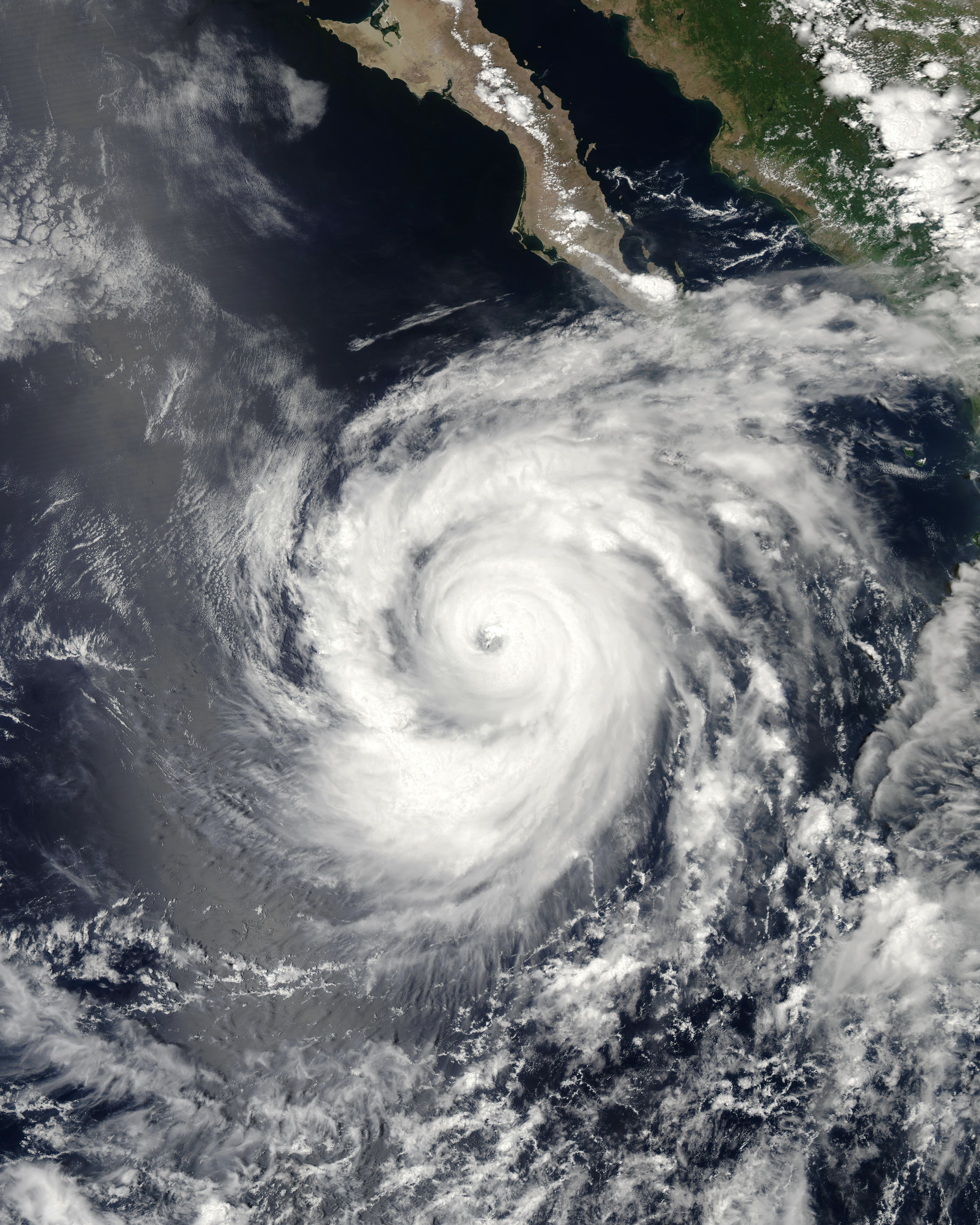
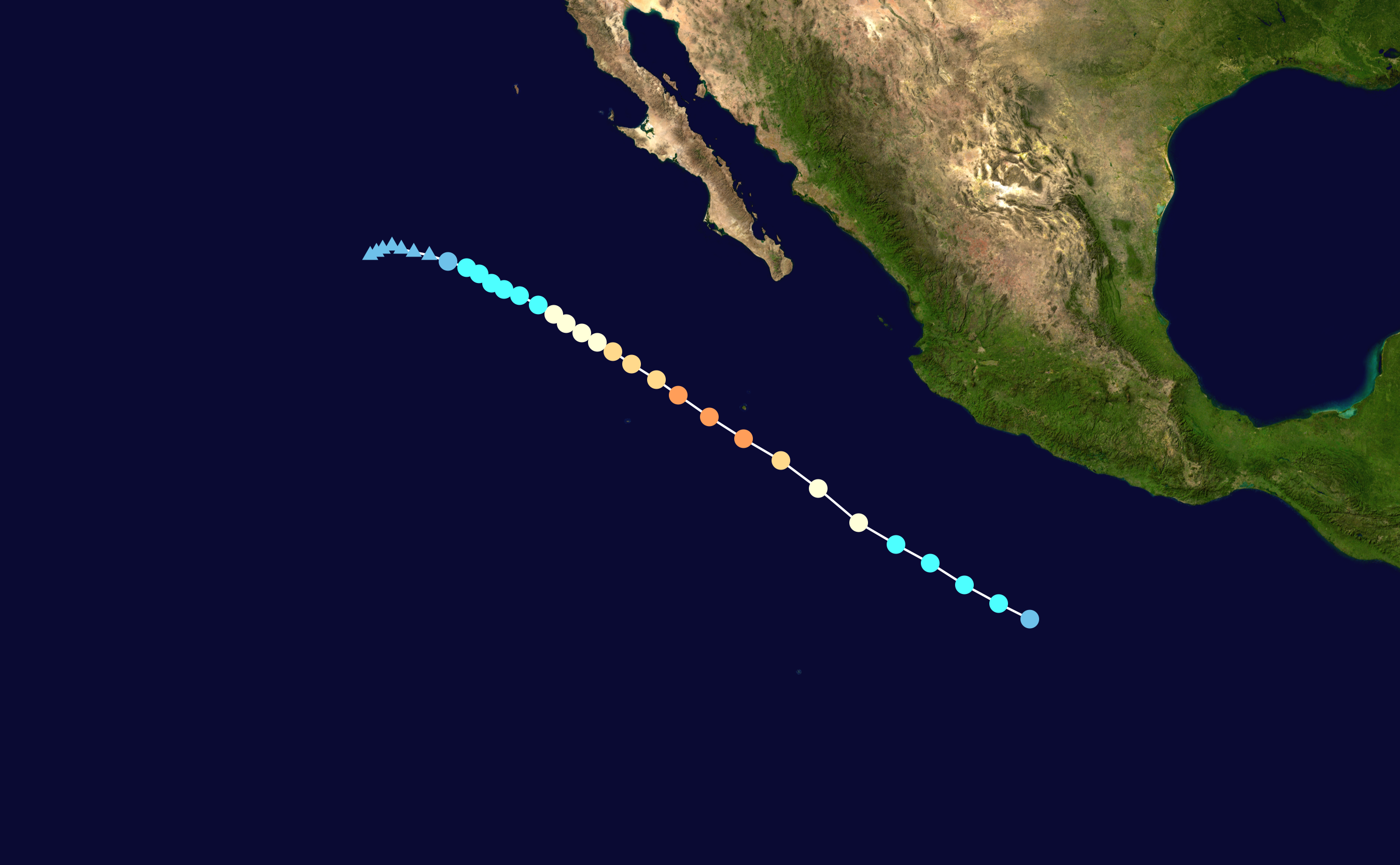
- Duration: August 21 – August 27
- Peak intensity: 120 mph (195 km/h) (1-min); 955 mbar (hPa)

A tropical wave exited the west coast of Africa on August 8, and entered the eastern Pacific on August 16. Three days later, a weak low-pressure area formed, and thunderstorms consolidated near that feature. On August 21, the NHC designated the system Tropical Depression Ten-E about 350 mi (565 km) south-southwest of Acapulco, Mexico. A ridge over Mexico steered the system to the northwest through an area of warm waters and low wind shear. With favorable conditions, the depression quickly intensified into Tropical Storm Ileana. An eye formed in the center of the convection, and Ileana attained hurricane status late on August 22. On August 23, about 48 hours after forming, Ileana reached major hurricane status and a peak intensity of 120 mph (195 km/h), with a minimum pressure of 955 mbar (28.2 inHg). At that time, the storm was about 60 mi (95 km) southeast of the unpopulated Socorro Island. During the storm's passage nearby, a station on the island recorded sustained winds of 59 mph (95 km/h), with gusts to 77 mph (124 km/h).

As Ileana was heading north along the Mexican coastline, slight rainfall was recorded along the coast, which caused some flooding in Nayarit, Jalisco, Colima, Michoacán, and Baja California Sur. High surf killed a man near Cabo San Lucas, despite warnings not to swim in the ocean. Despite forecasts of further intensification to Category 4 status, Ileana began weakening due to cooler waters. The thunderstorms waned, and the storm slowed its forward motion. On August 26, Ileana weakened to tropical storm status as convection decreased markedly. The next day, the storm deteriorated to tropical depression status, and later a remnant low after being devoid of thunderstorms. The low continued slowly westward, dissipating on August 29 about 830 mi (1,335 km) west-northwest of Cabo San Lucas.

=== Hurricane John ===
- Category 4 hurricane (SSHWS)
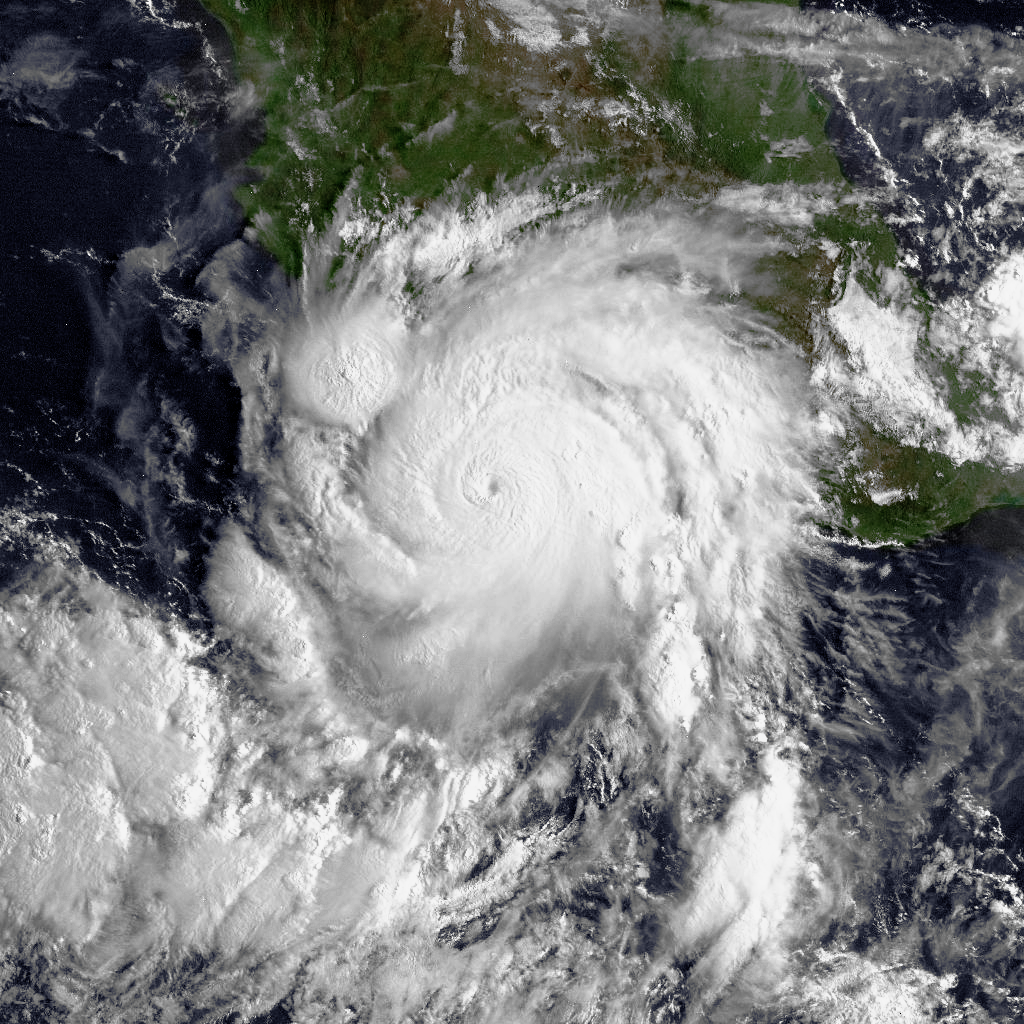
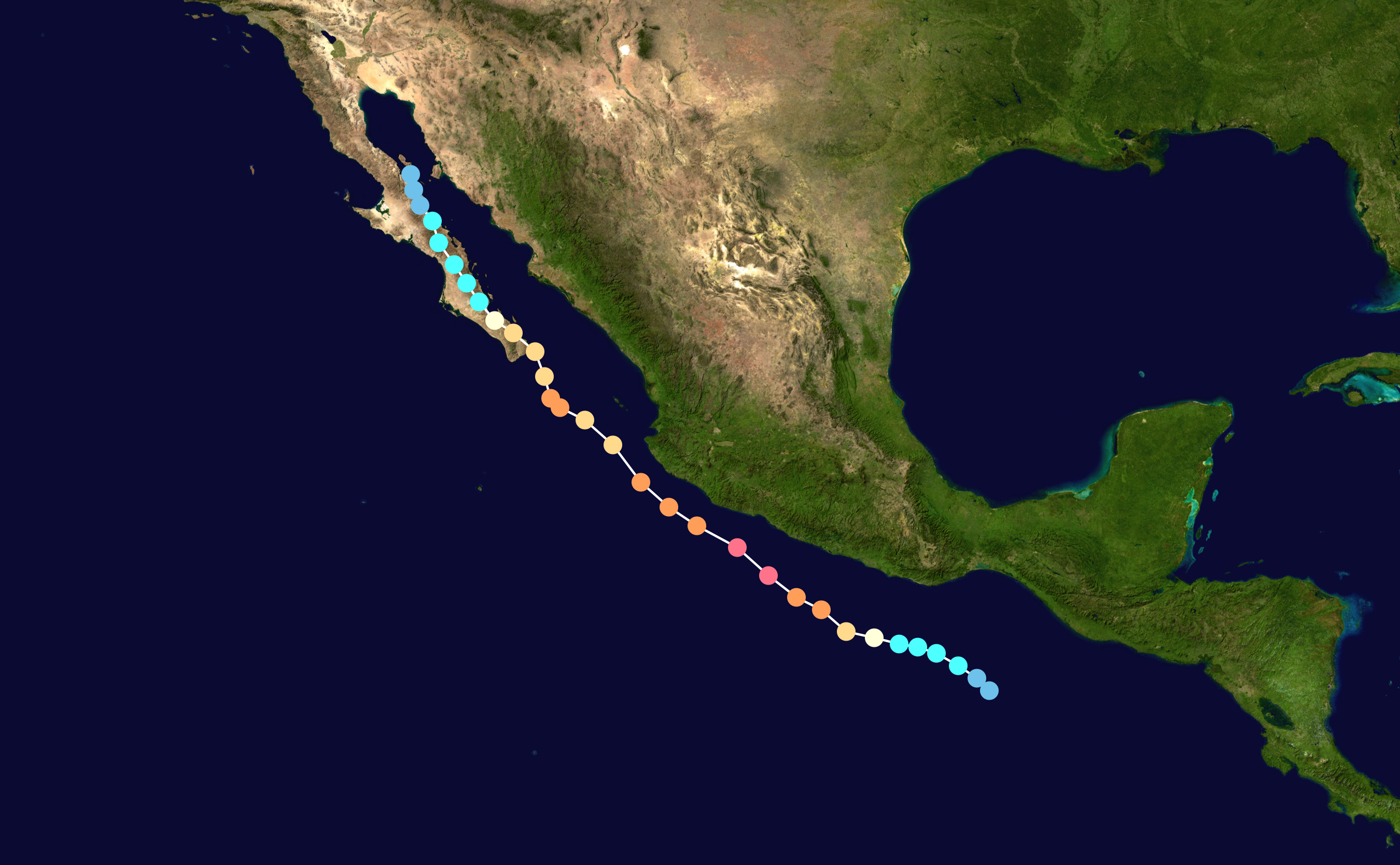
- Duration: August 28 – September 4
- Peak intensity: 130 mph (215 km/h) (1-min); 948 mbar (hPa)

On August 28, a persistent area of low pressure southwest of Acapulco, Mexico developed into a tropical depression. Later that day it strengthened into a tropical storm, and it reached hurricane strength 24 hours later on August 29. John underwent rapid intensification and reached Category 3 intensity later that day and Category 4 on August 30. Hours later, the hurricane underwent another eyewall replacement cycle, and subsequently weakened to Category 3 status as it paralleled the Mexican coastline a short distance offshore. Potentially due to its eyewall replacement cycle or its interaction with land, John weakened to a 105 mph hurricane by late on August 31, but restrengthened to a major hurricane shortly after. It made landfall near the southern tip of the Baja California peninsula as a Category 2 hurricane on September 1. John continued northwestward along the eastern Baja California peninsula, weakening to tropical depression status by September 3 and dissipating on September 4 in the Gulf of California.

Along the southwestern coast of Mexico, John produced heavy surf, strong winds, and heavy rainfall, which flooded roads, caused mudslides, and downed trees. Along the Baja California Peninsula, the hurricane dropped heavy rainfall, with a 24-hour peak of 10.8 inches (270 mm) in Los Planes. The heavy rainfall caused flooding, closed roads, and caused a dam to overflow. The winds and rainfall destroyed thousands of flimsy houses across the region. Across Mexico, five people were killed, and damage amounted to $663 million (2006 MXN, $60.8 million 2006 USD). Moisture from the remnants of John produced flooding across Texas, which closed a 1/2 mile (800 m) portion of Interstate 10 in El Paso. In southern New Mexico, the rainfall caused widespread street flooding and some minor damage. Tropical moisture from the storm also produced rainfall in Arizona and southern California, where eight separate mudslides occurred, trapping 19 vehicles but causing no injuries.

=== Hurricane Kristy ===
- Category 1 hurricane (SSHWS)
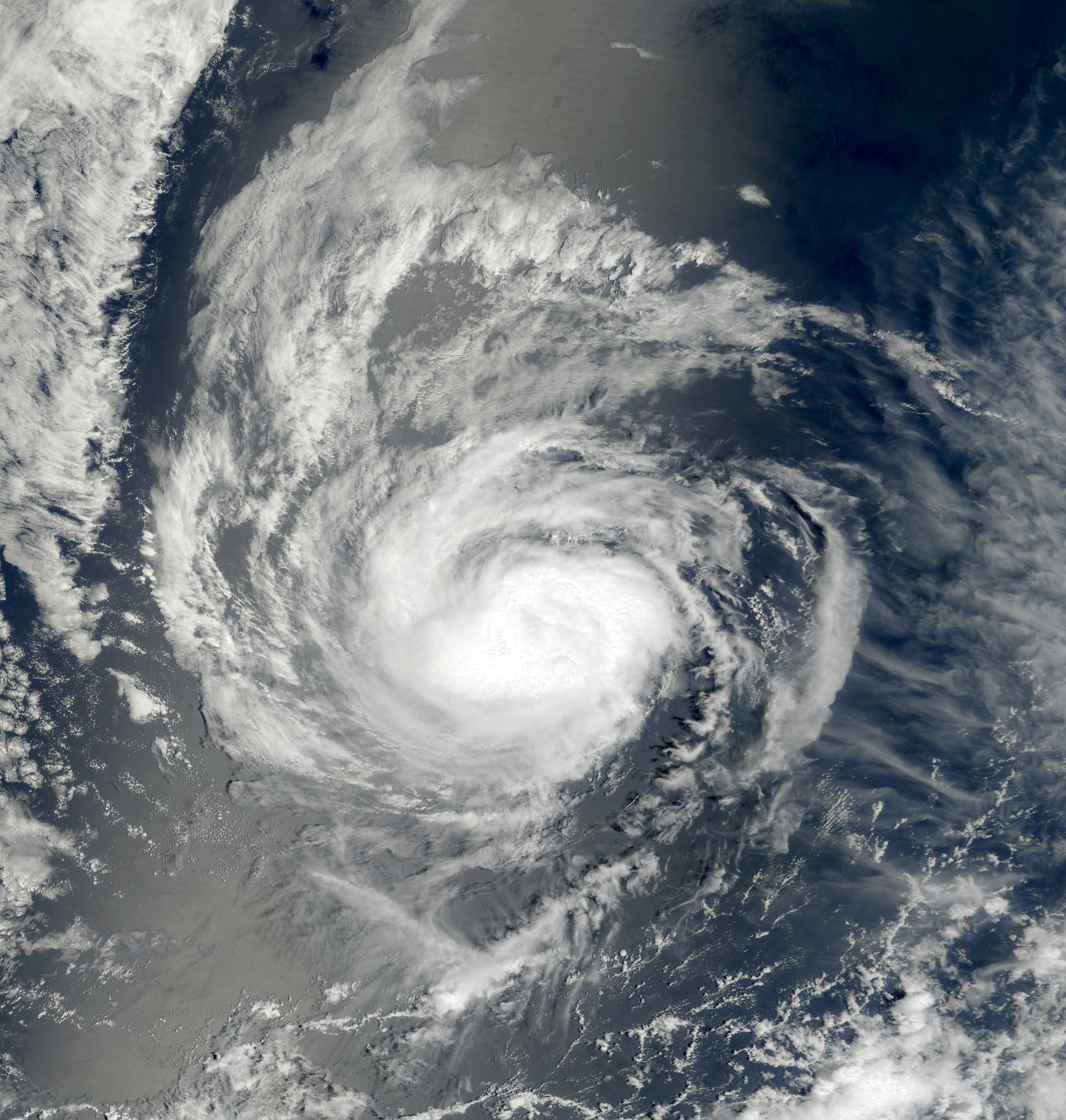
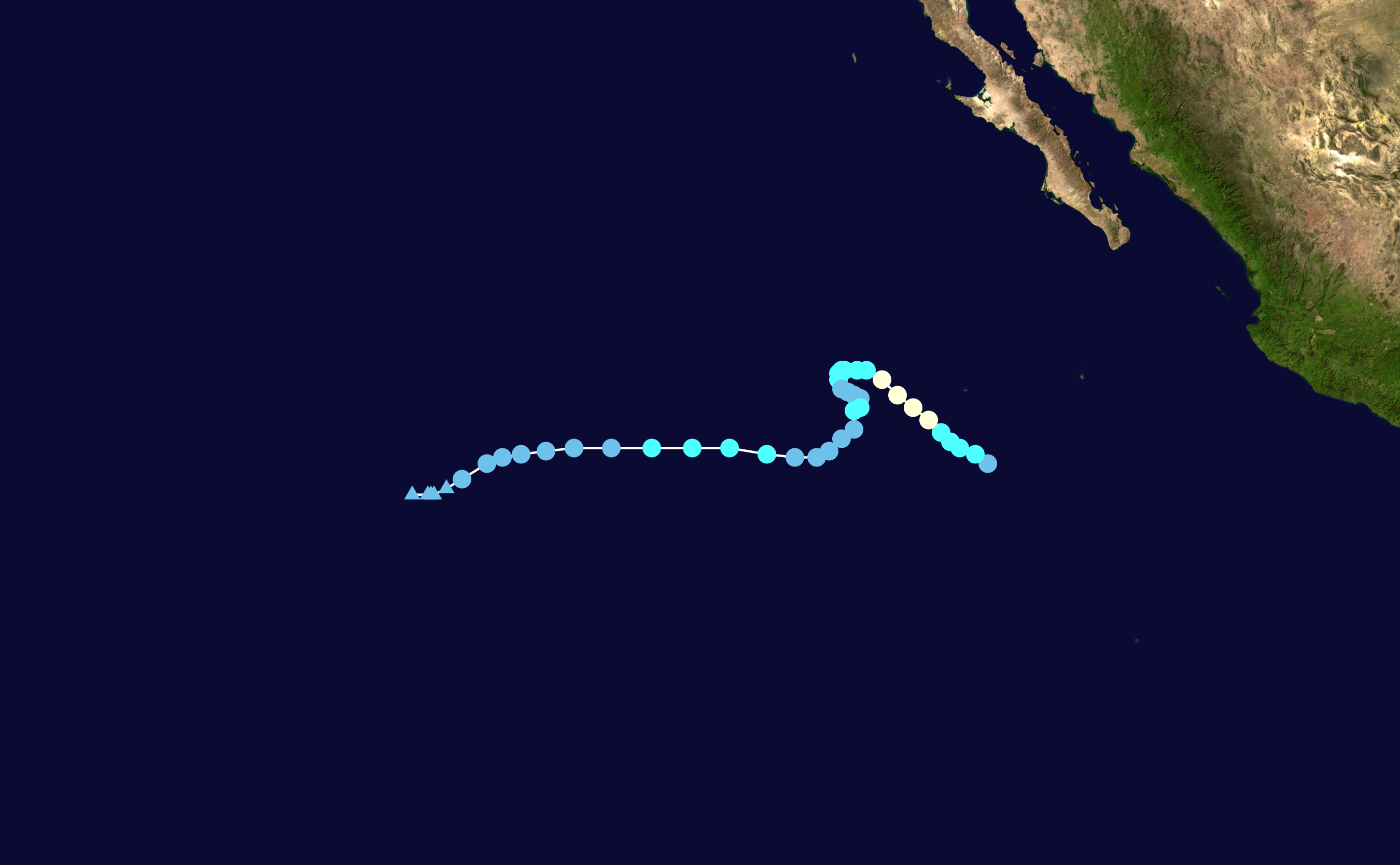
- Duration: August 30 – September 8
- Peak intensity: 80 mph (130 km/h) (1-min); 985 mbar (hPa)

A tropical wave exited western Africa on August 13, which moved across the Atlantic over the next nine days before entering the eastern Pacific. After associated convection became better organized, the system developed into Tropical Depression Twelve-E on August 30 about 600 mi (965 km) southwest of the Baja California peninsula. With light wind shear and warm waters, the depression quickly strengthened into Tropical Storm Kristy as thunderstorms increased. The small system tracked slowly northwestward at first due to a ridge to its north. An eye soon developed, signaling that Kristy intensified into a hurricane early on August 31, about 30 hours after forming. Later that day, the hurricane attained peak winds of 80 mph (130 km/h). Soon after, wind shear increased due to the outflow of powerful Hurricane John to its east, and Kristy moved into an area of cooler waters and drier air. Hurricane forecast models anticipated a Fujiwhara effect, or an orbiting of two tropical cyclones, which would eventually result in Kristy being absorbed by Hurricane John.

On September 1, Kristy weakened to tropical storm status, by which time the ridge to its north forced the storm southeastward. On September 2, the circulation became exposed from the convection, and Kristy fell to tropical depression status. Thunderstorms reformed and persisted over the center on the next day. Kristy re-attained tropical storm status on September 4, although it soon fell back to tropical depression status. Another burst of thunderstorms warranted Kristy being upgraded to tropical storm status again on September 5; by that time, the wind shear decreased and the track moved over warmer waters. Kristy turned back to the west, falling again to tropical depression status on September 6, after thunderstorms decreased due to dry air. Two days later, it degenerated into a remnant low, which dissipated a day later. The remnant disturbance continued westward, and initially Kristy was believed to have developed into Tropical Depression Two-C in the central Pacific Ocean; however, post-season analysis concluded the systems were separate.

=== Hurricane Lane ===
- Category 3 hurricane (SSHWS)
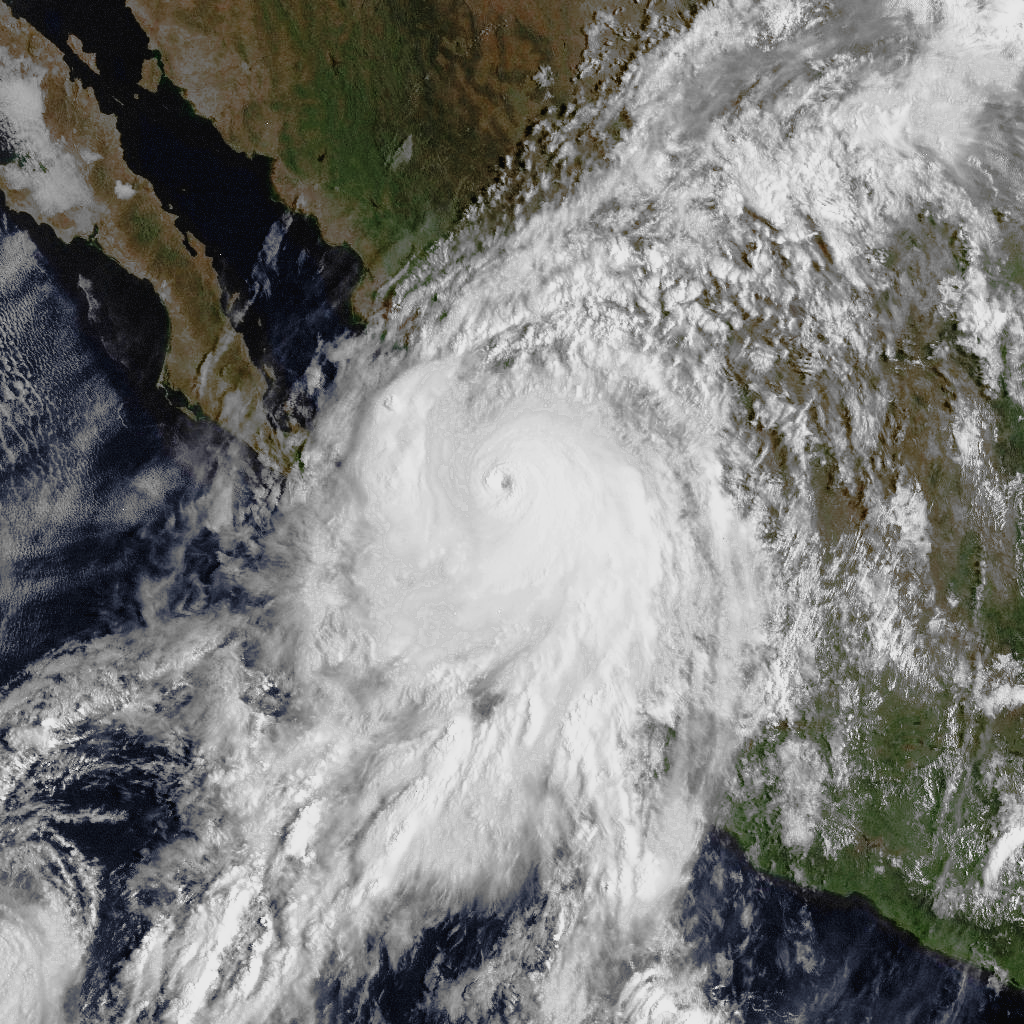
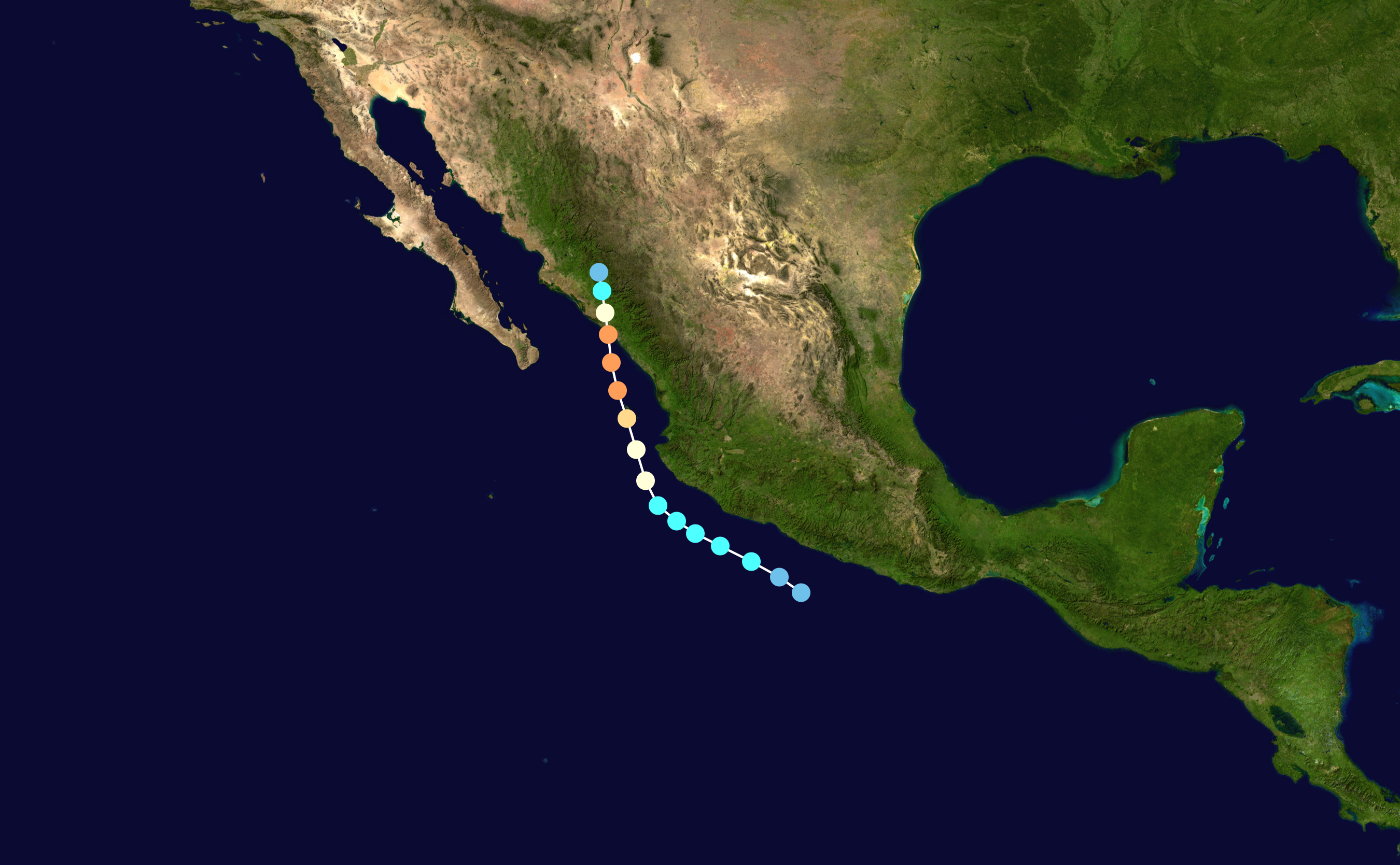
- Duration: September 13 – September 17
- Peak intensity: 125 mph (205 km/h) (1-min); 952 mbar (hPa)

On September 13, a tropical disturbance located about 125 miles (201 km) west-southwest of Acapulco, Mexico, gradually became better organized and was designated the thirteenth tropical depression of the 2006 season. The depression intensified in a favorable environment, and was upgraded to Tropical Storm Lane later that night. As it moved parallel to the Mexican coast it continued to strengthen and became a hurricane on September 15, and a major hurricane early the next day. Hurricane Lane reached peak winds of 125 mph (200 km/h) before it made landfall on the coast of Sinaloa on September 16. It quickly weakened over land and dissipated on September 17.

Tropical Storm Lane produced heavy rainfall and high seas along the west coast of Mexico, including Acapulco where flood waters reached 16 inches (41 cm) in depth. The Acapulco airport also experienced flooding, though service was not interrupted. Throughout Mexico, the hurricane caused four deaths and $2.2 billion (2006 MXN, $203 million 2006 USD) in damage, half of which in Sinaloa where heavy crop damage was reported. An estimated 4,320 homes were affected by the hurricane, and 19,200 miles (30,900 km) of roads and highways were damaged to some degree, including some destroyed bridges.

=== Tropical Storm Miriam ===
- Tropical storm (SSHWS)
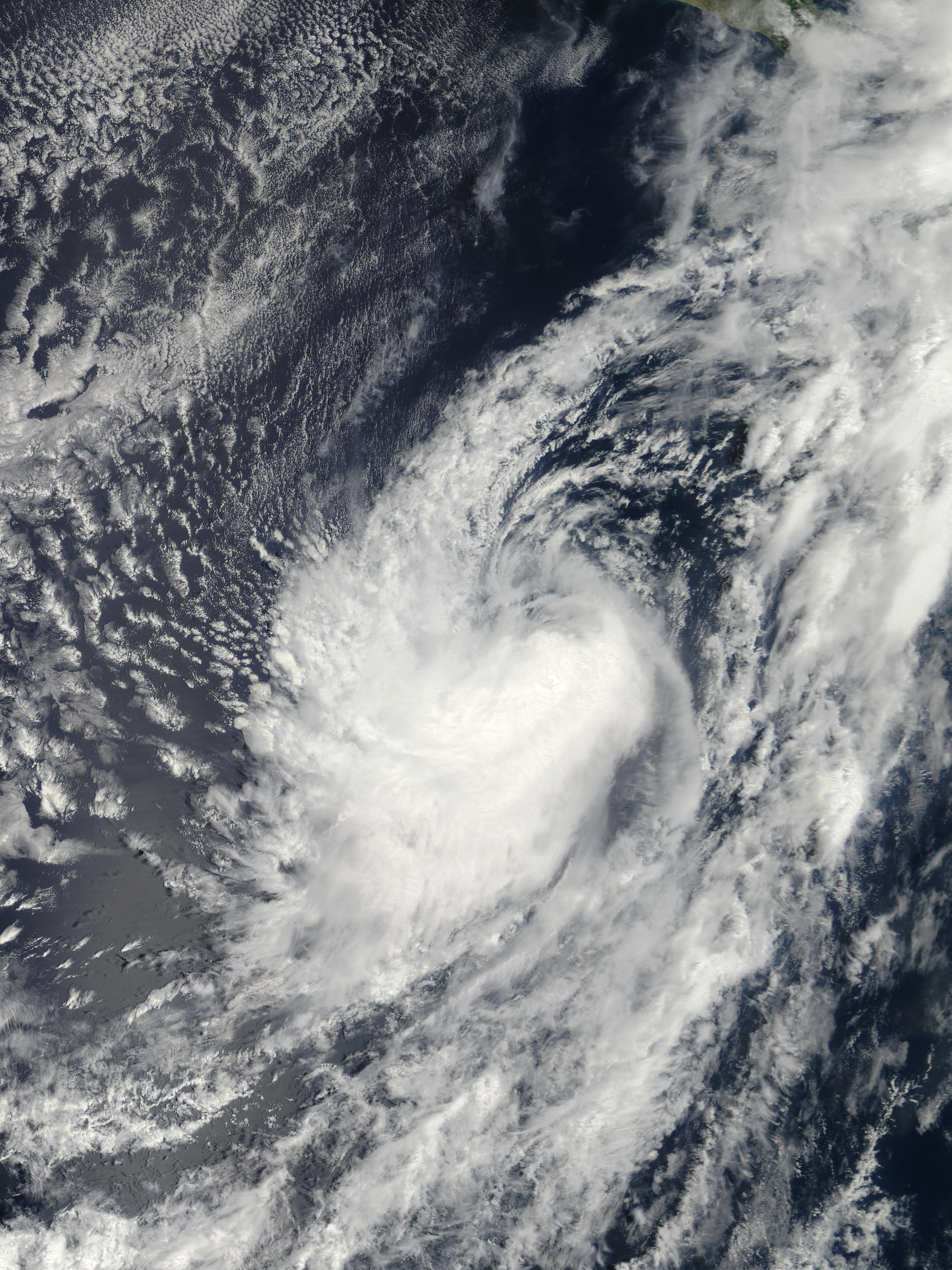
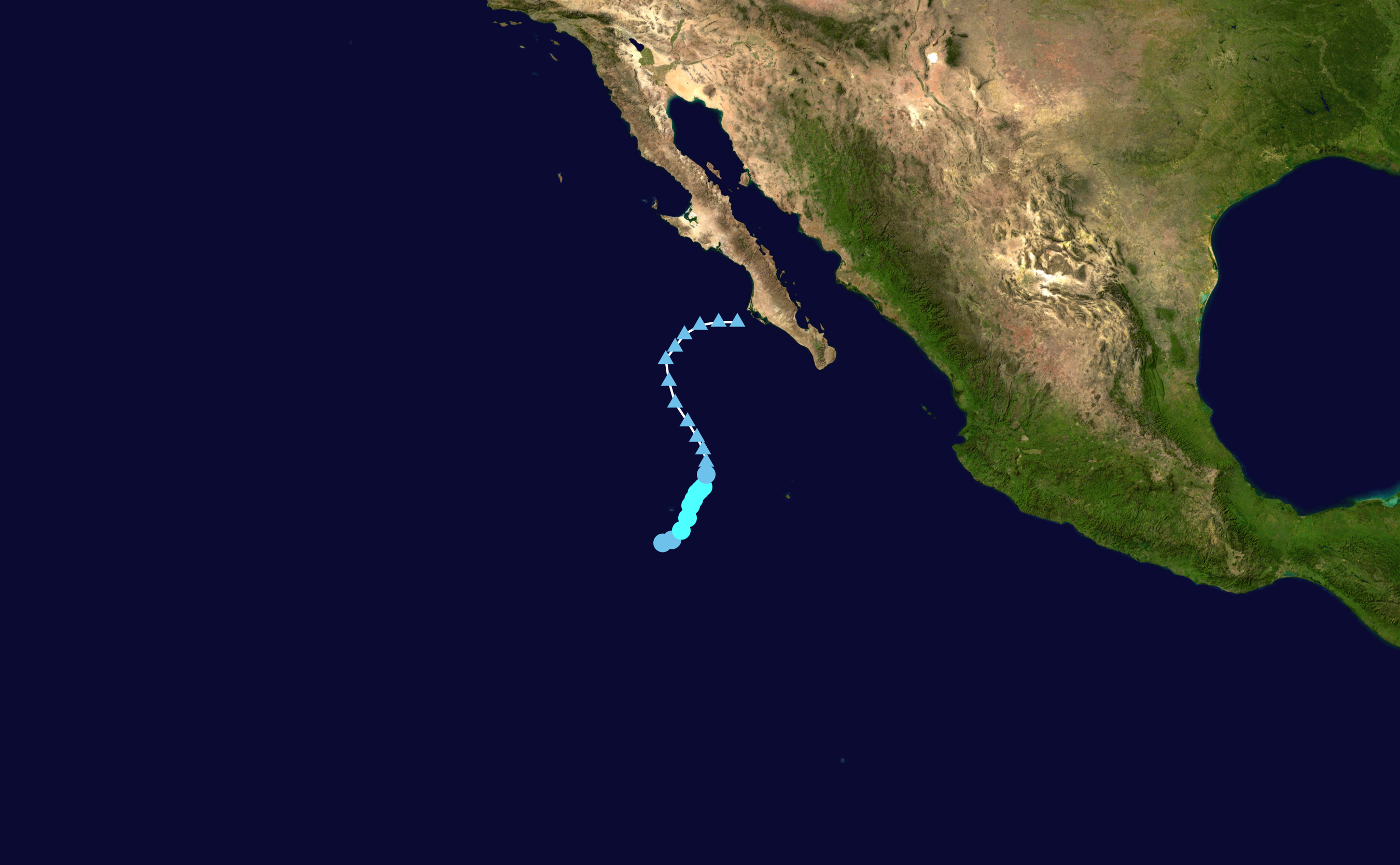
- Duration: September 16 – September 18
- Peak intensity: 45 mph (75 km/h) (1-min); 999 mbar (hPa)

A disturbance associated with a northerly extension of the Intertropical Convergence Zone and a tropical wave developed a closed circulation on September 15. It moved northeastward due to the influence from nearby Hurricane Lane, and organized enough to be declared Tropical Depression Fourteen-E on September 16 while located about 500 miles southwest of Cabo San Lucas, Mexico. It quickly strengthened, and organized into Tropical Storm Miriam later that day. After reaching a peak intensity of 45 mph (70 km/h), vertical wind shear and cooler waters rapidly weakened the storm, and the circulation decoupled from the convection on September 17. After turning more towards the north, Miriam weakened to tropical depression status, and on September 18 it degenerated to a remnant low. The remnant circulation turned to the northwest, then to the east, and dissipated on September 21 a short distance west of Baja California. No deaths are damage are associated with Miriam, and only one ship recorded winds of over tropical storm force near the center.

=== Tropical Depression Two-C ===
- Tropical depression (SSHWS)
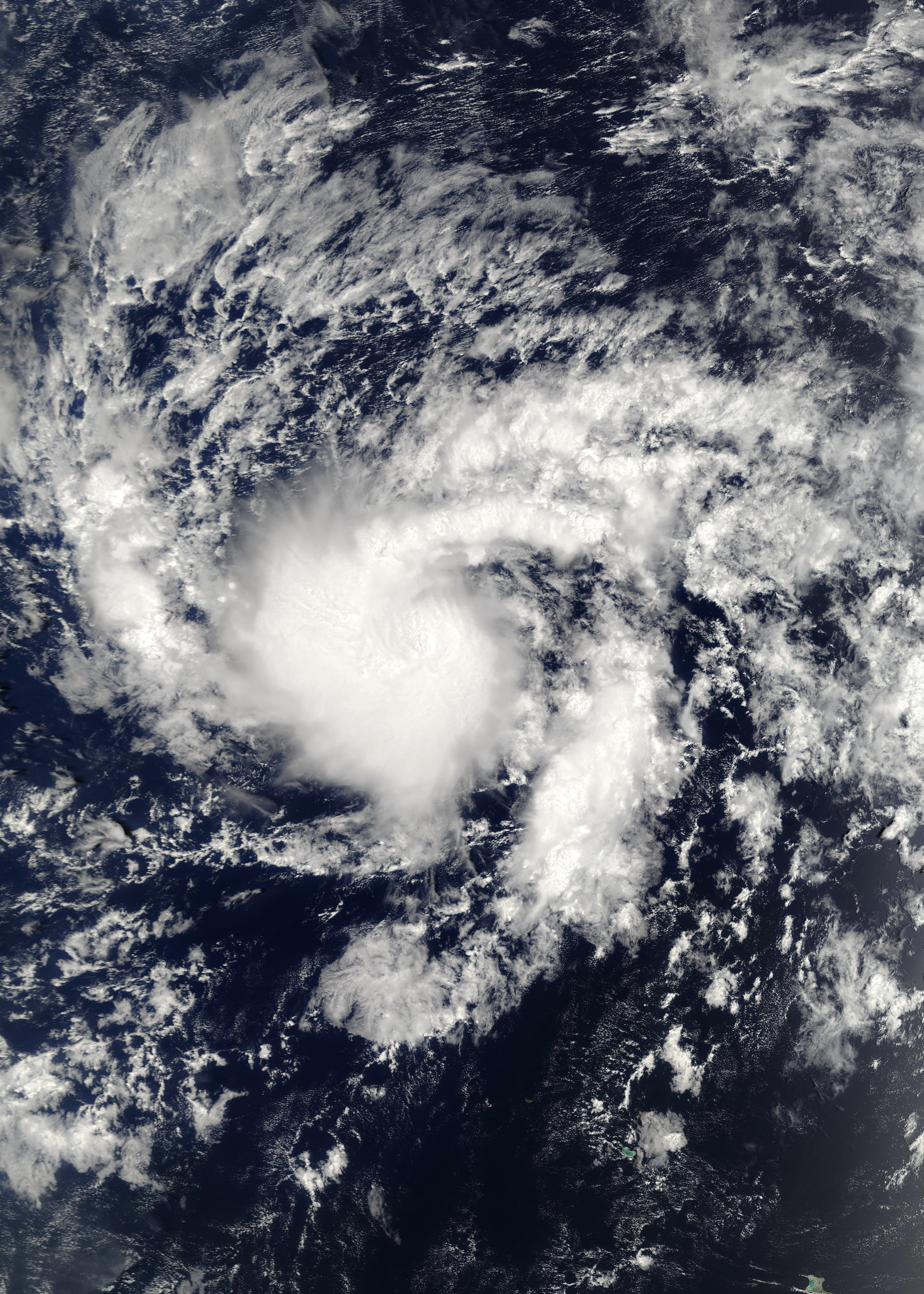
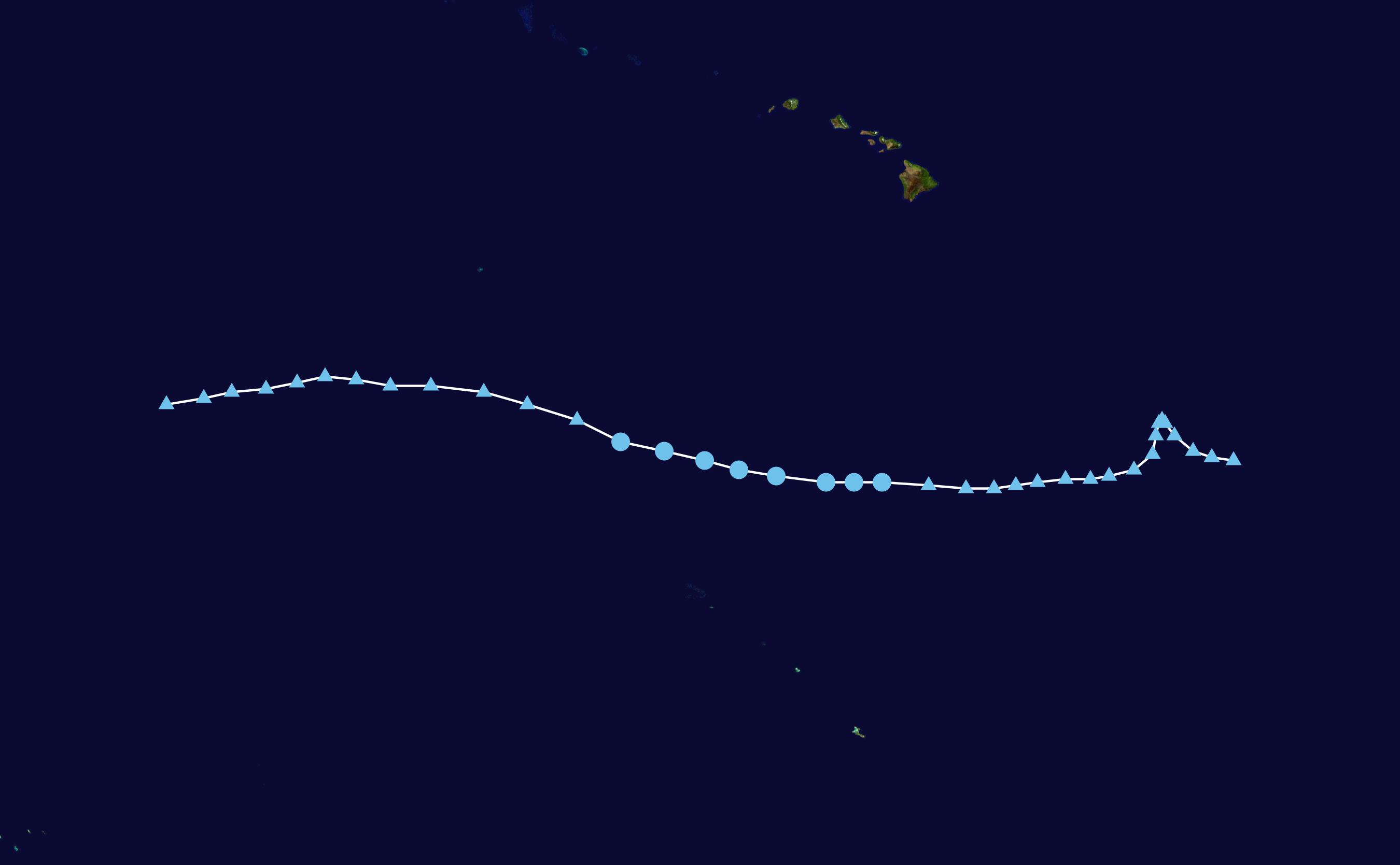
- Duration: September 19 – September 20
- Peak intensity: 35 mph (55 km/h) (1-min); 1007 mbar (hPa)

On September 19, an area of disturbed weather associated with the Intertropical Convergence Zone became sufficiently organized to be designated Tropical Depression Two-C. Initially, it was thought that the depression formed from the remnants of Kristy, although subsequent analysis confirmed they were two separate systems. Initially, the depression was in an area of favorable conditions, with little wind shear and warm waters. As a result, the CPHC predicted significant strengthening to at least hurricane status. Instead, a high-pressure system to its north increased wind shear over the depression, causing the convection to become removed from the center. The depression weakened into a remnant low on September 20, never reaching tropical storm status.

=== Tropical Depression Three-C ===
- Tropical depression (SSHWS)
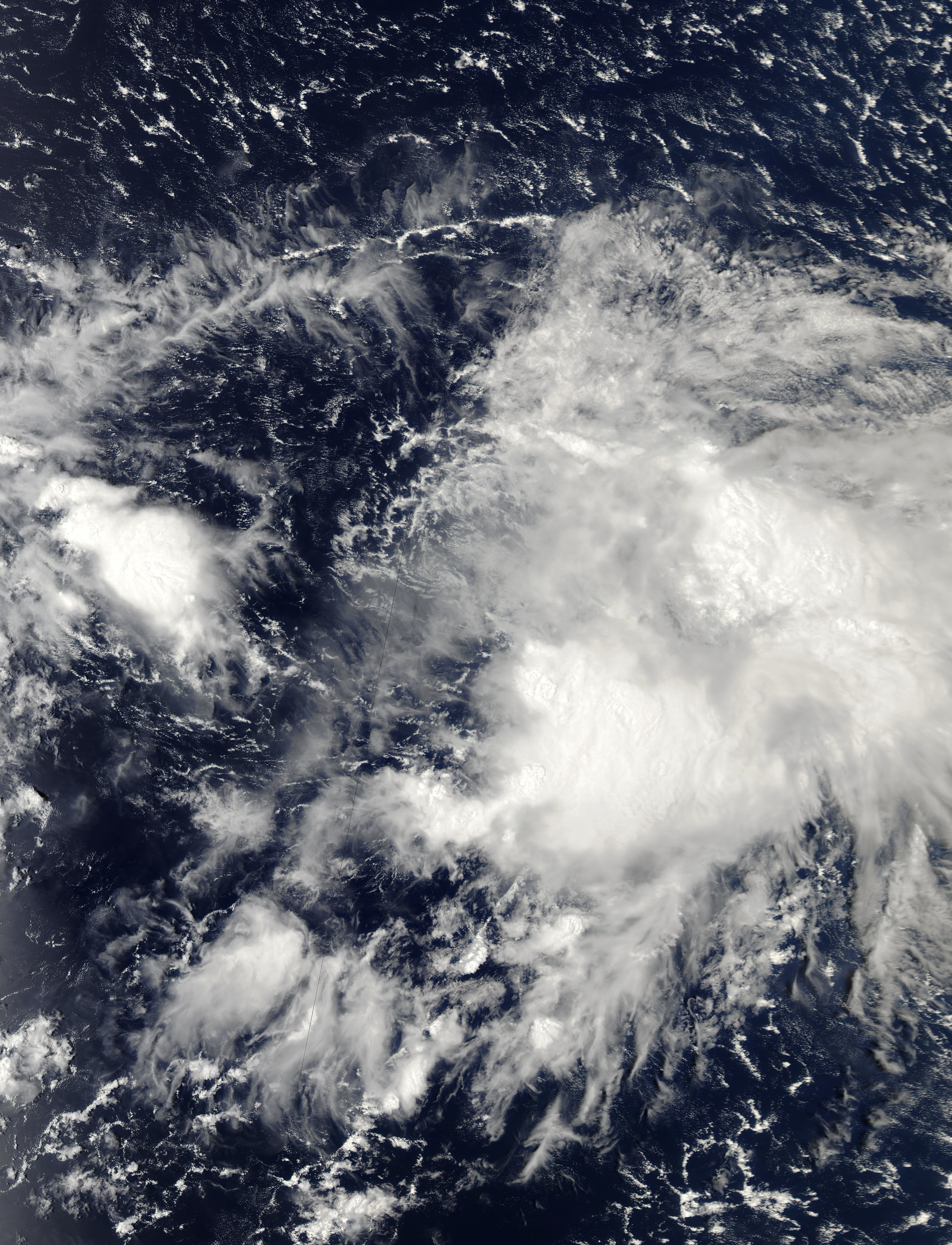
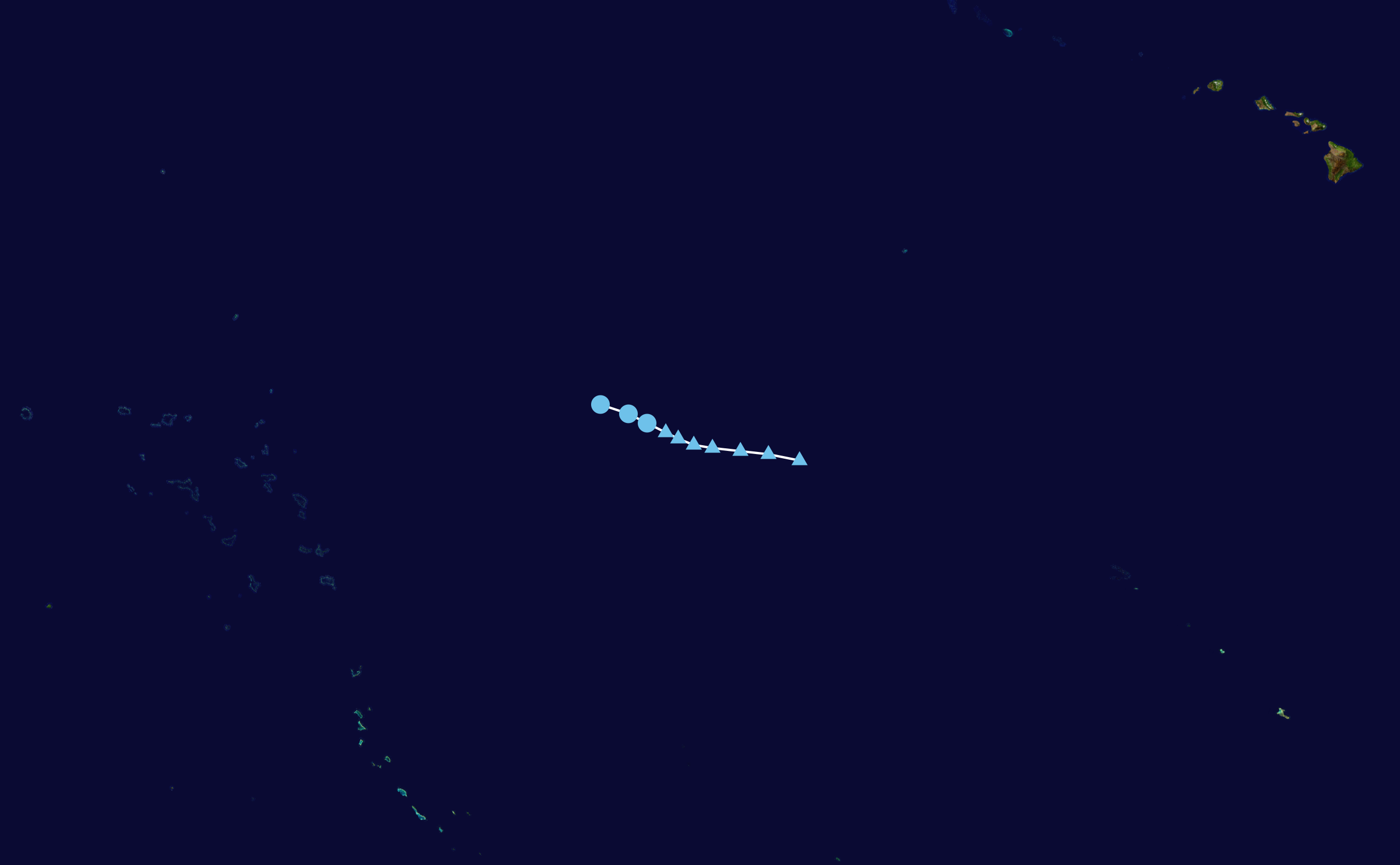
- Duration: September 26 – September 27
- Peak intensity: 35 mph (55 km/h) (1-min); 1005 mbar (hPa)

During September, El Niño conditions became established across the Pacific, which produced an area of warmer waters along the International Date Line. A few days after Tropical Depression Two-C dissipated, another area of disturbed weather formed, and although it was disorganized, it was also persistent. The CPHC initiated advisories on Tropical Depression Three-C on September 26 after a circulation was evident in the system. Strong wind shear prevented any development, and the system dissipated on September 27.

=== Tropical Storm Norman ===
- Tropical storm (SSHWS)
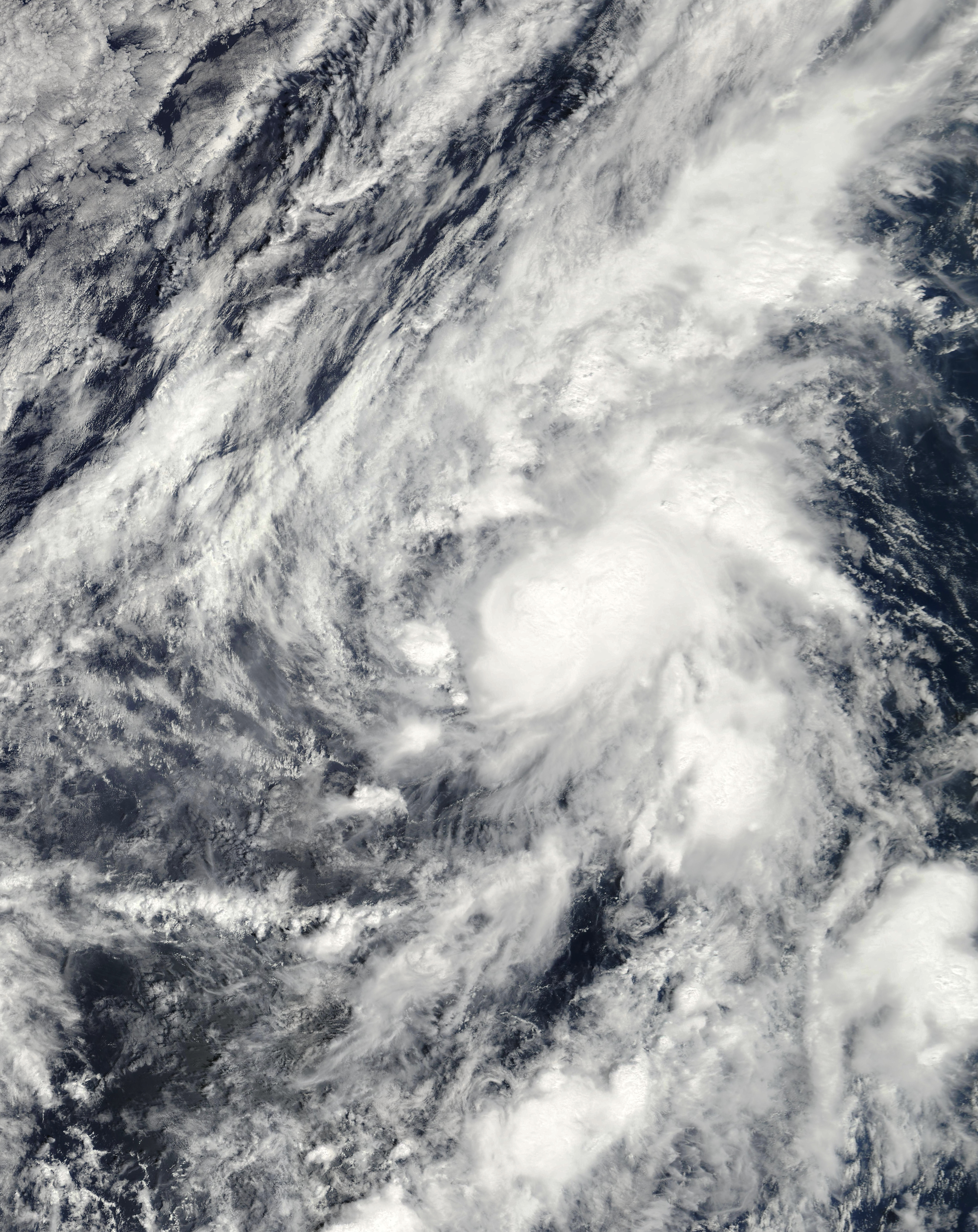
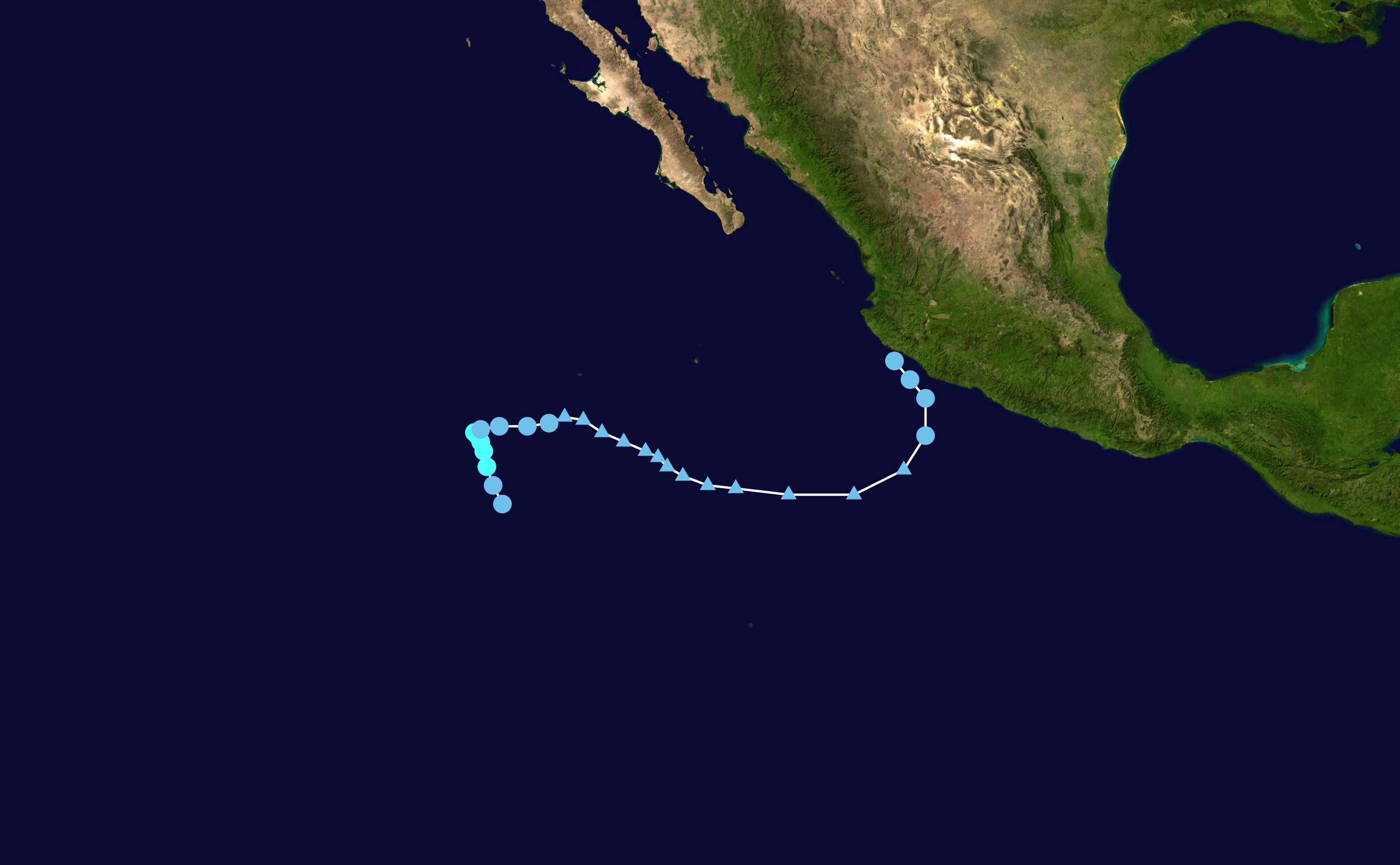
- Duration: October 9 – October 15
- Peak intensity: 50 mph (85 km/h) (1-min); 1000 mbar (hPa)

A tropical wave moved off the coast of Africa on September 21. It moved across the Atlantic Ocean, entering the eastern Pacific on October 1. By October 5, the system produced a large area of convection. The western portion of the system later developed into Tropical Storm Olivia, while the eastern portion developed into Tropical Depression Fifteen-E early on October 9, about 765 mi (1,231 km) southwest of the southern tip of the Baja California Peninsula. The depression moved north-northwestward around the western periphery of a weak ridge. Located over warm water temperatures, the depression intensified into Tropical Storm Norman 12 hours after forming, as its convection organized over the center. Norman attained peak winds of 50 mph (80 km/h) early on October 10. Shortly after peaking in intensity, southwesterly wind shear increased, causing Norman to weaken and lose thunderstorms over the center. At the same time, a trough turned the storm to the east. Early on October 11, Norman degenerated into a remnant low about 530 miles (850 km) southwest of Cabo San Lucas, Mexico. The remnants of Norman interacted with a tropical disturbance off the coast of Mexico, causing convection to reform and organize. Early on October 15, it reformed into a tropical depression, near the coast of southwestern Mexico. The center quickly became less-organized turning northward and northwestward within the larger tropical disturbance. Late on October 15, it is estimated Tropical Depression Norman dissipated 23 miles (37 km) south and offshore of Manzanillo, Colima, although satellite imagery suggested the center may have dissipated inland.

The storm brought heavy rainfall to southwestern Mexico, peaking at 6.35 inches (161 mm) in La Villita, Michoacán. Flooding from four days of rainfall caused officials to close schools in and around Acapulco. The rainfall resulted in downed trees and mudslides. About 150 homes became flooded, resulting in military personnel to assist in evacuating the flooded houses. In total, 20 homes were destroyed, and 20 villages were left without power. A transport vehicle carrying 15 people was swept away by a flooded stream, resulting in one injury; the truck was later rescued by police workers. About 300 hectares (740 acres) of crop fields sustained damage; however, little crop damage was reported, as the storm occurred after harvesting had ended.

=== Tropical Storm Olivia ===
- Tropical storm (SSHWS)
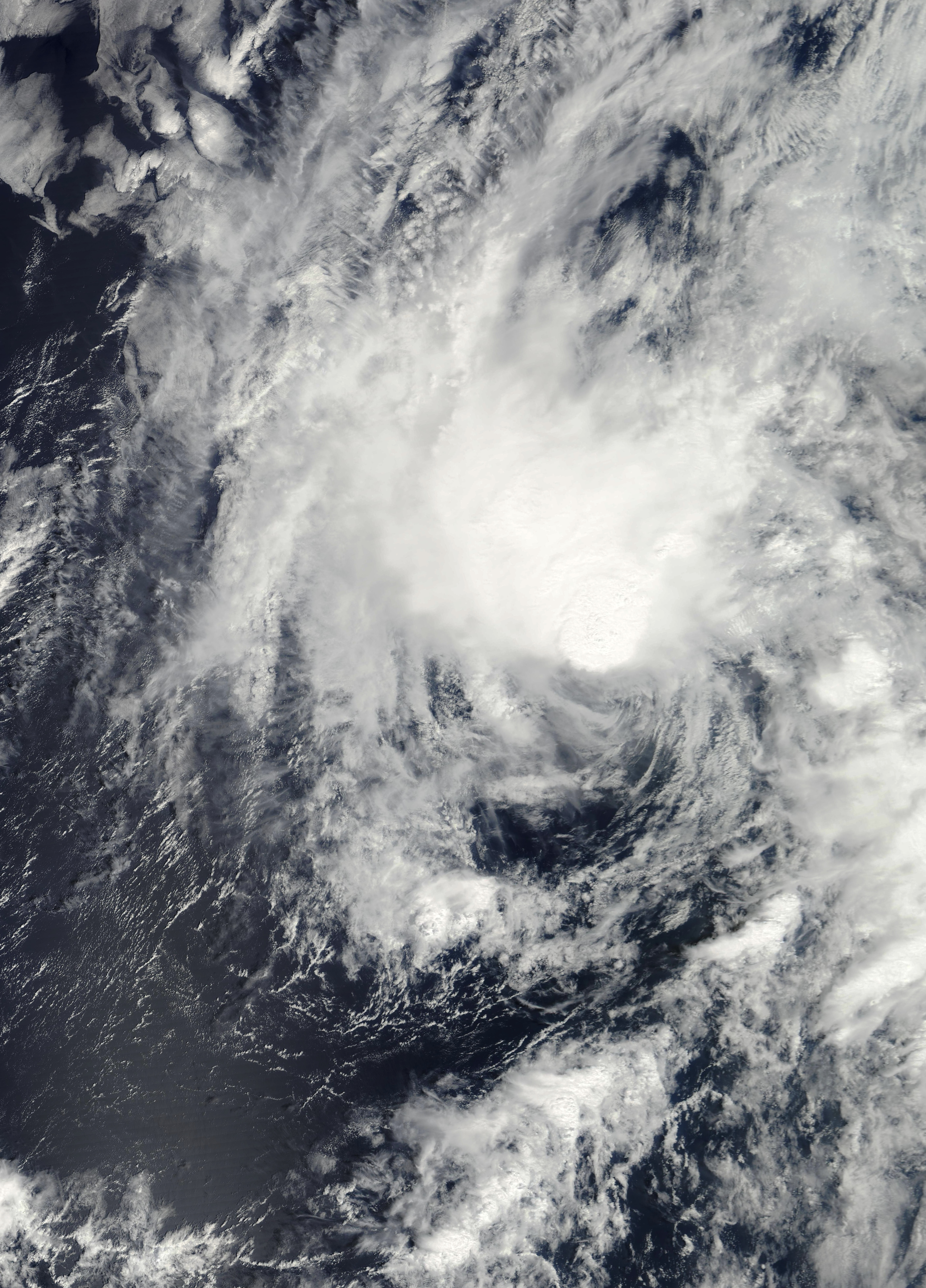
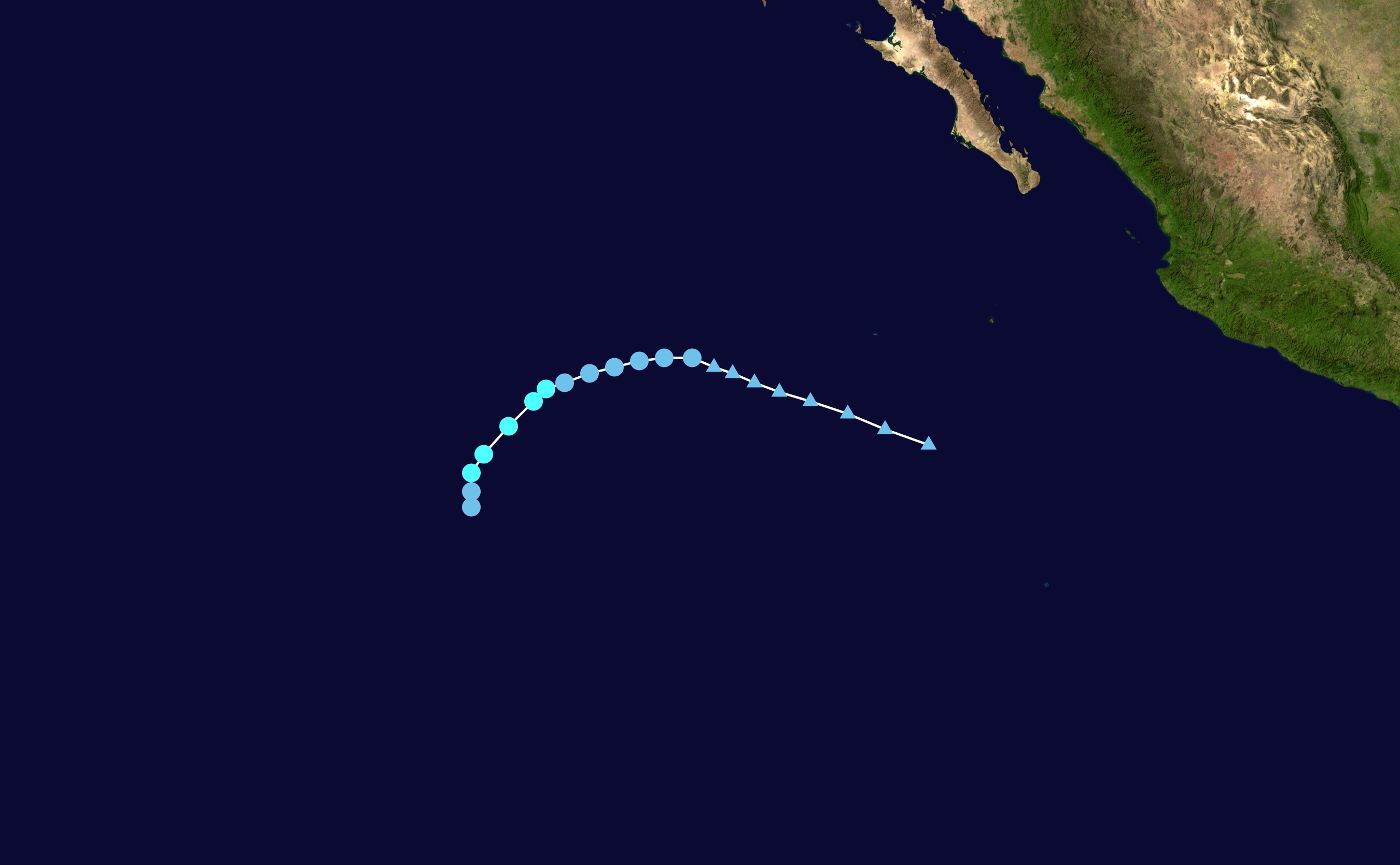
- Duration: October 9 – October 12
- Peak intensity: 45 mph (75 km/h) (1-min); 1000 mbar (hPa)

On September 18, a tropical wave exited Africa and later crossed into the eastern Pacific on September 29 without development. Convection increased in the Pacific along the wave axis, spawning a broad low-pressure area on October 5. Despite the presence of wind shear, it organized enough for the NHC to initiate advisories on Tropical Depression Sixteen-E on October 9 about 1,360 miles (2,190 km) to the west-southwest of the southern tip of Baja California. Influenced by a high-pressure system, the depression drifted northward. Six hours after being upgraded to a tropical storm, Olivia attained peak winds of 45 mph (70 km/h), although the convection was limited to its northern side due to wind shear. On October 11, the convective activity diminished and Olivia weakened to tropical depression status. Olivia deteriorated into a remnant low on October 13. It moved towards the east-southeast, and on October 15 was absorbed into the remnants of Tropical Storm Norman. Olivia never affected land.

=== Tropical Depression Four-C ===
- Tropical depression (SSHWS)
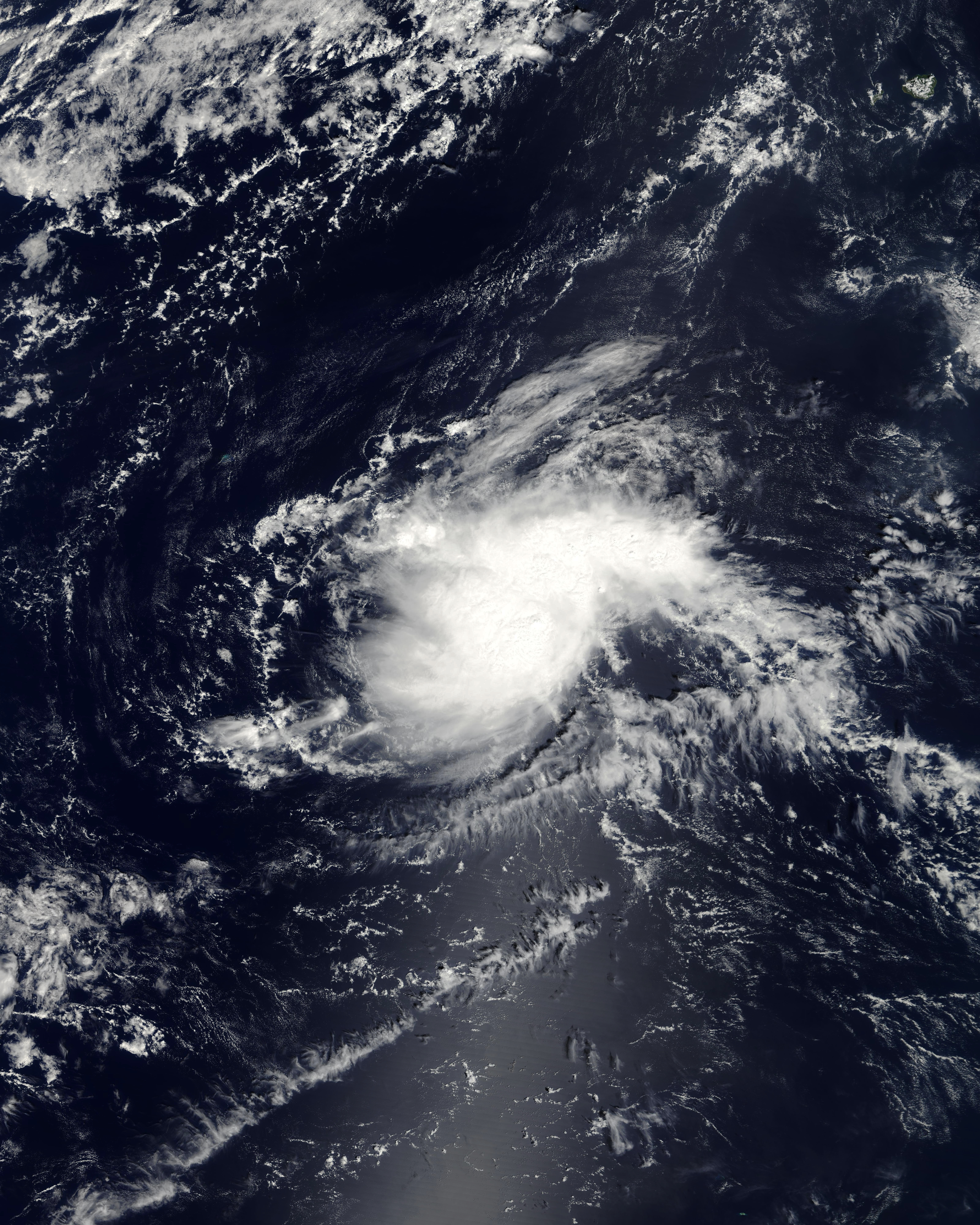
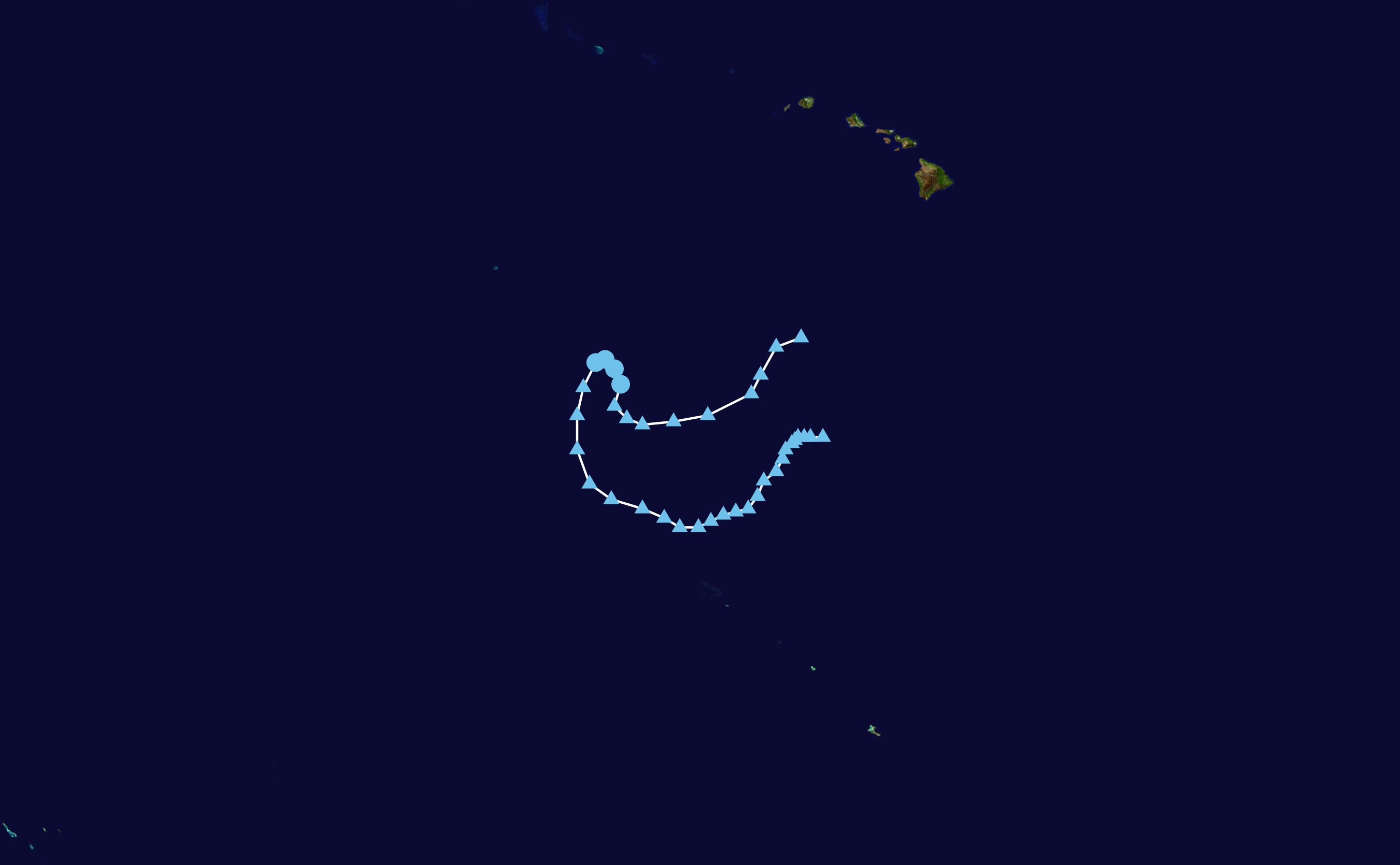
- Duration: October 13 – October 14
- Peak intensity: 35 mph (55 km/h) (1-min); 1007 mbar (hPa)

In the middle of October, the Intertropical Convergence Zone extended across the central Pacific Ocean, resembling an extension of the monsoon trough. An area of disturbed weather formed well to the southwest of Hawaii, organizing slowly for several days. Late on October 13, after the development of a low-level circulation and persistent convection, the CPHC classified the system as Tropical Depression Four-C about 750 mi (1,210 km) southwest of Honolulu, Hawaii. Upon being classified, the depression was located in an unusual steering flow that caused it to track eastward. Due to the approach of an upper-level trough, it was expected to dissipate quickly from wind shear, although forecasters noted the possibility for the trough to provide an outflow channel, which might allow strengthening. On October 14, strong wind shear removed the convection completely from the center, and the system degenerated into a remnant low.

The remnant circulation continued slowly eastward, dissipating on October 16. Concurrently, the convection tracked northeastward ahead of the upper-level trough, which contributed to heavy rainfall and flooding on the island of Hawaii on October 17. The rainfall event coincided with the 2006 Kiholo Bay earthquake striking the area.

=== Hurricane Paul ===
- Category 2 hurricane (SSHWS)
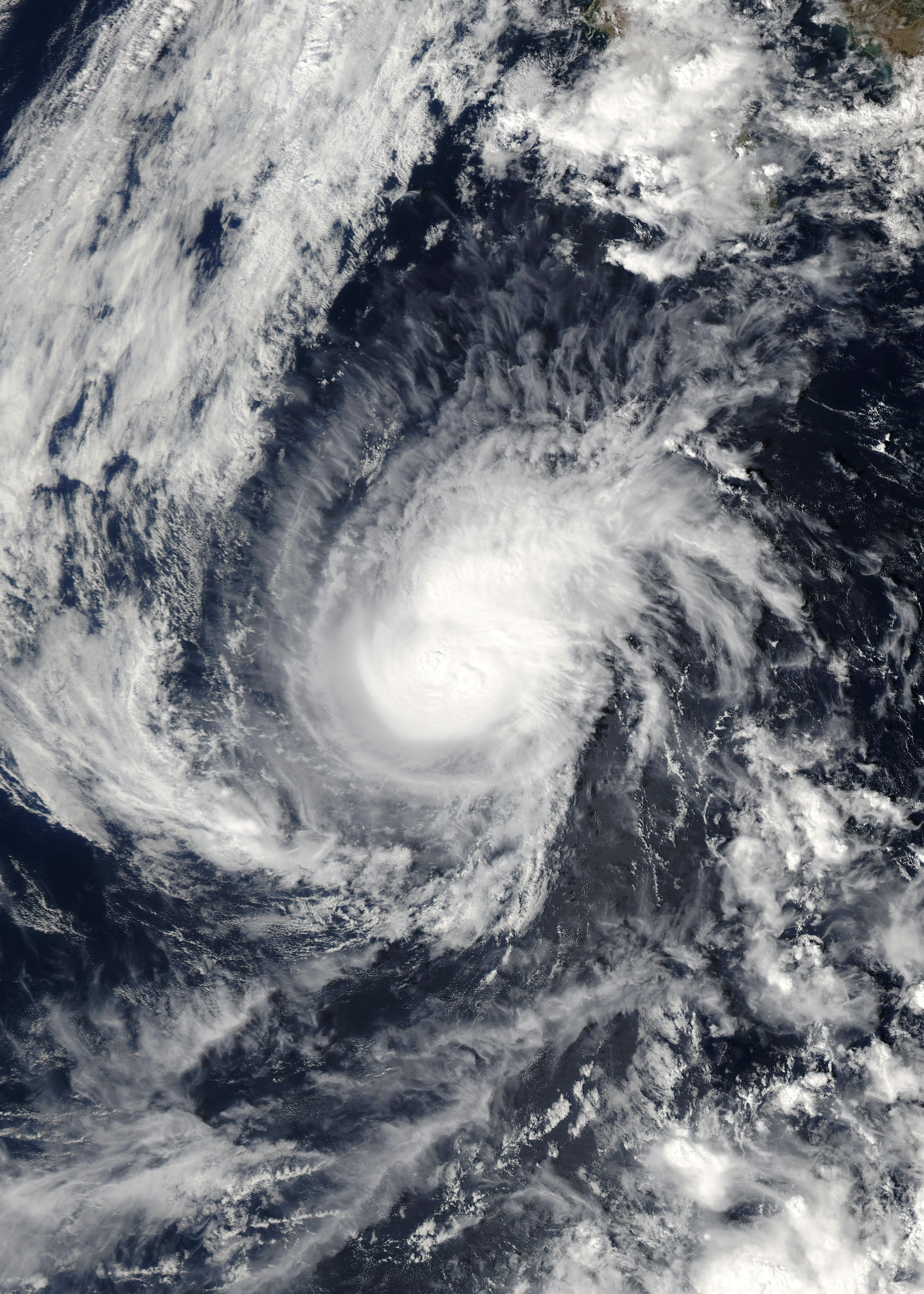
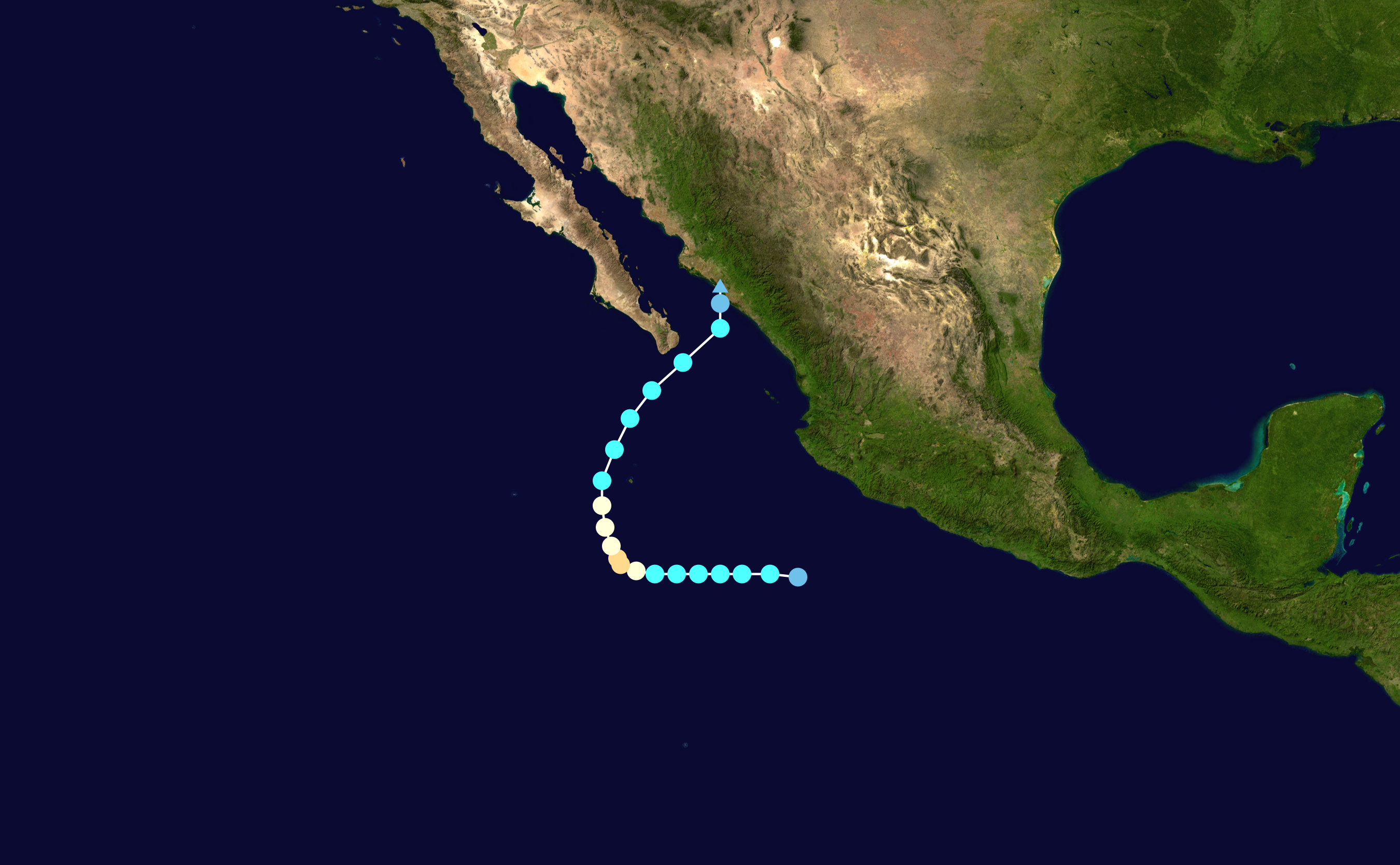
- Duration: October 21 – October 26
- Peak intensity: 105 mph (165 km/h) (1-min); 970 mbar (hPa)

Hurricane Paul developed from an area of disturbed weather on October 21, and slowly intensified as it moved into an area of warm waters and progressively decreasing wind shear. Paul attained hurricane status on October 23, and later that day it reached its peak intensity of 105 mph (170 km/h), a strong Category 2 hurricane on the Saffir–Simpson scale. A strong trough turned the hurricane to the north and northeast into an area of strong vertical shear, and Paul weakened to a tropical storm on October 24, later passing just south of the Baja California Peninsula. Paul weakened to a tropical depression on October 25 a short distance off the coast of Mexico, and after briefly turning away from the coast it made landfall on northwestern Sinaloa on October 26.

Paul was the third hurricane to threaten western Mexico in the season, the others being Hurricanes John and Lane. Rough surf killed two people along Baja California Sur, while two deaths from flooding were reported in Sinaloa. Paul dropped moderate rainfall across mainland Mexico, including a 24-hour total of 2.28 inches (58 mm) in Mazatlán, Sinaloa. Damage totaled more than $35 million (2006 MXN, $3.2 million 2006 USD).

=== Tropical Depression Eighteen-E ===
- Tropical depression (SSHWS)
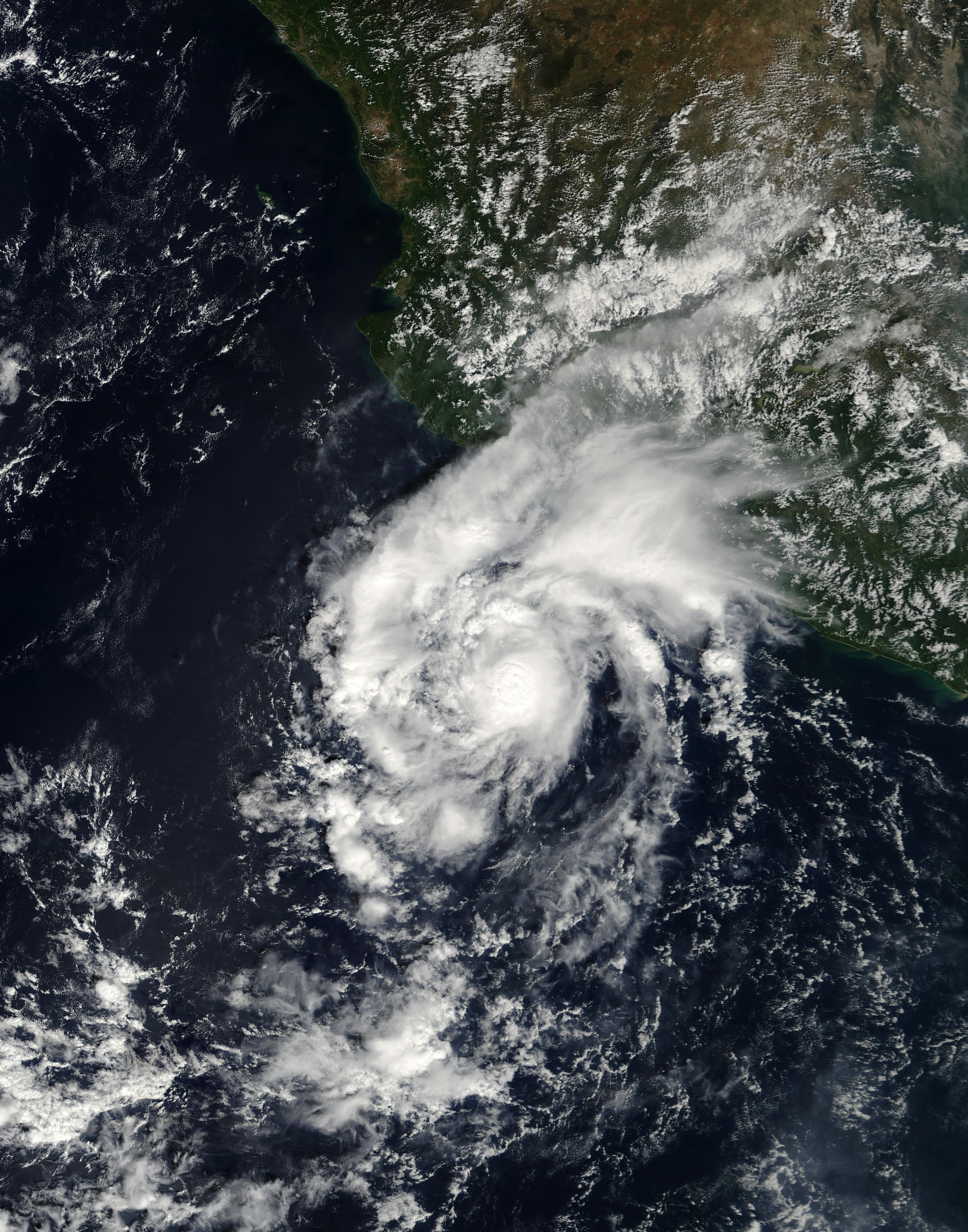
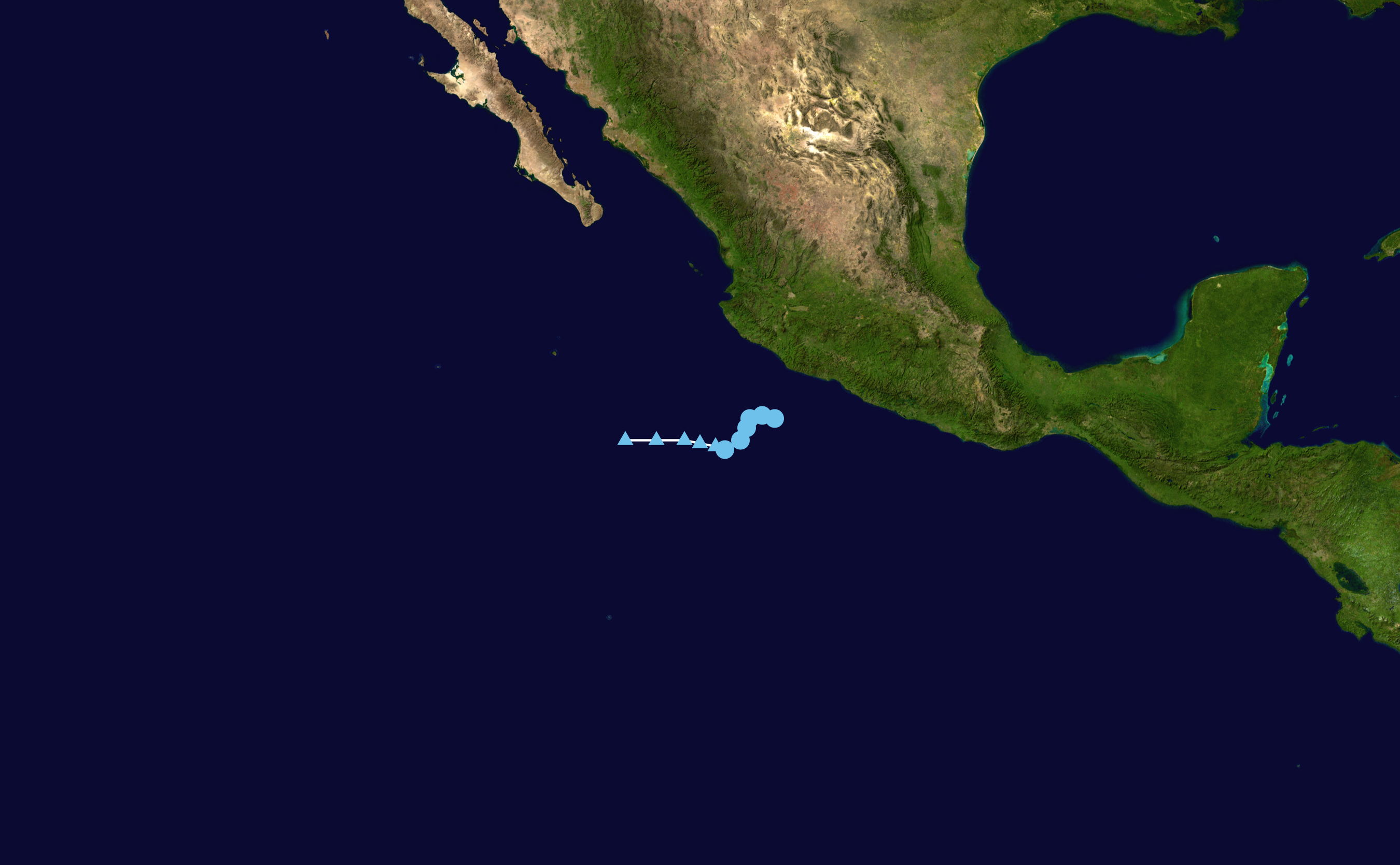
- Duration: October 26 – October 27
- Peak intensity: 35 mph (55 km/h) (1-min); 1007 mbar (hPa)

The origins of Tropical Depression Eighteen-E were from a tropical wave that exited the coast of Africa on October 7. It briefly spawned a low-pressure area as the wave continued westward without development. On October 20, the wave entered the Pacific Ocean, developing an area of thunderstorms about four days later. By 1200 UTC on October 26, a tropical depression formed about 155 mi (250 km) south of Manzanillo. Initially, Tropical Depression Eighteen-E was located in an area of light wind shear, and the NHC anticipated further organization and strengthening to near hurricane status. The tropical depression initially maintained a steady westward motion away from the Mexican coastline, due to a ridge north of the cyclone. By October 17, convection had decreased, and the depression was not forecast to intensify as much. Possibly due to intrusion of dry air, the circulation became exposed from the thunderstorms, and having weakened, it turned to a southward drift. By 0000 UTC on October 28, the system had weakened to a non-convective remnant low, which dissipated the following day.

=== Tropical Storm Rosa ===
- Tropical storm (SSHWS)
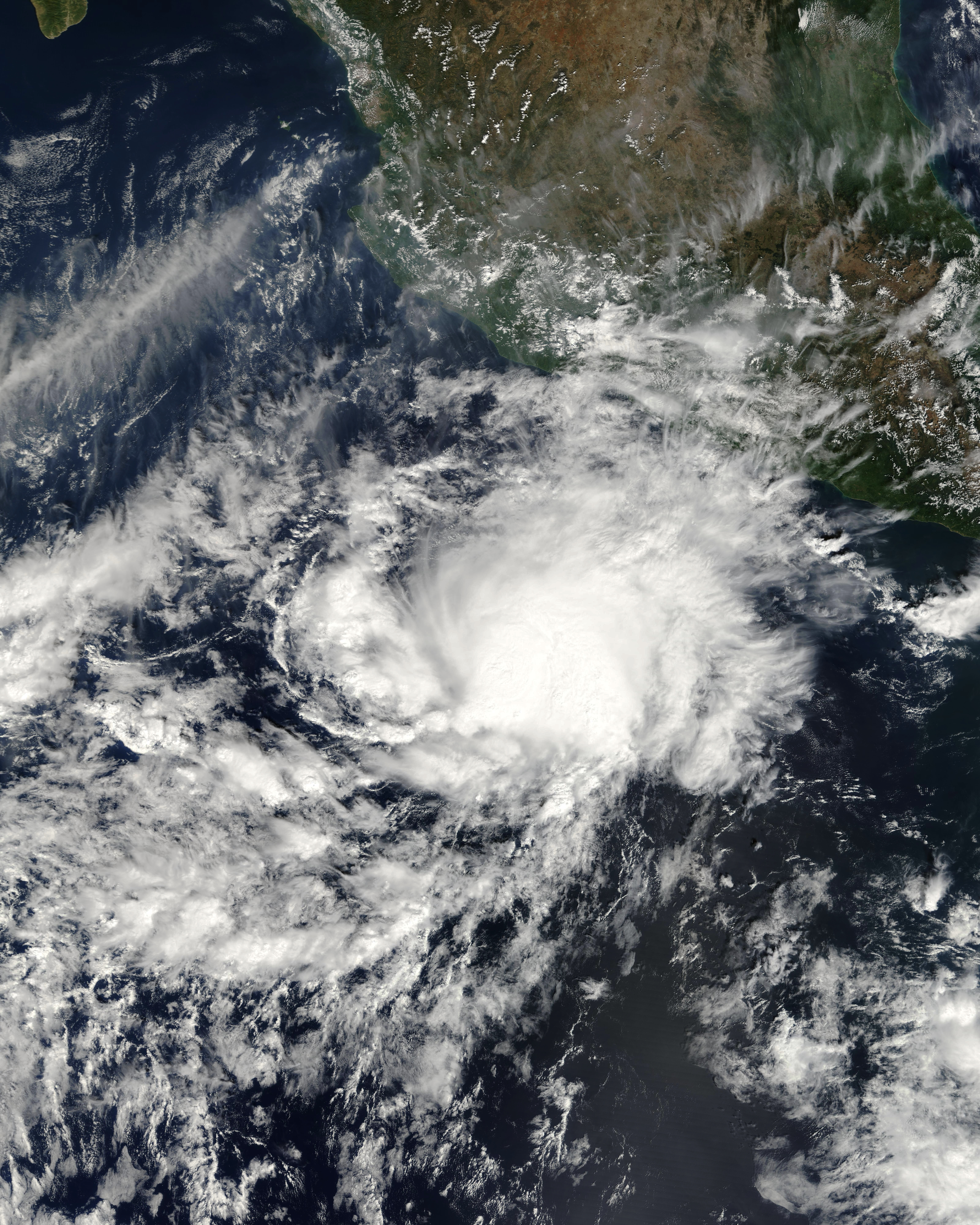
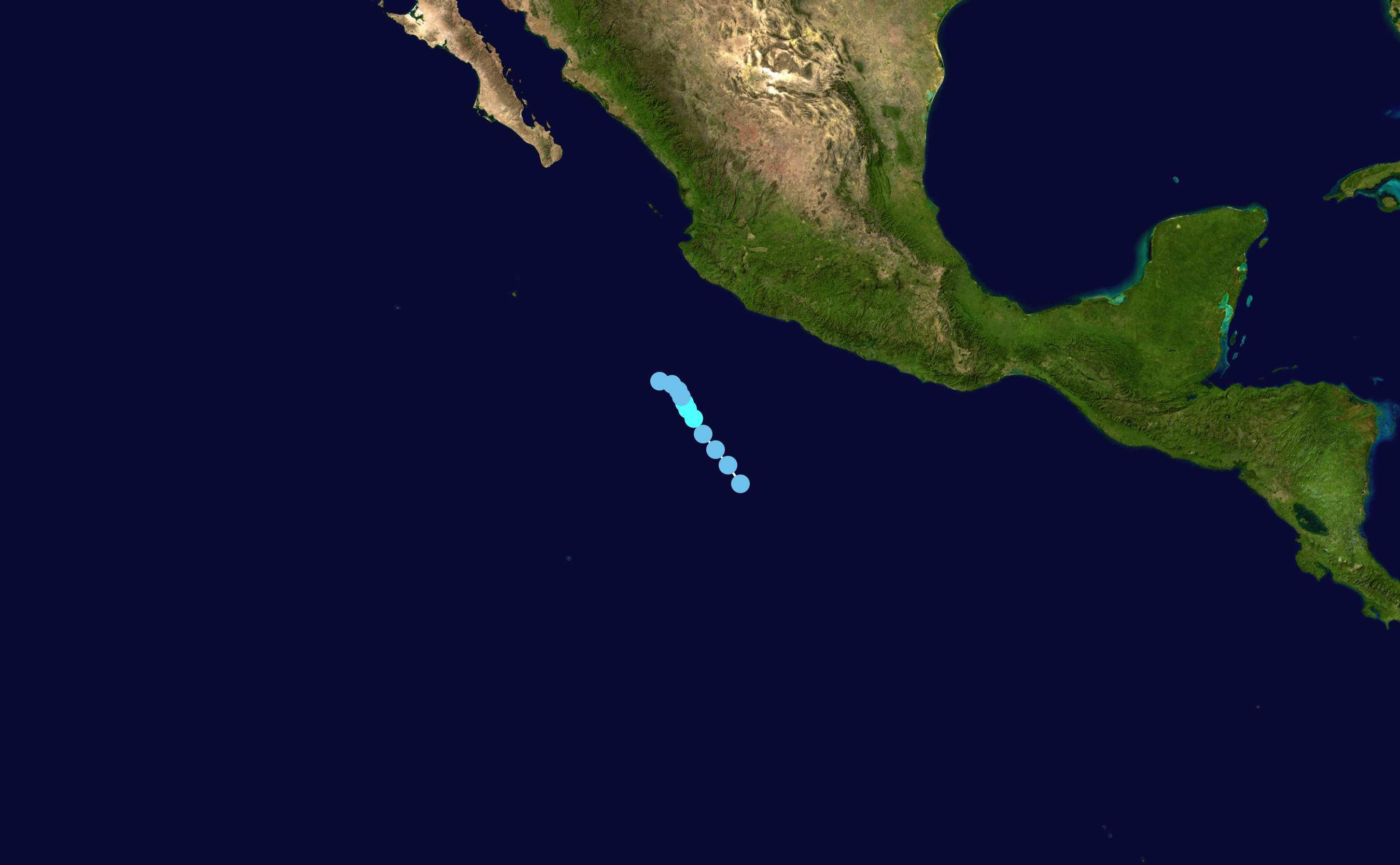
- Duration: November 8 – November 10
- Peak intensity: 40 mph (65 km/h) (1-min); 1002 mbar (hPa)

A tropical wave exited western Africa on October 22 and continued westward into the Pacific on November 2, spawning a tropical depression on November 8 about 440 mi (710 km) south of Manzanillo, Colima. Environmental conditions appeared favorable, although wind shear removed the convection from the circulation. Throughout its duration, the storm maintained a northwest track through a weakness in a subtropical ridge. By November 9, a new area of convection persisted near the center, and a banding feature formed. Despite the shear, the depression was upgraded to Tropical Storm Rosa, although the shear prevented intensification beyond its peak of 40 mph (65 km/h). Rosa remained a tropical storm for only 18 hours, becoming a tropical depression early on November 10 and dissipating later that day. Rosa was the first tropical storm in the basin to develop during November since 2000, and was also the first tropical depression to form in the month since 2002's Tropical Depression Sixteen-E. No impact was reported from the storm.

=== Tropical Depression Twenty-E ===
- Tropical depression (SSHWS)
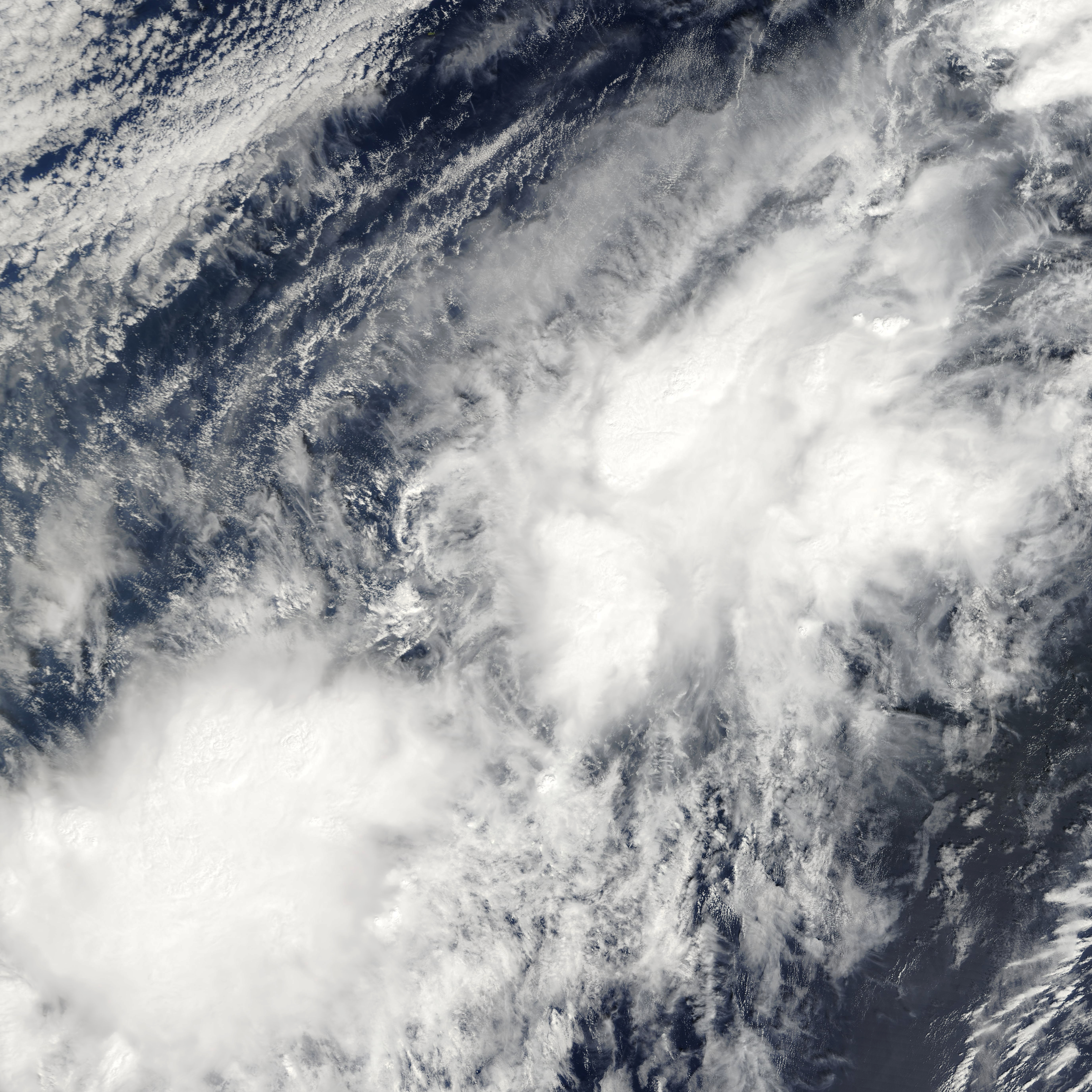
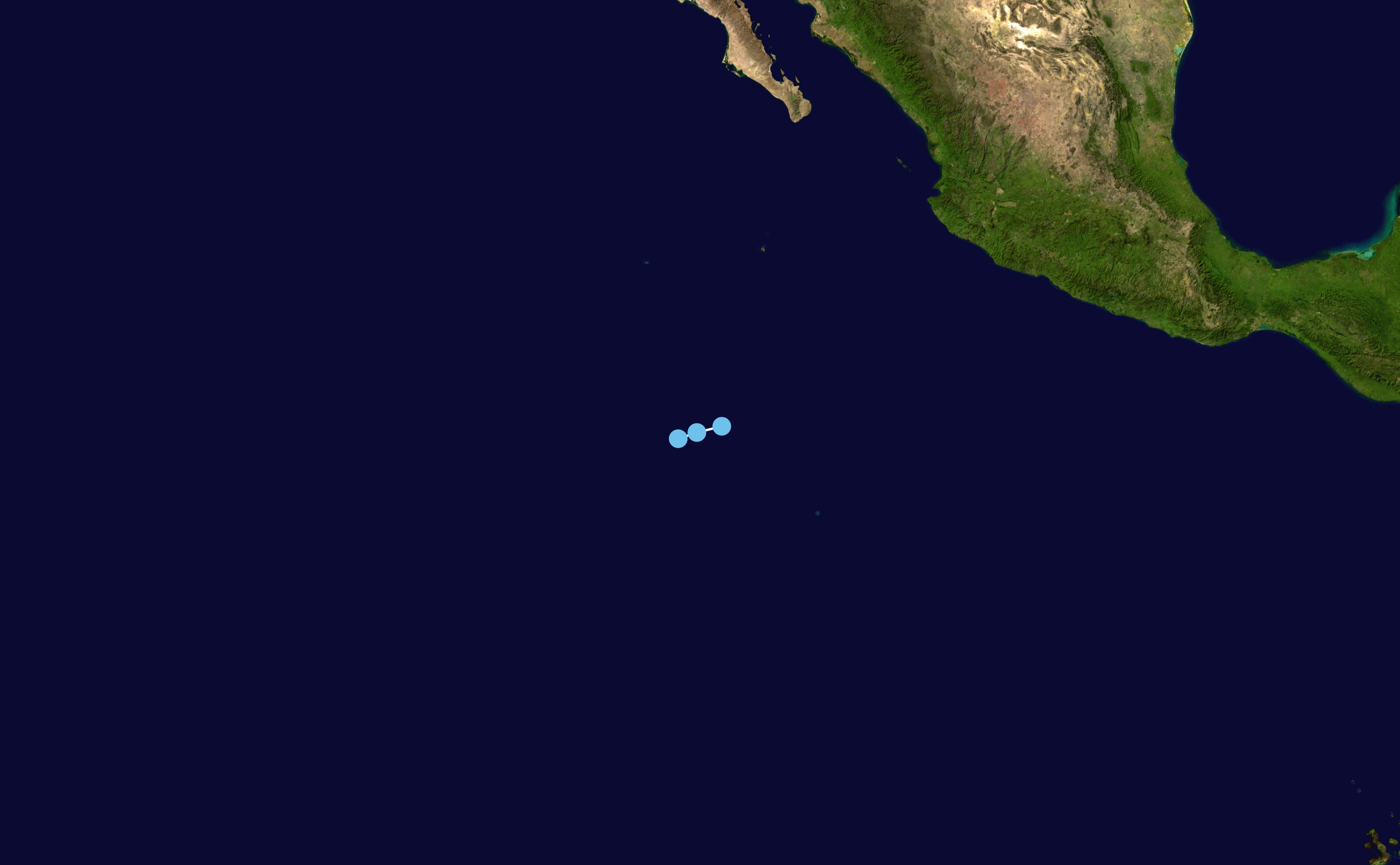
- Duration: November 11 – November 11
- Peak intensity: 35 mph (55 km/h) (1-min); 1007 mbar (hPa)

A tropical wave moved off the western coast of Africa on October 21, briefly developing two weak low-pressure areas before the wave crossed into the Pacific Ocean on November 1. Thunderstorm activity slowly increased as the wave interacted within the Intertropical Convergence Zone. After a curved band of convection developed, it is estimated the system formed into Tropical Depression Twenty-E around 0000 UTC on November 11, about 550 mi (890 km) southwest of Manzanillo. Throughout its duration, the depression never completely separated from the Intertropical Convergence Zone. When the NHC issued its first advisory on the depression, the agency predicted slight intensification to tropical storm status and for the depression to last at least two days. This was due to a forecast of gradually increasing wind shear after the first 24 hours. Instead, the circulation became very elongated; it is estimated the cyclone degenerated into a trough by late on November 11.

=== Hurricane Sergio ===
- Category 2 hurricane (SSHWS)
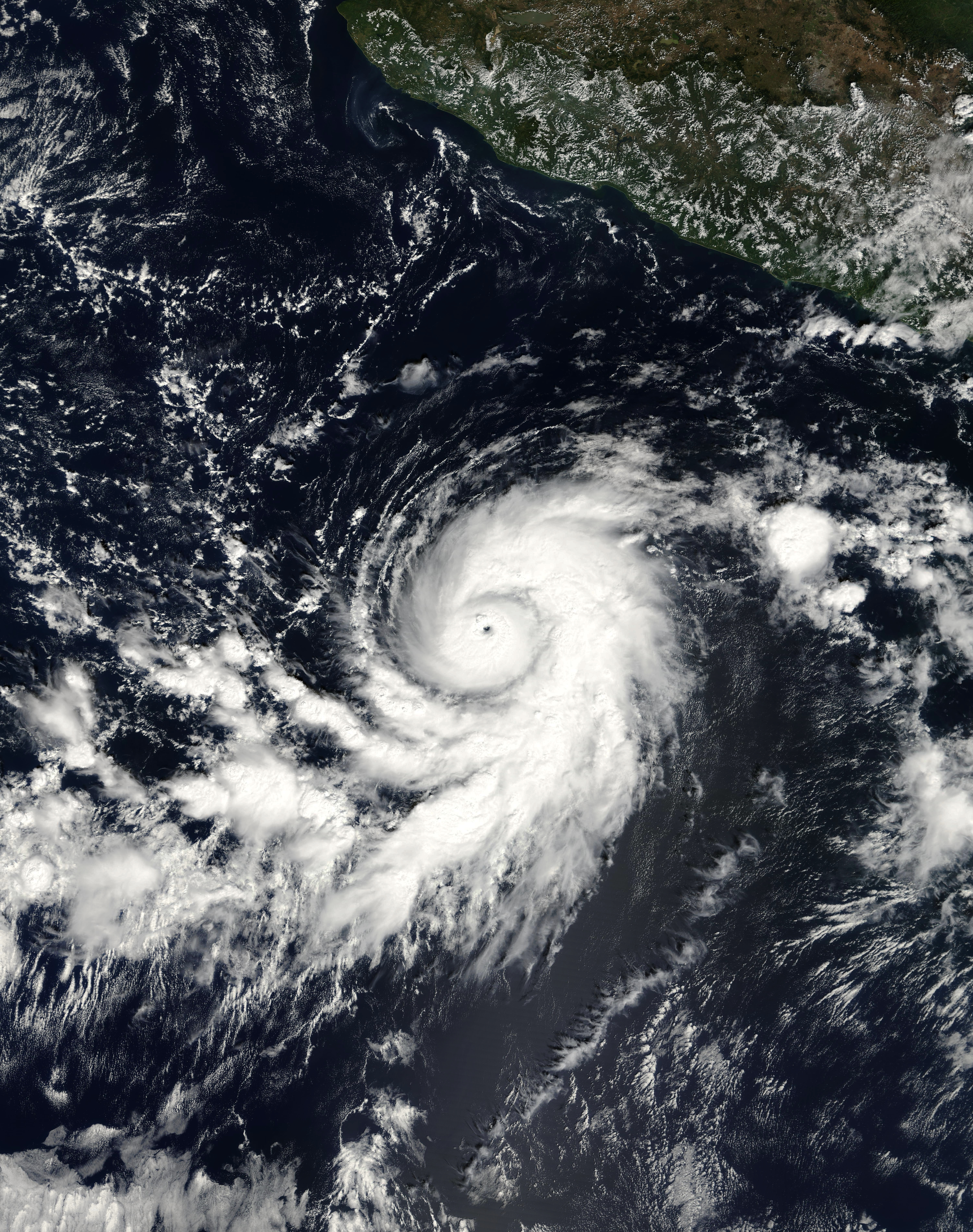
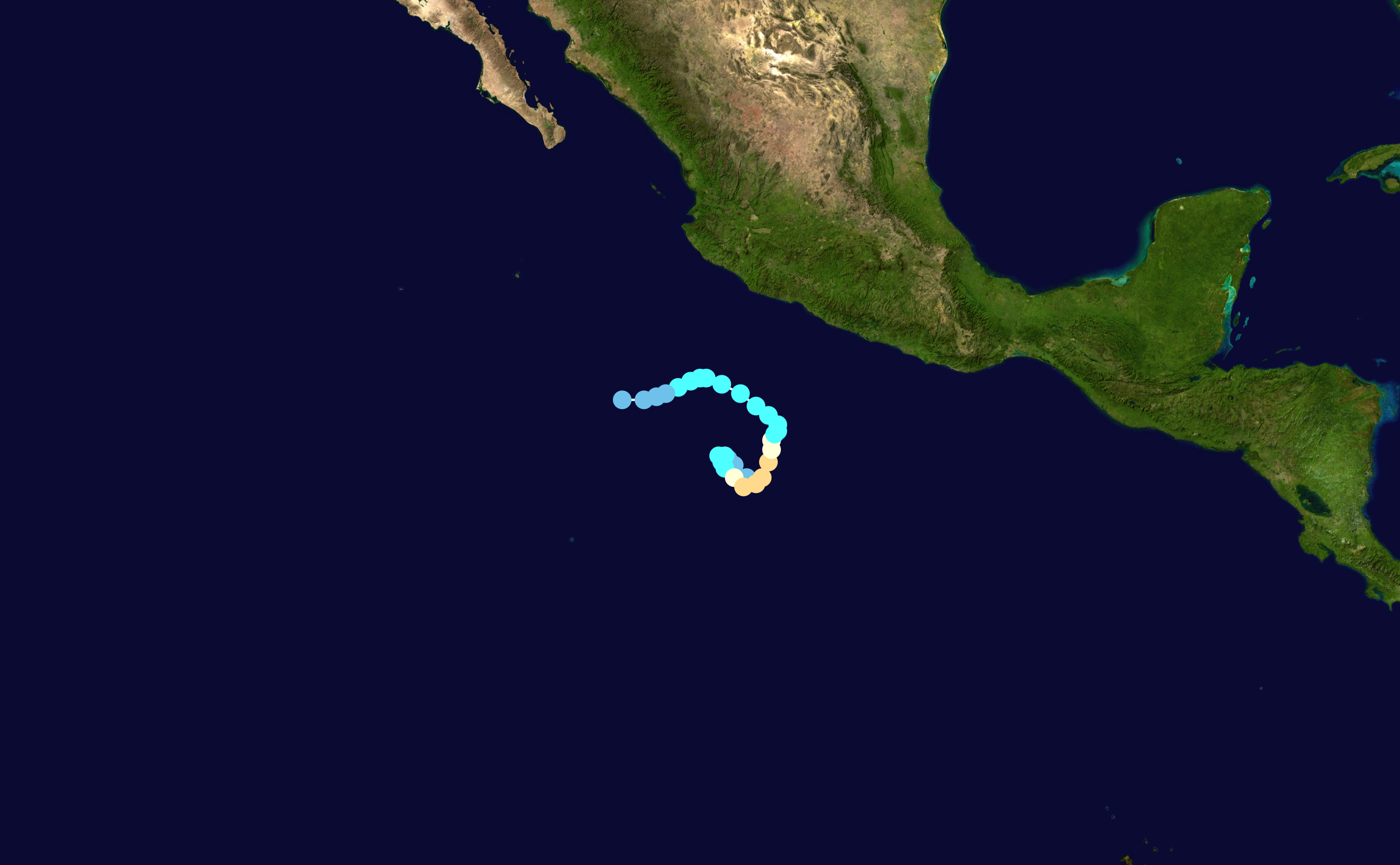
- Duration: November 13 – November 20
- Peak intensity: 110 mph (175 km/h) (1-min); 965 mbar (hPa)

A tropical wave entered the eastern Pacific on November 7, and continued westward. An area of convection along the wave became more concentrated and organized on November 12 while located about 400 miles (640 km) south of Acapulco. A day later, the system developed into Tropical Depression Twenty-One-E while located about 460 miles (740 km) south of Manzanillo, Mexico. Initially, the tropical depression tracked to the northwest, intensifying into Tropical Storm Sergio on November 14. With deep convection, prominent rainbands, low wind shear, and a moist environment, Sergio intensified as it turned southeastward, steered by a trough to its northeast. Sergio attained hurricane status on November 15 while located about 420 miles (680 km) southwest of Acapulco. With a small, distinct eye located in the center of the deep convection, Sergio rapidly intensified to attain peak winds of 110 mph (180 km/h) about 6 hours after becoming a hurricane. Shortly after peaking, Sergio began weakening as shear increased, as its movement turned to the north and northwest. The thunderstorms waxed and waned, causing Sergio to weaken back to a tropical storm on November 17. A day later, the storm made its closest approach to land, about 225 miles (362 km) southwest of Michoacán. On November 20, Sergio weakened to tropical depression status, and a day later the circulation dissipated, about 320 miles (510 km) west-northwest of where it originally formed.

Sergio produced light rainfall along the coast of Mexico, peaking at 1.97 inches (50 mm) at Tierra Colorada in Guerrero.

=== Other system ===
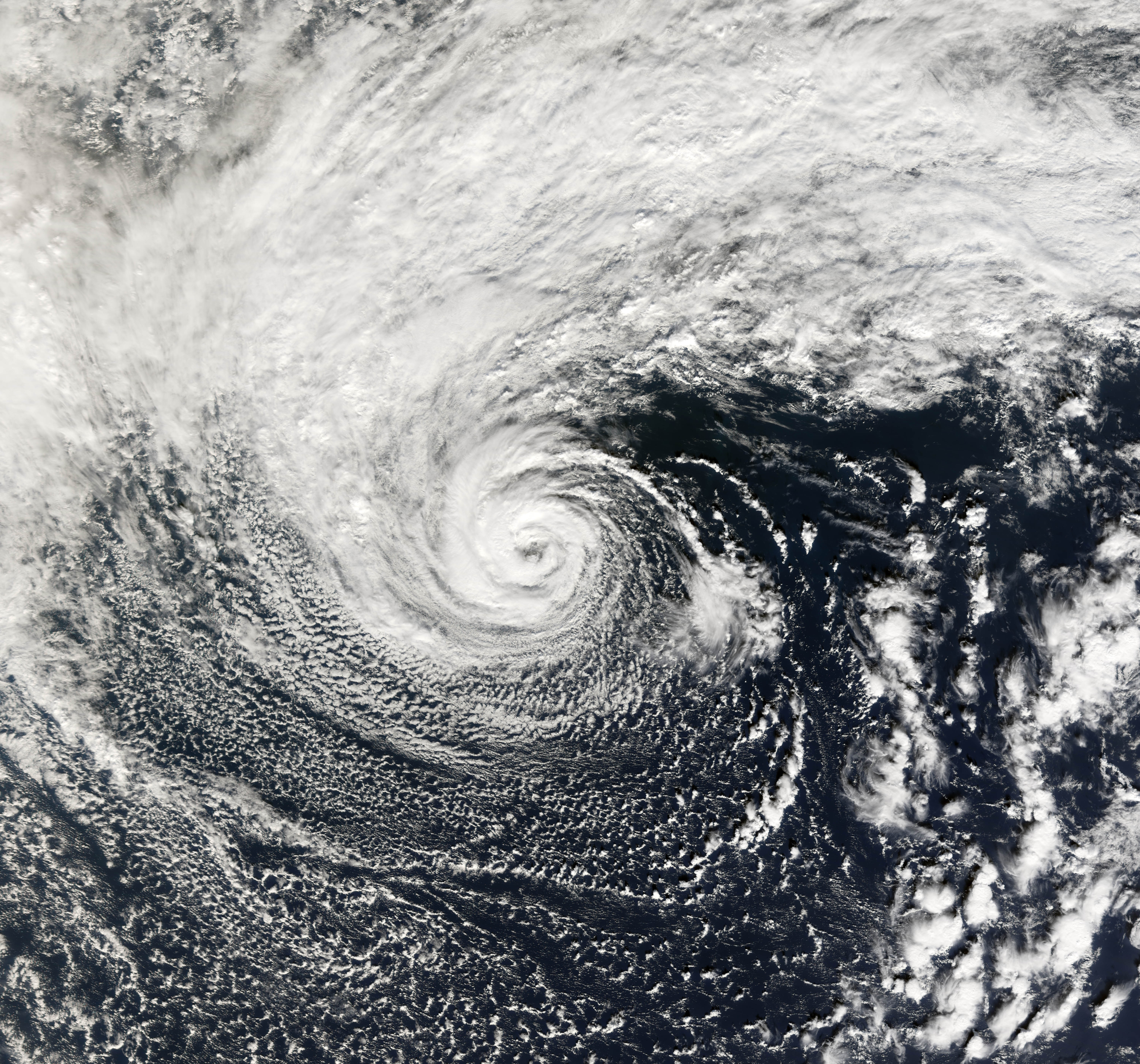
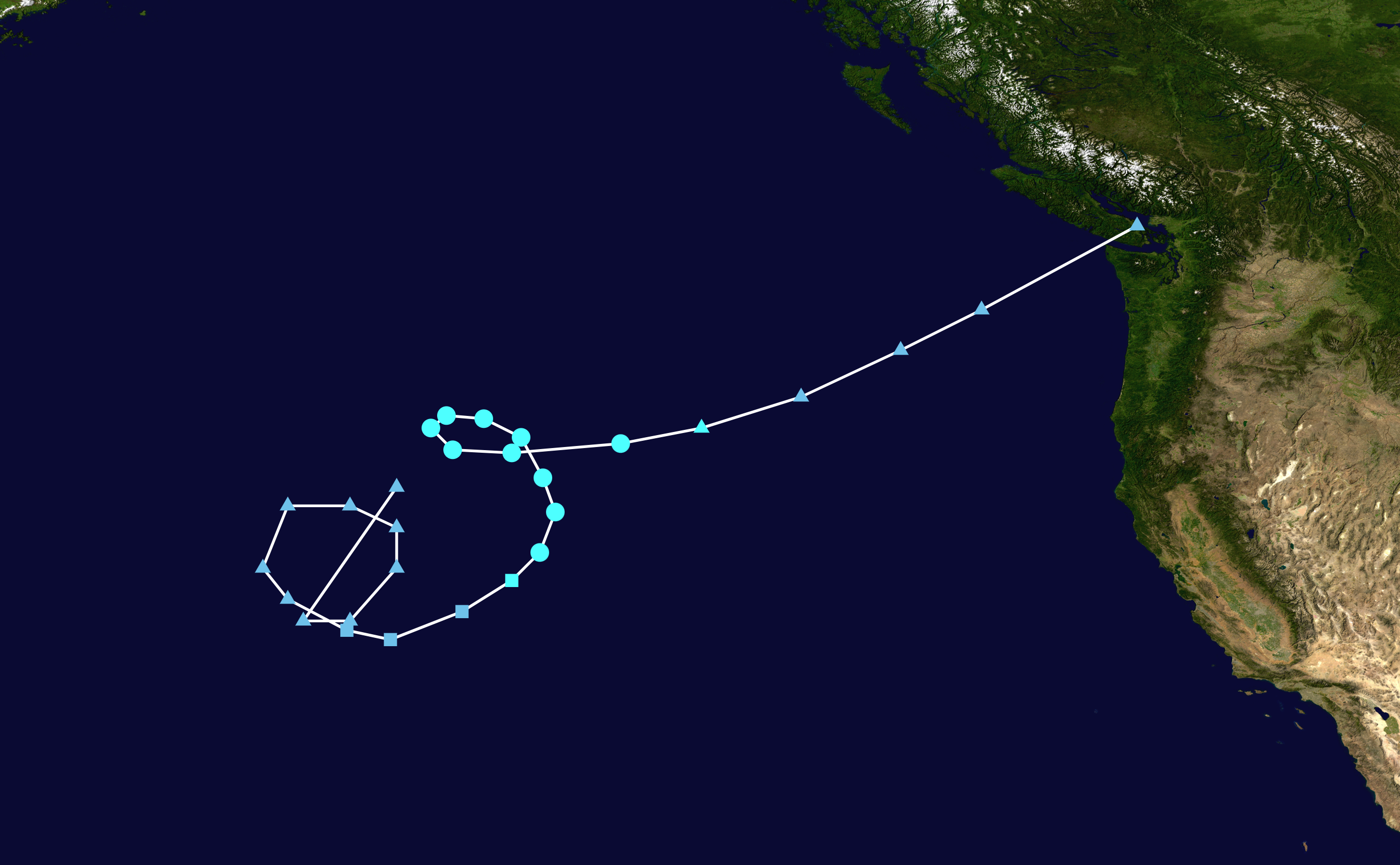
Satellite imagery (left) and track map (right) of the October central Pacific storm

On October 28, a cut-off extratropical cyclone stalled over the northeast Pacific Ocean, over water temperatures 2 °C (36 °F) above-normal. By October 31, the system had acquired convection, a warmer-than-normal core, and an eye-like feature. During this time, the storm had moved eastward, then northeastward, before turning northwestward. On November 1, the system attained peak winds estimated at 65 mph (100 km/h), as it developed its most defined convection. Subsequently, the storm slowly weakened due to increased wind shear and cooler waters. The storm looped counter-clockwise, and headed east, losing its convection by November 3 On November 3, the storm made landfall on the Olympic Peninsula in the State of Washington, bringing tropical storm-like conditions to the Pacific Northwest, including sustained winds at 40 mph (64 km/h) and wind gusts up to 60 mph (97 km/h). The National Weather Service issued a High Wind Warning for the southern Washington coast and Northwest Oregon. The system also brought heavy rain to portions of Vancouver Island. Meteorologists debated the status of storm, and whether or not it had obtained tropical or subtropical characteristics.

== Storm names ==
The following list of names was used for named storms that formed in the North Pacific Ocean east of 140°W during 2006. This was the same list used for the 2000 season. No names were retired from the list by the World Meteorological Organization (WMO) following the 2006 season, and it was used again for the 2012 season.

- Aletta
- Bud
- Carlotta
- Daniel *
- Emilia
- Fabio
- Gilma
- Hector
- Ileana
- John
- Kristy
- Lane
- Miriam
- Norman
- Olivia
- Paul
- Rosa
- Sergio
- Tara (unused)
- Vicente (unused)
- Willa (unused)
- Xavier (unused)
- Yolanda (unused)
- Zeke (unused)

For named storms that form in the North Pacific between 140°W and the International Date Line, the names come from a series of four rotating lists. Names are used one after the other without regard to year, and when the bottom of one list is reached, the next named storm receives the name at the top of the next list. One named storm formed within the area in 2006. Named storms in the table above that crossed into the area during the year are noted (*).

- Ioke

=== Retirement ===
The name Ioke was retired from future use in the central Pacific by the WMO in the spring of 2007. The name Iopa was chosen as its replacement.

== Season effects ==
This is a table of all of the storms that formed in the 2006 Pacific hurricane season. It includes their name, duration, peak classification and intensities, areas affected, damage, and death totals. Deaths in parentheses are additional and indirect (an example of an indirect death would be a traffic accident), but were still related to that storm. Damage and deaths include totals while the storm was extratropical, a wave, or a low, and all of the damage figures are in 2006 USD.

Saffir–Simpson scale
TD	TS	C1	C2	C3	C4	C5

2006 Pacific hurricane season statistics
Storm name	Dates active	Storm category at peak intensity	Max 1-min wind mph (km/h)	Min. press. (mbar)	Areas affected	Damage (US$)	Deaths	Ref(s).
Aletta	May 27 – 30	Tropical storm	45 (75)	1002	None	Minimal	None	
Two-E	June 3–5	Tropical depression	35 (55)	1005	Southwestern Mexico, Western Mexico	Minimal	None	
Bud	July 11–16	Category 3 hurricane	125 (205)	953	Hawaii	None	None	
Carlotta	July 12–16	Category 1 hurricane	85 (140)	981	None	None	None	
Daniel	July 16–26	Category 4 hurricane	150 (240)	933	Hawaii	Minimal	None	
Emilia	July 21–28	Tropical storm	65 (100)	990	Southwestern Mexico, Western Mexico, Baja California Peninsula, Southwestern United States	Minimal	None	
Fabio	July 31 – August 3	Tropical storm	50 (85)	1000	None	None	None	
Gilma	August 1–3	Tropical storm	40 (65)	1004	None	None	None	
Hector	August 15–23	Category 2 hurricane	110 (175)	966	None	None	None	
Ioke	August 20–27 (Note: Though Hurricane Ioke did not make landfall, its strike on Wake Island is included in the table, due to the severe damage on the island.)	Category 5 hurricane	160 (260)	915	Johnston Atoll, Wake Island, Minamitorishima, Southern Alaska (before crossover)	$88 million	None	
Ileana	August 21–27	Category 3 hurricane	125 (205)	951	Socorro Island	Minimal	1	
John	August 28 – September 4	Category 4 hurricane	130 (215)	948	Guerrero, Michoacán, Baja California Sur, Arizona, California, New Mexico, Texas	$60.9 million	5	
Kristy	August 30 – September 8	Category 1 hurricane	80 (130)	985	None	None	None	
Lane	September 13–17	Category 3 hurricane	125 (205)	952	Southwestern Mexico, Western Mexico, Northwestern Mexico, Southwestern United States	$203 million	4	
Miriam	September 16–18	Tropical storm	45 (75)	999	None	None	None	
Two-C	September 19–20	Tropical depression	35 (55)	1007	None	None	None	
Three-C	September 26–27	Tropical depression	35 (55)	1008	None	None	None	
Norman	October 9–15	Tropical storm	50 (85)	1000	Southwestern Mexico, (Note: In its report on Tropical Storm Norman, the National Hurricane Center did not specify whether the storm moved ashore or not. However, in its report to the World Meteorological Organization, officials from Mexico included Norman in the storms that moved ashore along the country.) Western Mexico	Minimal	None	
Olivia	October 9–12	Tropical storm	45 (75)	1000	None	None	None	
Four-C	October 13–14	Tropical depression	35 (55)	1007	None	None	None	
Paul	October 21–26	Category 2 hurricane	105 (165)	970	Oaxaca, Guerrero, Baja California Sur, Sinaloa	$3.2 million	4	
Eighteen-E	October 26–27	Tropical depression	35 (55)	1007	None	None	None	
Rosa	November 8–10	Tropical storm	40 (65)	1002	None	None	None	
Twenty-E	November 11	Tropical depression	35 (55)	1007	None	None	None	
Sergio	November 13–20	Category 2 hurricane	110 (175)	965	Guerrero	None	None	
Season aggregates
25 systems	May 27 – November 20		160 (260)	915		$355 million	14	

== See also ==
- Tropical cyclones in 2006
- List of Pacific hurricanes
- Pacific hurricane season
- 2006 Atlantic hurricane season
- 2006 Pacific typhoon season
- 2006 North Indian Ocean cyclone season
- South-West Indian Ocean cyclone seasons: 2005–06, 2006–07
- Australian region cyclone seasons: 2005–06, 2006–07
- South Pacific cyclone seasons: 2005–06, 2006–07
