= Tropical Storm Lidia (1981) =

Pacific tropical storm in 1981

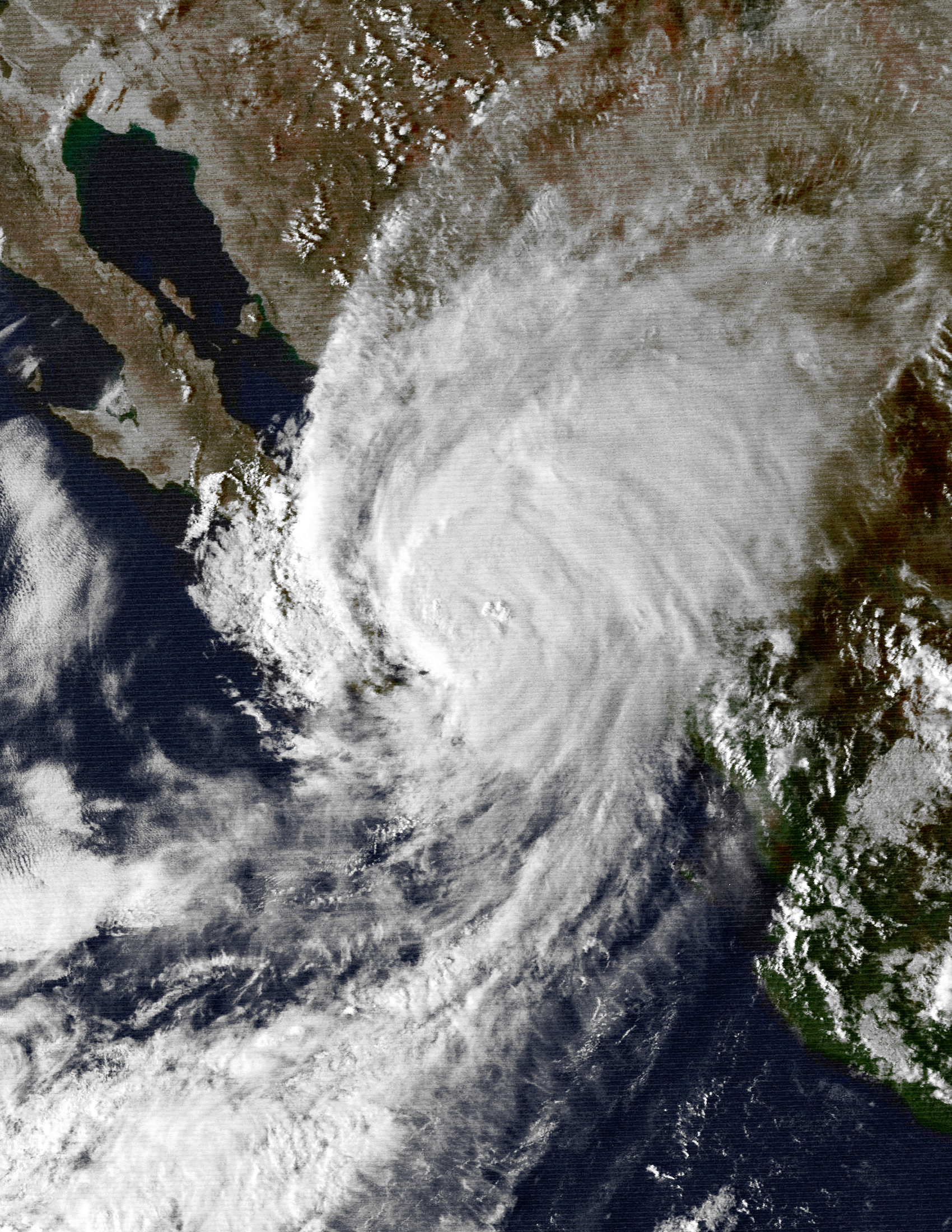
- Tropical Storm Lidia near landfall

Meteorological history
- Formed: October 6, 1981
- Dissipated: October 8, 1981

Tropical storm
- 1-minute sustained (SSHWS/NWS)
- Highest winds: 50 mph (85 km/h)

Overall effects
- Fatalities: 100
- Damage: $80 million (1981 USD)
- Areas affected: Northwestern Mexico
- IBTrACS
- Part of the 1981 Pacific hurricane season

Tropical Storm Lidia was the deadliest tropical cyclone of the 1981 Pacific hurricane season. On October 6, a tropical depression formed and strengthened into a tropical storm six hours later. Lidia brushed the southern tip of the Mexican state of Baja California Sur and made landfall just south of Los Mochis in Sinaloa on October 8 as a mid-level tropical storm. Once onshore, Tropical Storm Lidia rapidly weakened and dissipated the same day. It inflicted heavy rain and flooding throughout parts of northwestern Mexico, especially Sinaloa. Overall, Lidia killed 100 people and caused at least $80 million in damage. (Note: All damage totals are in 1981 values of their respective currencies.)

== Meteorological history ==
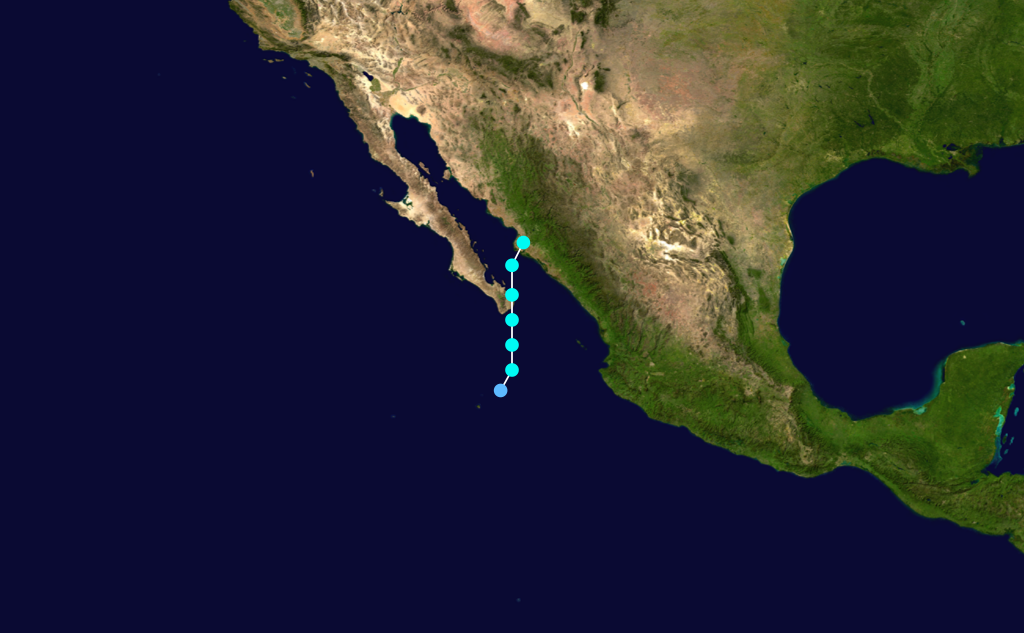
Map plotting the storm's track and intensity, according to the Saffir–Simpson scale Map key Saffir–Simpson scale Tropical depression (≤38 mph, ≤62 km/h) Tropical storm (39–73 mph, 63–118 km/h) Category 1 (74–95 mph, 119–153 km/h) Category 2 (96–110 mph, 154–177 km/h) Category 3 (111–129 mph, 178–208 km/h) Category 4 (130–156 mph, 209–251 km/h) Category 5 (≥157 mph, ≥252 km/h) Unknown Storm type Tropical cyclone Subtropical cyclone Extratropical cyclone, remnant low, tropical disturbance, or monsoon depression

A tropical depression formed on October 6 while located 210 mi (340 km) south of Cabo San Lucas. Ahead of a southwesterly flow over Mexico, which was caused by a front, the depression intensified into Tropical Storm Lidia at 00:00 UTC on October 7. Lidia moved generally north, and reached its maximum windspeed of 50 mph (85 km/h). Despite encountering warm sea surface temperatures, which are generally favorable for intensification, Lidia slowly weakened as it moved towards the southern portion of the Baja California Peninsula. The tropical cyclone passed over the southern tip of the Baja California Peninsula at 17:00 UTC on October 7; at the time of the landfall Lidia was located about 67 mi (108 km) northwest of Cabo San Lucas. Two hours later, Lidia entered the Gulf of California, and turned to the northeast. Lidia made landfall on the shores of Sinaloa about 23 mi (37 km) south of Los Mochis on October 8, with winds of 45 mph (75 km/h). At 06:00 UTC that day, the Eastern Pacific Hurricane Center ended advisories as the tropical cyclone dissipated inland about 17 mi (27 km) northeast of that same place. The remnants of Lidia continued their northeast track, moving over Mexico, and ultimately tracked across the Southern United States, spurring a new frontal wave.

== Impact and aftermath ==
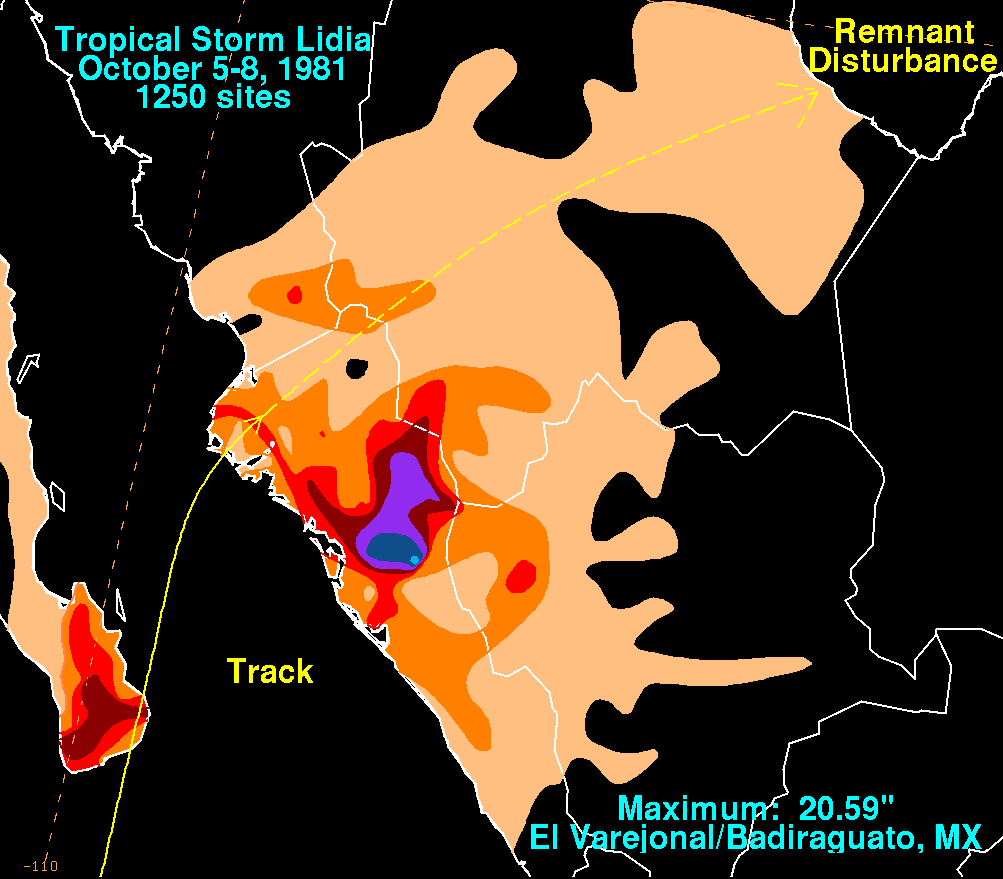
Rainfall Summary for Tropical Storm Lidia

Two hours prior to landfall, emergency warnings were issued, which relatively few people responded to. Tropical Storm Lidia caused flash flooding, with highest point point maxima was 20.59 in (523 mm) at El Varejona and Badiraguato in Sinaloa. Heavy rainfall sent water down a dry river bed in Pericos, killing 40 people, mostly children, as well as six soldiers died while attempting to save peasants from the flooding. In the northern part of Sinaloa, 42 were confirmed killed and 76 were initially rendered missing. Near Los Mochis, four people were killed. About 800 houses were also destroyed in that town. In Culiacán, eleven people were killed. Losses to cattle, crops, and fishing vessels were more than $80 million.

Electricity was cut off to two settlements, Guamúchil and Guasave. Telephone service was also cut off to Culiacán. Heavy rain caused flooding that cut off seven towns in Sinaloa from the outside world. It also contaminated the water supply in Culiacán, leaving many without clean drinking water. Almost a hundred villages were flooded, as were two dams. The Rio Fuerte burst its banks and flooded sixty settlements. It also forced evacuations, which were enforced by the Mexican Army. Mexican Federal Highway 15 was closed due to the storm, as was the Pacific Railroad. The highway was reopened shortly after the storm passed. Nationwide, 100 people were killed. This was enough to make it the deadliest tropical cyclone of its season; most of the casualties occurred in rural areas. A few days later, Hurricane Norma struck similar areas as Lidia escalated the devastation.

During the aftermath of the storm, food and clothing was brought to towns isolated by the storm. In Culiacán, churches, schools, and a baseball stadium served as temporary shelters for displaced persons. Rescue workers also searched for bodies of victims of both Lidia and the subsequent Hurricane Norma, which hit the same area a few days later. Due to the damage wrought by both Lidia and Norma, Sinaloa Governor Antonio Toledo Corro, declared his state a disaster area. He also asked the Mexican Federal Government for aid. Moisture from the remnants of Tropical Storm Lidia spread over extreme southeastern Arizona.

Despite the large loss of life from the storm, the name Lidia was not retired from use, and was reused in 1987.

== See also ==
- List of deadliest Pacific hurricanes
- Other storms with the same name
