= List of storms named Lidia =

The name Lidia has been used for six tropical cyclones in the East Pacific Ocean.

- Tropical Storm Lidia (1981) – a relatively weak but deadly tropical storm that made landfall in the Mexican state of Sinaloa
- Hurricane Lidia (1987) – Category 1 hurricane that moved parallel to Mexico
- Hurricane Lidia (1993) – Category 4 hurricane that made landfall in Sinaloa as a Category 2 hurricane, causing significant damage
- Tropical Storm Lidia (2005) – weak tropical storm that was absorbed by Hurricane Max
- Tropical Storm Lidia (2017) – large tropical storm that made landfall in Baja California Sur, causing severe damage
- Hurricane Lidia (2023) – a rapidly intensifying Category 4 hurricane that made landfall in the Mexican state of Jalisco

== See also ==
- Tropical Depression Lidy (1995) – a South-West Indian Ocean tropical cyclone with a similar name
