= Hurricane Lidia (1993) =

Category 4 Pacific hurricane in 1993

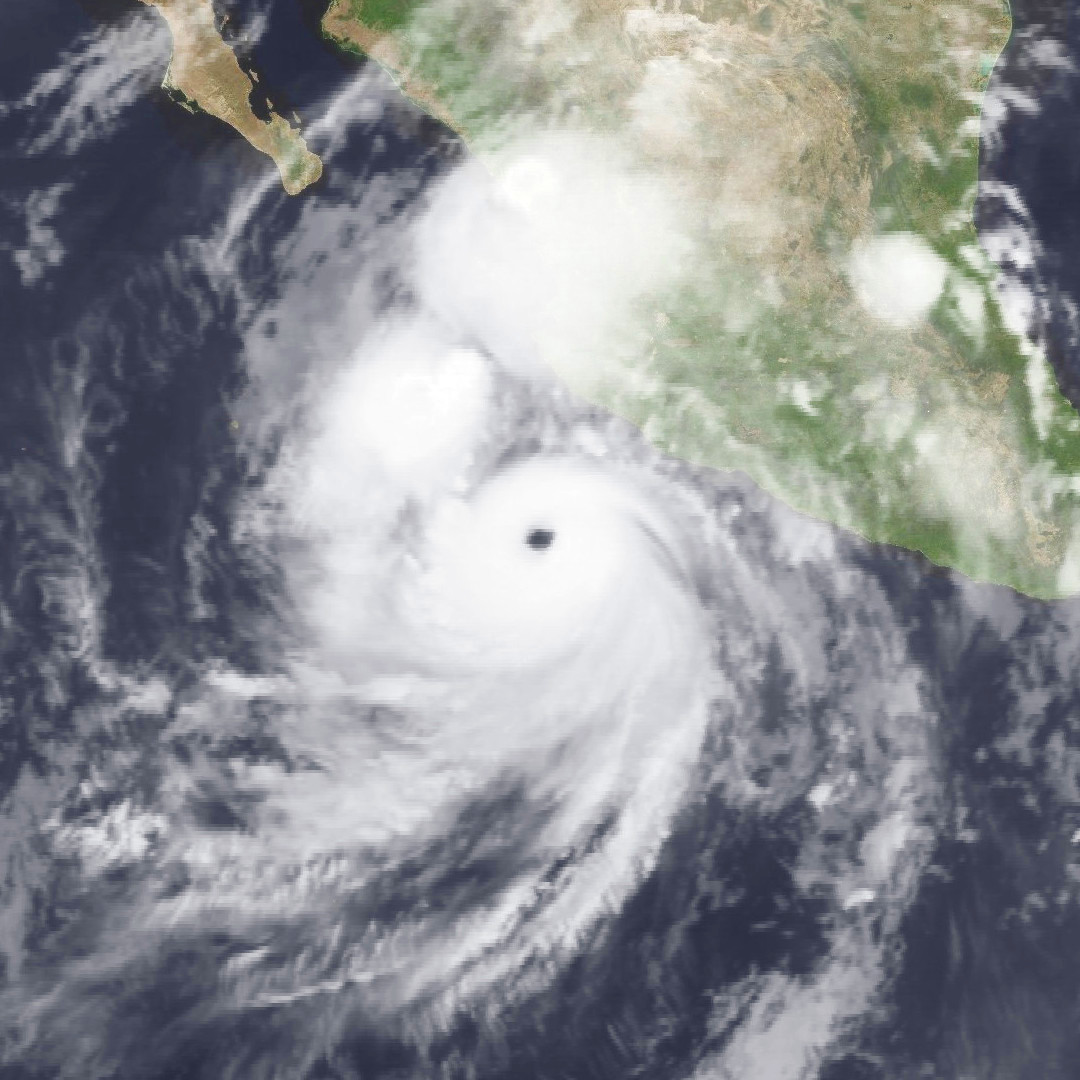
- Hurricane Lidia at peak intensity south of Mexico on September 11

Meteorological history
- Formed: September 8, 1993
- Dissipated: September 14, 1993

Category 4 major hurricane
- 1-minute sustained (SSHWS/NWS)
- Highest winds: 150 mph (240 km/h)
- Lowest pressure: 930 mbar (hPa); 27.46 inHg

Overall effects
- Fatalities: 8 total
- Damage: $8 million
- Areas affected: Mexico, Arkansas, Louisiana, Texas
- Part of the 1993 Pacific hurricane season

Hurricane Lidia was the strongest tropical cyclone of the 1993 Pacific hurricane season. Forming from a tropical wave on September 8, Lidia steadily organized and became a hurricane on September 10. The hurricane continued to strengthen while developing a well-defined eye, and peaked as a Category 4 hurricane on September 11. However, it weakened considerably before making landfall in Sinaloa as a Category 2 storm. Lidia dissipated near Austin on September 14 and was later absorbed by a cold front. Across Mexico, the hurricane killed seven people; over 100,000 people were forced to evacuate their homes. A total of 160 homes were destroyed and 10,000 people were left homeless because of the storm. In the United States, five people suffered injuries and storm damage totaled $8 million (1993 USD).

== Meteorological history ==
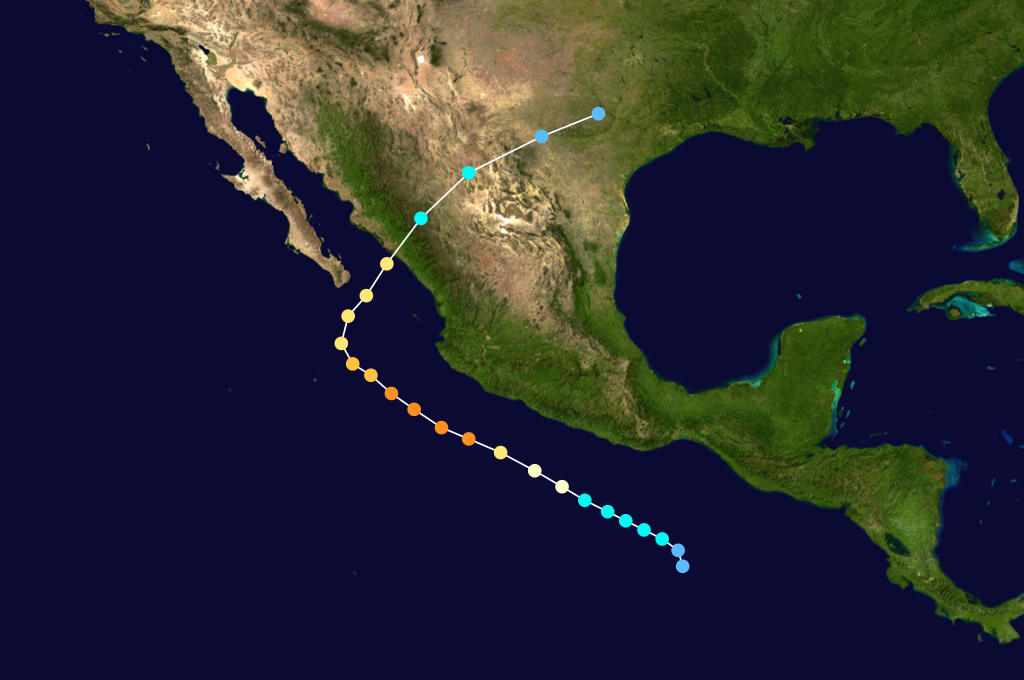
Map plotting the storm's track and intensity, according to the Saffir–Simpson scale Map key Saffir–Simpson scale Tropical depression (≤38 mph, ≤62 km/h) Tropical storm (39–73 mph, 63–118 km/h) Category 1 (74–95 mph, 119–153 km/h) Category 2 (96–110 mph, 154–177 km/h) Category 3 (111–129 mph, 178–208 km/h) Category 4 (130–156 mph, 209–251 km/h) Category 5 (≥157 mph, ≥252 km/h) Unknown Storm type Tropical cyclone Subtropical cyclone Extratropical cyclone, remnant low, tropical disturbance, or monsoon depression

A westward-moving tropical wave left the coast of Africa on August 24. Initially, shower activity along the wave axis was minimal, although it increased somewhat as the system approached the southern Lesser Antilles. It moved through the southwestern Caribbean Sea on September 3 and 4 without showing any signs of organization. The wave quickly emerged into the Pacific Ocean as it tracked just south of Central America. After September 7, shower activity began to increase and the cloud pattern became more organized. At this time, the disturbance was located about 200 mi (320 km) south of Salina Cruz. Following another drastic improvement in organization, the development well-defined banding features and a well-defined atmospheric circulation, the disturbance was upgraded into a tropical depression later on September 8. Based on ship reports of near gale-force winds far from its center, the depression was upgraded into Tropical Storm Lidia overnight, as it was presumed that stronger winds existed closer to the center.

At the time of the upgrade, Tropical Storm Lidia was moving to the northwest at around 10 mph (16 km/h) and was located about 300 mi (485 km) south-southwest of Salina Cruz. After briefly leveling off in intensity, Lidia resumed intensification later that day. The system developed very deep convection and a well-defined outflow, both signs of an incoming phase of rapid deepening; consequently, Lidia was forecast to reach Category 2 intensity on the Saffir–Simpson hurricane wind scale (SSHWS) within 48 hours, Shortly thereafter, the National Hurricane Center (NHC) upgraded Lidia into a hurricane; the basis of the upgrade being a ship reporting a pressure of 989 mbar (29.2 inHg) on the northeast portion of the circulation. At the time, Lidia was expected to parallel the Mexican Pacific coast before eventually decaying over cooler waters. Late on September 9, an eye became apparent in visible satellite imagery, which prompted the NHC to re-assess the intensity at 105 mph (169 km/h), despite Dvorak classifications suggesting that Lidia was significantly weaker. Six hours later, Lidia obtained major hurricane intensity (Category 3 or higher on the SSHS). It was also around this time in which Lidia's forecast track began to change, with the now expected to threaten the Baja California Peninsula due to an interaction with a cut-off low offshore the peninsula. Continuing to rapidly intensify, Hurricane Lidia reached its peak wind speed of 150 mph (240 km/h) at 12:00 UTC on September 11. At the time of peak intensity, Lidia exhibited a well-defined eye surrounded by very cold cloud top temperatures.

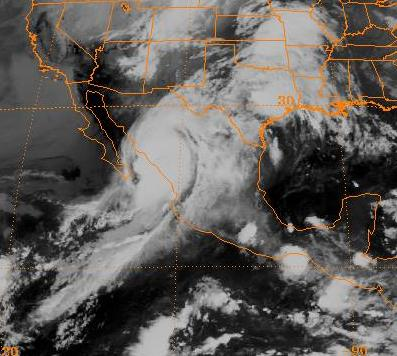
Hurricane Lidia making landfall in Mexico on September 12

Cloud tops near the eye began to warm on the evening of September 11, and despite being located over ocean temperatures of 82 °F (28 °C) ocean temperatures, which typically is favorable for strengthening, Lidia began to lose strength. Because of two troughs, one over the northern Gulf of California and another over the Southwestern United States, Hurricane Lidia also began to recurve northeast on a trajectory towards mainland Mexico. The hurricane had begun to weaken significantly, and 24 hours following its peak, Lidia was only a mid-level Category 2 hurricane. Lidia made landfall near Culiacán in central Sinaloa at 18:00 UTC on September 13 with winds of 100 mph (160 km/h). Shortly after landfall, Hurricane Lidia began to accelerate northeastward. Lidia weakened to a depression just after crossing the U.S.-Mexico border. The depression dissipated near Austin on September 14, although the remnants of the cyclone were absorbed by a cold front.

== Preparations, impact, and aftermath ==
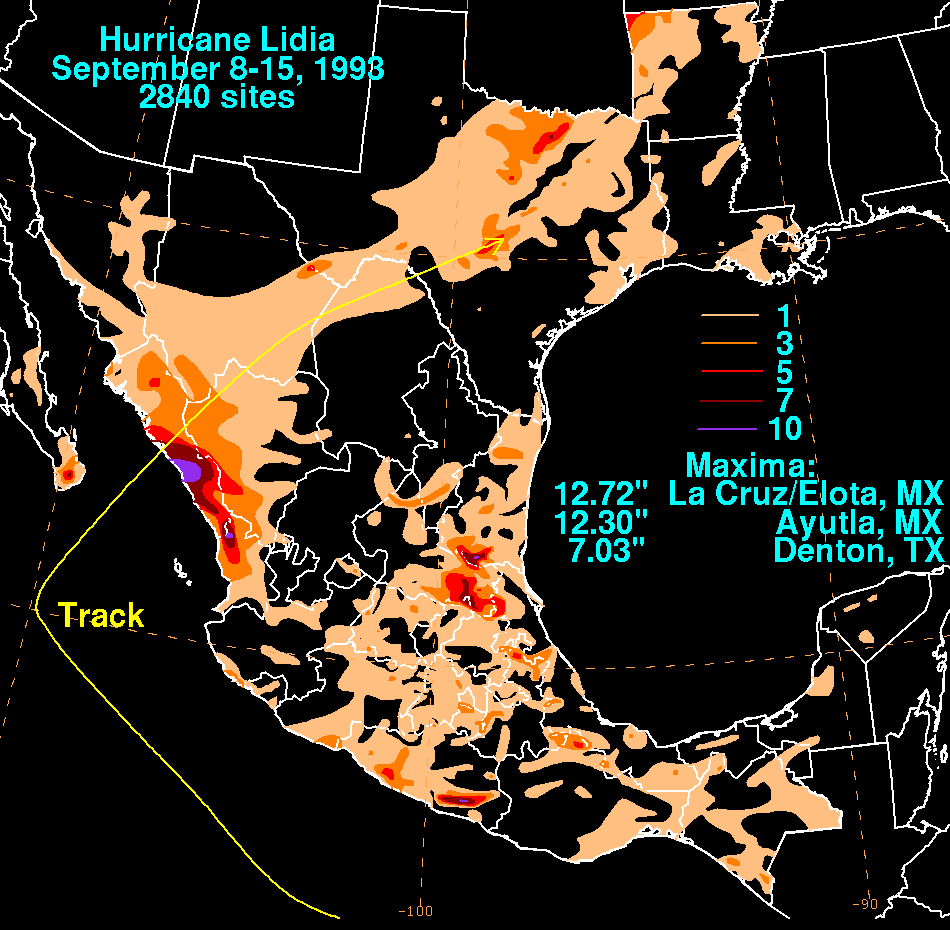
Plot of rainfall totals across Mexico and the Southern United States from Hurricane Lidia

=== Mexico ===
A tropical storm warning was issued from Acapulco to Cabo Corrientes, Jalisco at 2100 UTC September 21, but was discontinued 18 hours later. On 0300 UTC September 12 a hurricane warning was issued for areas below La Paz. Twelve hours later, a tropical storm warning was issued for the remaining portion of Baja California Sur. The same day, a hurricane warning was issued for a large area of the mainland. However, all watches and warnings were discontinued on September 13 as the system had moved inland over Mexico.

Although no reports of tropical storm force winds over land were received by the NHC, it is estimated that near-hurricane-force winds occurred near Mazatlán. The following locations received more than 8 in (200 mm) of rain; 12.72 in (323 mm) fell in La Cruz/Elota, 12.3 inches (310 mm) fell in Ayolta, 8.7 in (220 mm) fell in La Cruz, and 8.3 in (210 mm) was recorded in Digue La Primeva. Seven deaths are fully attributed to the storm and 41 people perished in combination of Tropical Storm Beatriz, Hurricane Gert, and Lidia. In addition, one injury were reported. One person in Sinaloa was electrocuted, and another person died in Durango during the collapse of a dwelling. Three fishing boats were reported missing at sea. More than 10,000 people were homeless, and damage was widespread in both of the states. Hundreds of shanty-homes near Mazatlán were toppled, and 100 houses were destroyed in La Cruz. In Durango, 16 homes were destroyed and 4,000 were damaged. In some areas of Nayarit, flooding destroyed several areas of agriculture. Near Culiacán, 1,200 head of cattle were killed, and a 150-foot (46 m) television tower was blown over. Utility poles, snapped trees and branches, and shredded billboards littered streets. Water, telephone, and electricity were cut off. Due to lack of power, gas stations were unable to pump. Many windows were smashed and widespread power and cell phone service outages were recorded. However, the hurricane avoided the more populated areas of the country, thus greatly reducing damage. About 100,000 people were forced to evacuate their homes. During the aftermath of the storm, army troops provided blankets and food to the homeless.

=== United States ===
The remnants of Lidia, in combination of a cold front, prompted a tornado watch and flash flood watch for much of Texas. In Texas, six tornadoes were reported, with one of them causing over $8 million (1993 USD) in damage. The Dallas–Fort Worth area was hit hard. Strong winds, tornadoes and torrential downpours left broken trees, damaged buildings, and minor injuries in the wake of the storm. Johnson, Denton, Collin, Tarrant, and Dallas counties were the hardest hit. In northern Arlington, five people were injured when a roof was torn off of a hotel.

== See also ==
- Other storms of the same name
- List of Pacific hurricanes
- List of Category 4 Pacific hurricanes
- Hurricane Lane (2006)
- Hurricane Rosa (1994)
- Hurricane Waldo (1985)
