= Timeline of the 2006 Pacific hurricane season =

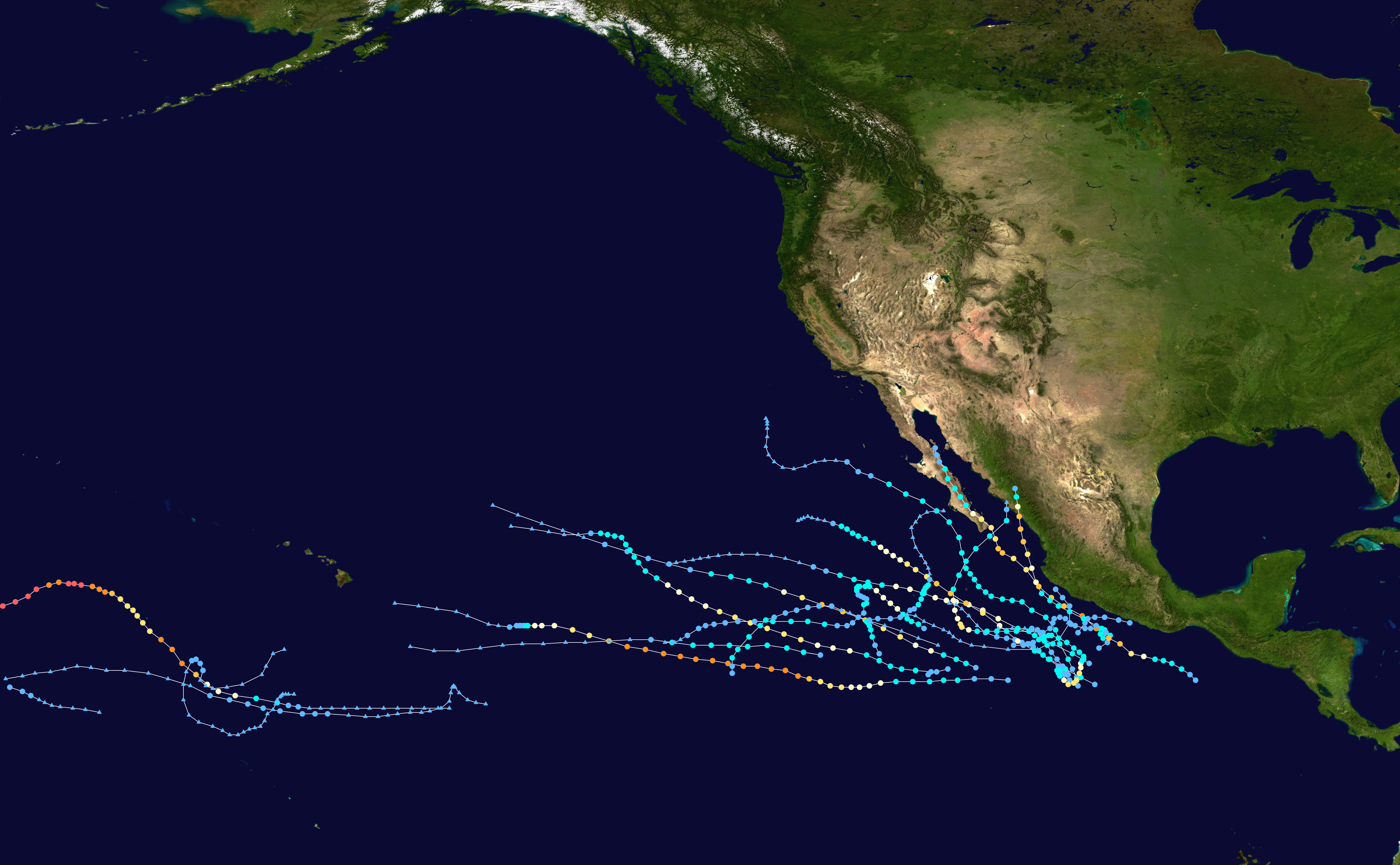
- Season summary map

Season boundaries
- First system formed: May 27, 2006
- Last system dissipated: November 20, 2006

Strongest system
- Name: Ioke
- Maximum winds: 160 mph (260 km/h) (1-minute sustained)
- Lowest pressure: 915 mbar (hPa; 27.02 inHg)

Longest lasting system
- Name: Daniel
- Duration: 10 days
Storm articles
- Tropical Depression Two-E (2006)
- Hurricane Daniel (2006)
- Tropical Storm Emilia (2006)
- Hurricane Ioke
- Hurricane John (2006)
- Hurricane Lane (2006)
- Tropical Storm Norman (2006)
- Hurricane Paul (2006)

The 2006 Pacific hurricane season was the most active since the 2000 season, producing 21 tropical depressions; 19 of which became tropical storms or hurricanes. The season officially started on May 15, 2006, in the eastern Pacific, designated as the area east of 140°W, and on June 1, 2006, in the central Pacific, which is between the International Date Line and 140°W, and lasted until November 30, 2006. These dates typically limit the period of each year when most tropical cyclones form in the eastern Pacific basin. This timeline documents all the storm formations, strengthening, weakening, landfalls, extratropical transitions, as well as dissipation. The timeline also includes information which was not operationally released, meaning that information from post-storm reviews by the National Hurricane Center, such as information on a storm that was not operationally warned on, have been included.

The first storm of the season, Tropical Storm Aletta, formed off the southwest coast of Mexico. After no storms formed in June, the season became active again in July when five named storms developed, including Hurricane Daniel, which was the second strongest storm of the season. Six storms formed during August, including Hurricane Ioke and Hurricane John. September was a relatively inactive month, producing only two storms, of which one was Hurricane Lane. Three storms developed in October and two formed in November; this marked the first time on record when more than one tropical storm developed in the basin during the month of November.

== Timeline of storms ==
=== May ===
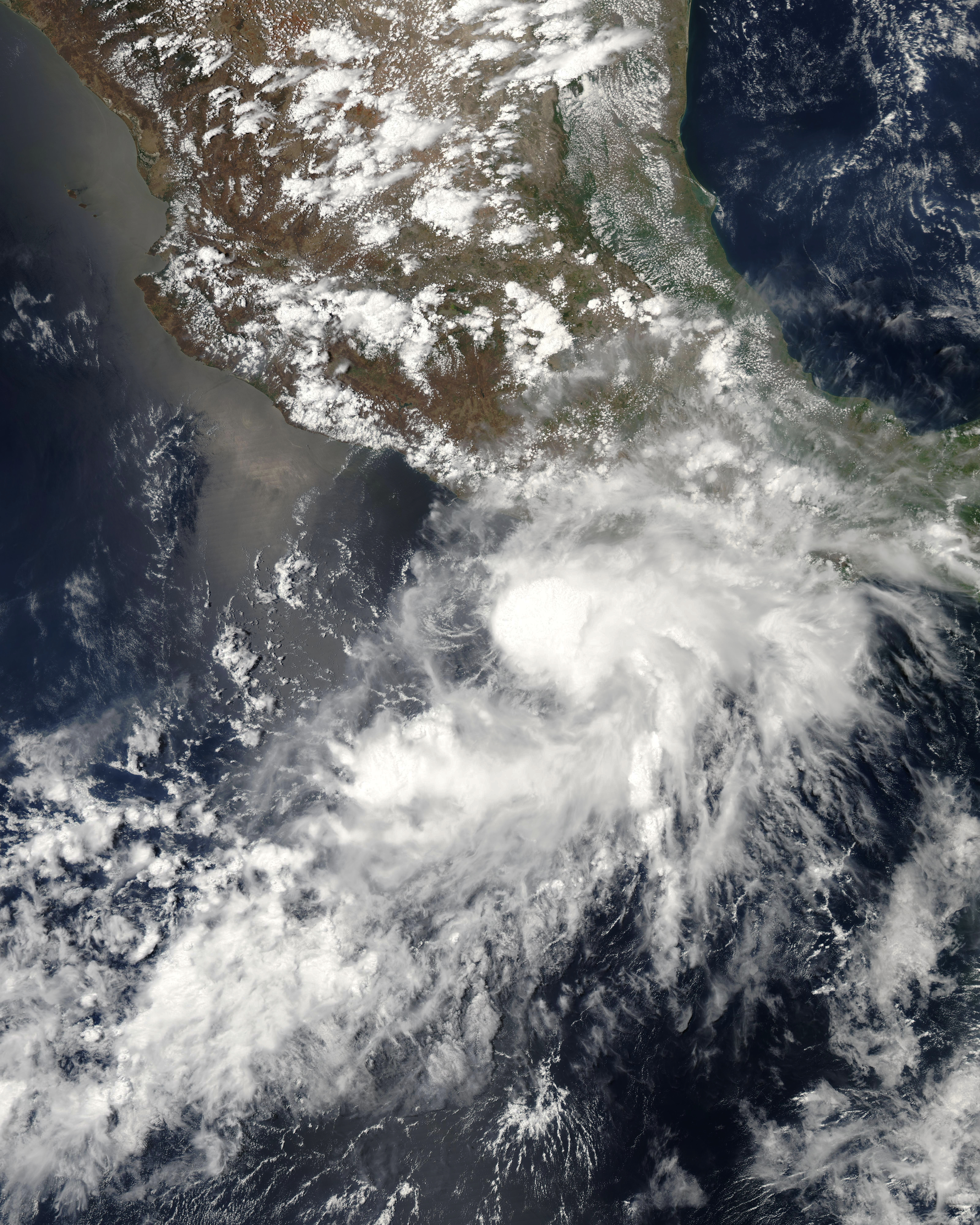
Tropical Storm Aletta

May 15

- The Eastern Pacific hurricane season officially begins.

May 26

- 11:00 a.m. PDT (06:00 UTC May 27) – Tropical Depression One-E forms 190 miles (305 km) southwest of Acapulco, Mexico.
- 11:00 p.m. PDT (18:00 UTC) – Tropical Depression One-E strengthens into Tropical Storm Aletta.

May 29

- 8:00 p.m. PDT (03:00 UTC May 30) – Tropical Storm Aletta is downgraded to a tropical depression.

May 30

- 5:00 p.m. PDT (00:00 UTC May 31) – Tropical Depression Aletta becomes a remnant low.

=== June ===
June 1

- The Central Pacific hurricane season officially begins.

June 3

- 11:00 a.m. PDT (19:00 UTC) – Tropical Depression Two-E forms 145 miles (230 km) southwest of Zihuatanejo, Mexico.

June 4

- 11:00 p.m. PDT (06:00 UTC June 5) – Tropical Depression Two-E dissipates.

=== July ===
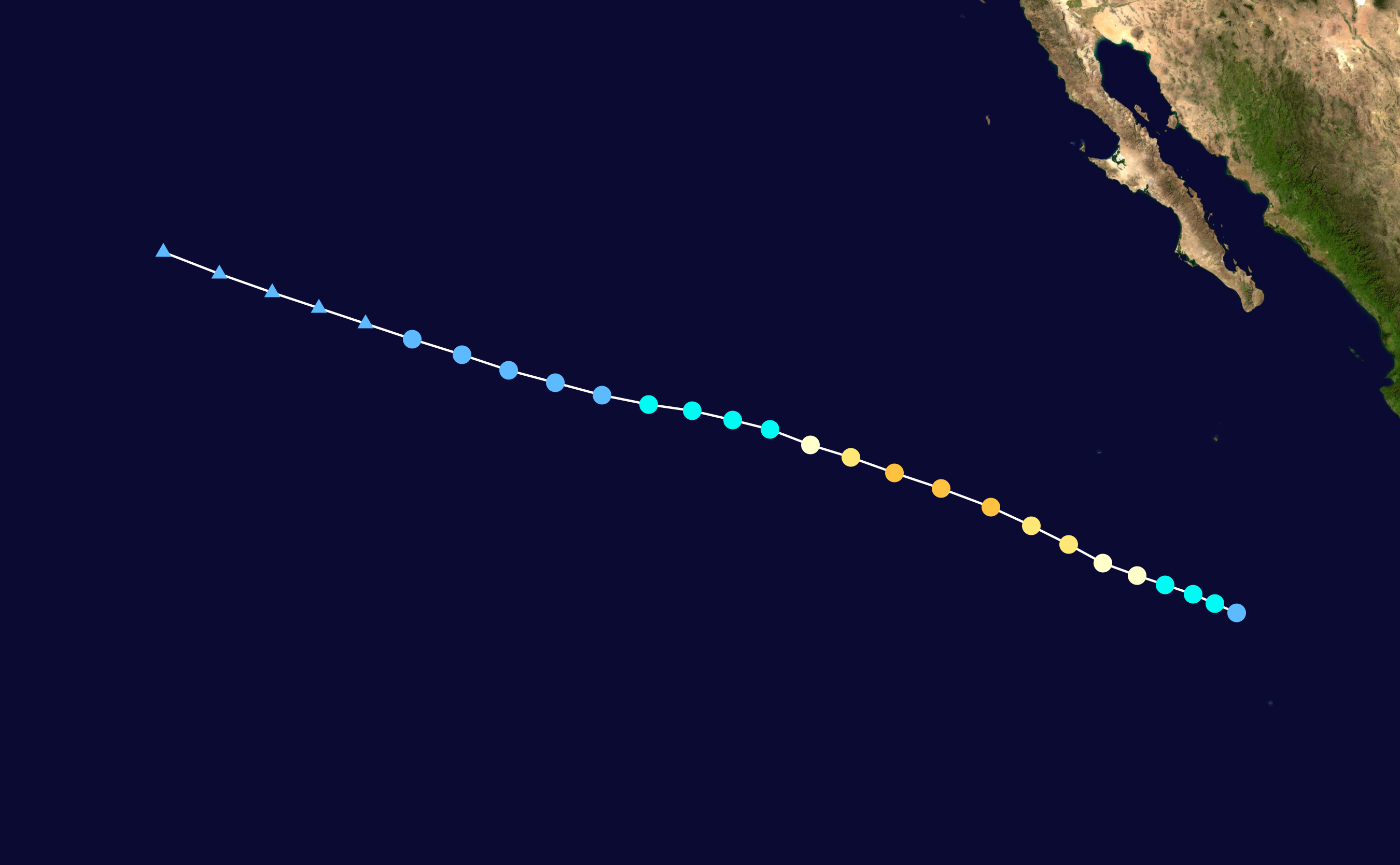
Hurricane Bud track map

July 10

- 5:00 p.m. PDT (00:00 UTC July 11) – Tropical Depression Three-E forms 810 miles (1,295 km) south of Cabo San Lucas, Mexico.
- 11:00 p.m. PDT (06:00 UTC July 11) – Tropical Depression Three-E strengthens into Tropical Storm Bud.

July 11

- 5:00 p.m. PDT (00:00 UTC July 12) – Tropical Storm Bud strengthens into Hurricane Bud.
- 5:00 p.m. PDT (00:00 UTC July 12) – Tropical Depression Four-E forms 290 miles (465 km) south of Zihuatanejo.
- 11:00 p.m. PDT (06:00 UTC July 12) – Tropical Depression Four-E strengthens into Tropical Storm Carlotta.

July 12

- 5:00 a.m. PDT (12:00 UTC) – Hurricane Bud reaches Category 2 intensity.
- 5:00 p.m. PDT (00:00 UTC July 13) – Hurricane Bud reaches Category 3 intensity.
- 11:00 p.m. PDT (06:00 UTC July 13) – Tropical Storm Carlotta strengthens into Hurricane Carlotta.

July 13

- 11:00 p.m. PDT (06:00 UTC July 14) – Hurricane Bud weakens into a tropical storm.

July 14

- 11:00 a.m. PDT (18:00 UTC) – Hurricane Carlotta weakens into a tropical storm.
- 5:00 p.m. PDT (00:00 UTC July 15) – Tropical Storm Carlotta restrengthens into a hurricane.
- 11:00 p.m. PDT (06:00 UTC July 15) – Tropical Storm Bud weakens into a tropical depression.

July 15

- 5:00 a.m. PDT (12:00 UTC) – Hurricane Carlotta weakens into a tropical storm again.

July 16

- 5:00 a.m. PDT (12:00 UTC) – Tropical Depression Bud becomes a remnant low.
- 5:00 a.m. PDT (12:00 UTC) – Tropical Storm Carlotta weakens into a tropical depression.
- 11:00 a.m. PDT (18:00 UTC) – Tropical Depression Five-E forms about 525 miles (845 km) south-southwest of Manzanillo, Mexico.
- 5:00 p.m. PDT (00:00 UTC July 17) – Tropical Depression Carlotta becomes a remnant low.

July 17

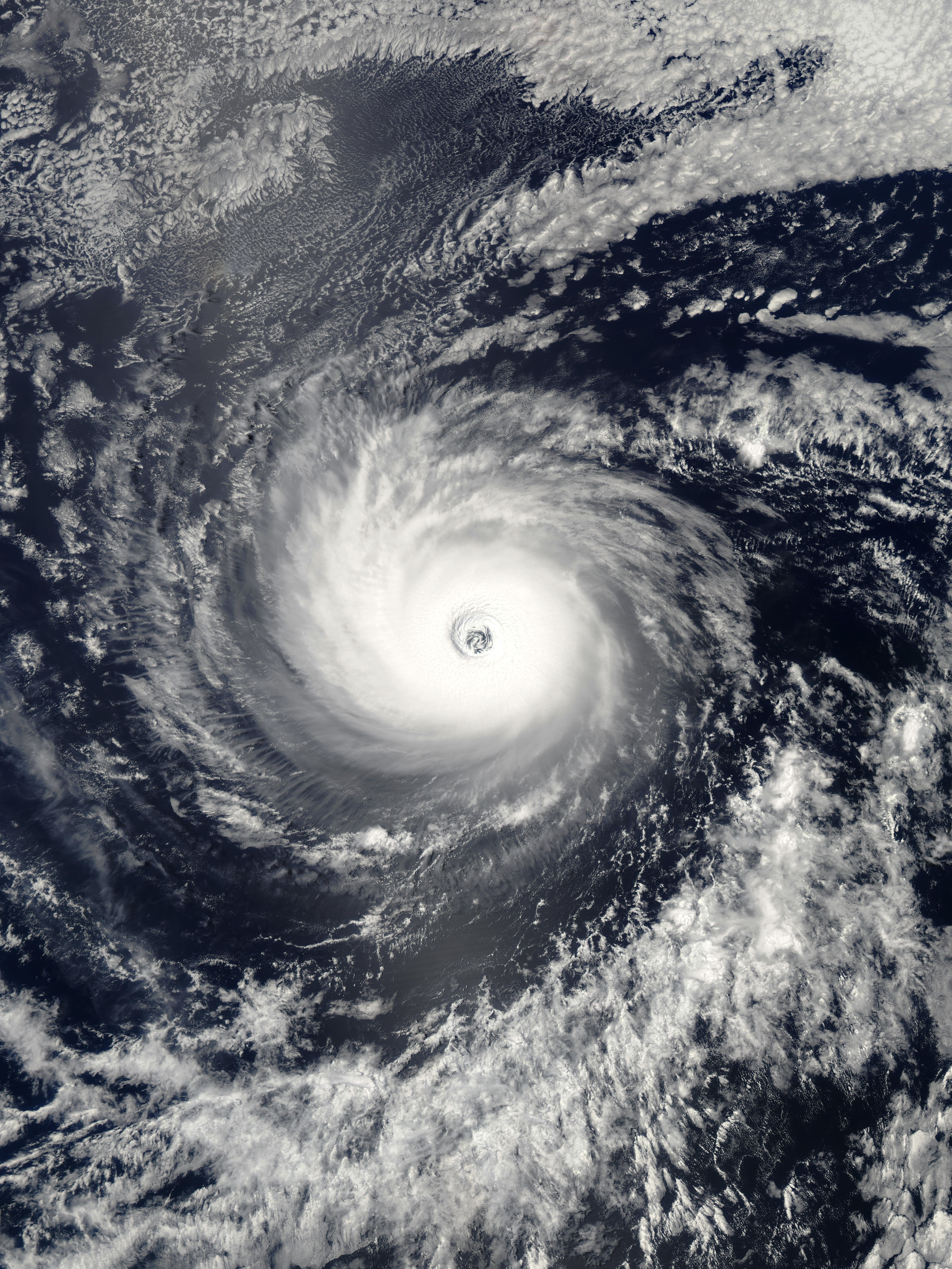
Hurricane Daniel near its peak intensity on July 21

- 5:00 a.m. PDT (12:00 UTC) – Tropical Depression Five-E strengthens into Tropical Storm Daniel.

July 18

- 11:00 a.m. PDT (18:00 UTC) – Tropical Storm Daniel strengthens into Hurricane Daniel.

July 19

- 11:00 a.m. PDT (18:00 UTC) – Hurricane Daniel reaches Category 2 intensity.

July 20

- 5:00 a.m. PDT (12:00 UTC) – Hurricane Daniel reaches Category 3 intensity.
- 11:00 a.m. PDT (18:00 UTC) – Hurricane Daniel reaches Category 4 intensity.

July 21

- 5:00 a.m. PDT (12:00 UTC) – Tropical Depression Six-E forms about 405 miles (650 km) south-southwest of Acapulco.
- 11:00 p.m. PDT (06:00 UTC July 22) – Tropical Depression Six-E strengthens into Tropical Storm Emilia.

July 24

- approximately 2:00 a.m. HST (12:00 UTC) – Hurricane Daniel, while a Category 2 storm, crosses the 140°W boundary and moves into the Central Pacific Hurricane Center's area of responsibility.
- 8:00 p.m. HST (06:00 UTC July 25) – Hurricane Daniel weakens to a tropical storm.

July 25

- 2:00 p.m. HST (00:00 UTC July 26) – Tropical Storm Daniel weakens to a tropical depression.

July 26

- 2:00 p.m. HST (00:00 UTC July 27) – Tropical Depression Daniel becomes a remnant low.

July 27

- 5:00 a.m. PDT (12:00 UTC) – Tropical Storm Emilia weakens to a tropical depression.
- 11:00 p.m. PDT (06:00 UTC July 28) – Tropical Depression Emilia becomes a remnant low.

July 31

- 11:00 a.m. PDT (18:00 UTC) – Tropical Depression Seven-E forms 985 miles (1,575 km) southwest of the southern tip of Baja California.
- 5:00 p.m. PDT (00:00 UTC August 1) – Tropical Depression Seven-E strengthens into Tropical Storm Fabio.
- 5:00 p.m. PDT (00:00 UTC August 1) – Tropical Depression Eight-E forms 415 miles (665 km) southwest of Acapulco, Mexico.

=== August ===
August 1

- 5:00 a.m. PDT (12:00 UTC) – Tropical Depression Eight-E strengthens into Tropical Storm Gilma.
- 11:00 p.m. PDT (06:00 UTC August 2) – Tropical Storm Gilma weakens into a tropical depression.

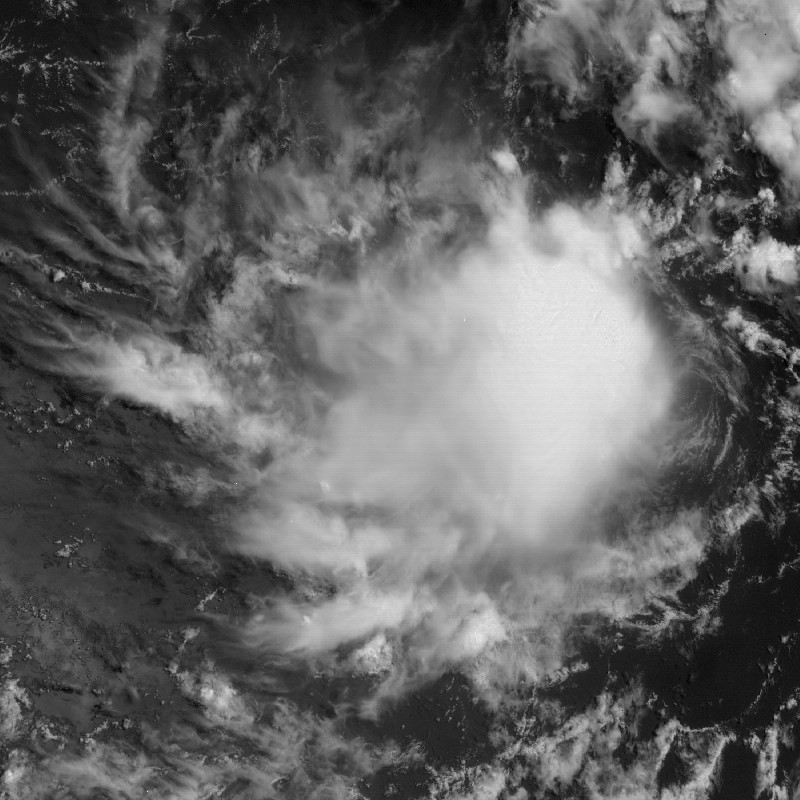
Tropical Storm Gilma on August 1

August 2

- 5:00 p.m. PDT (00:00 UTC August 3) – Tropical Storm Fabio weakens into a tropical depression.

August 3

- 5:00 p.m. PDT (00:00 UTC August 4) – Tropical Depression Fabio becomes a remnant low.
- 5:00 p.m. PDT (00:00 UTC August 4) – Tropical Depression Gilma becomes a remnant low.

August 15

- 11:00 a.m. PDT (18:00 UTC) – Tropical Depression Nine-E forms 750 miles (1,205 km) south-southwest of the southern tip of the Baja California Peninsula.
- 5:00 p.m. PDT (00:00 UTC August 16) – Tropical Depression Nine-E strengthens into Tropical Storm Hector.

August 16

- 11:00 p.m. PDT (06:00 UTC August 17) – Tropical Storm Hector strengthens into Hurricane Hector.

August 17

- 5:00 p.m. PDT (00:00 UTC August 18) – Hurricane Hector reaches Category 2 intensity.

August 19

- 2:00 p.m. HST (00:00 UTC August 20) – Tropical Depression One-C forms 775 miles (1,250 km) south of Honolulu.

August 20

- 2:00 a.m. HST (12:00 UTC) – Tropical Depression One-C strengthens into Tropical Storm Ioke.
- 5:00 a.m. PDT (12:00 UTC) – Hurricane Hector weakens to a tropical storm.
- 2:00 p.m. HST (00:00 UTC August 21) – Tropical Storm Ioke strengthens into Hurricane Ioke.

August 21

- 5:00 a.m. PDT (12:00 UTC) – Tropical Depression Ten-E forms 345 mile (555 km) south-southwest of Acapulco.
- 8:00 a.m. HST (18:00 UTC) – Hurricane Ioke reaches Category 3 intensity.
- 11:00 a.m. PDT (18:00 UTC) – Tropical Depression Ten-E strengthens into Tropical Storm Ileana.
- 2:00 p.m. HST (00:00 UTC August 22) – Hurricane Ioke reaches Category 4 intensity.

August 22

- 11:00 a.m. PDT (18:00 UTC) – Tropical Storm Ileana strengthens into Hurricane Ileana.
- 5:00 p.m. PDT (00:00 UTC August 23) – Tropical Storm Hector weakens to a tropical depression.
- 11:00 p.m. PDT (06:00 UTC August 23) – Tropical Depression Hector weakens into a low-pressure system.
- 11:00 p.m. PDT (06:00 UTC August 23) – Hurricane Ileana reaches Category 2 intensity.

August 23

- 5:00 a.m. PDT (12:00 UTC) – Hurricane Ileana reaches Category 3 intensity.
- 8:00 p.m. HST (06:00 UTC August 24) – Hurricane Ioke regains Category 3 intensity following earlier weakening.

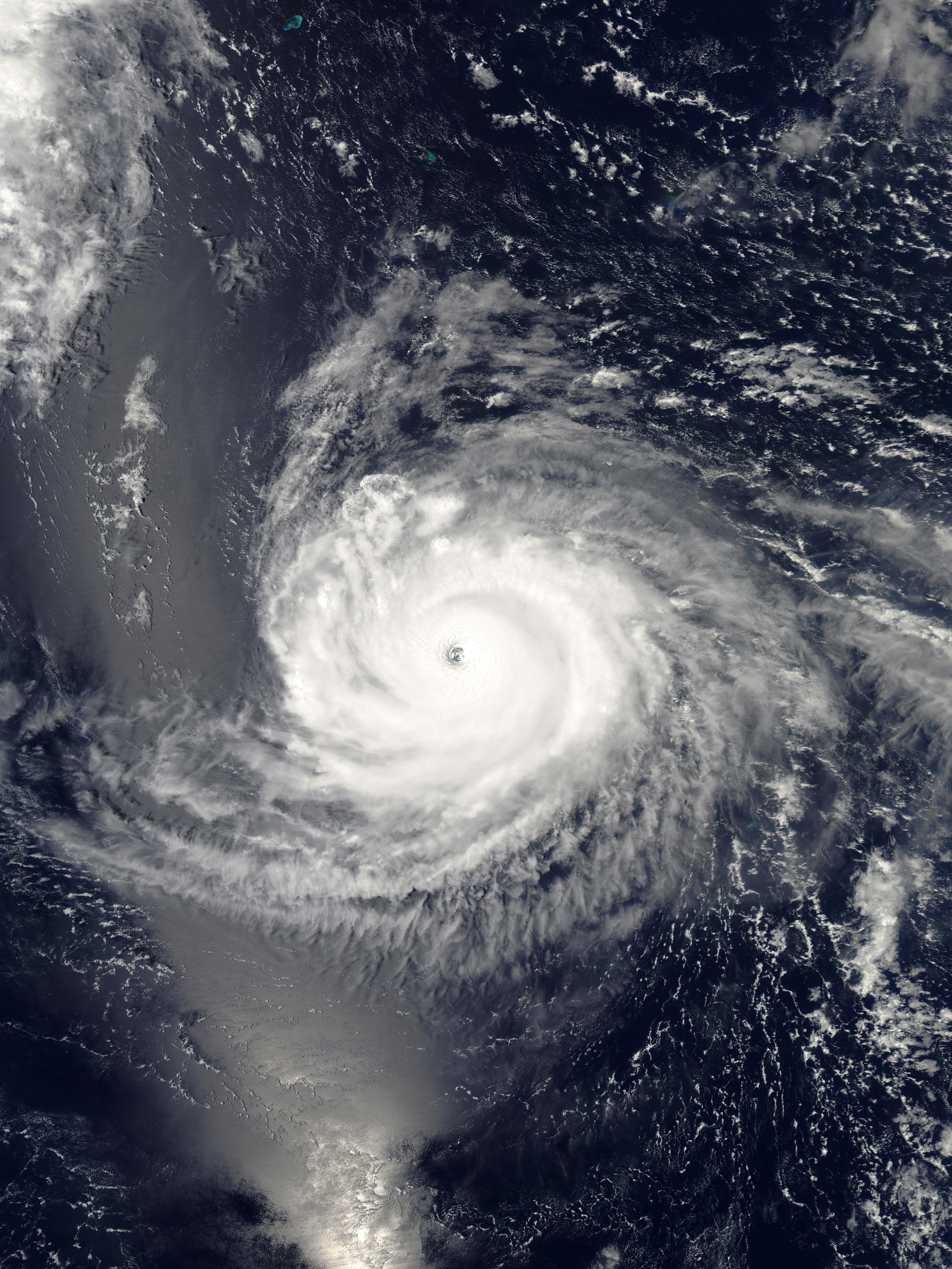
Hurricane Ioke on August 25

August 24

- 2:00 a.m. HST (12:00 UTC) – Hurricane Ioke regains Category 4 intensity.
- 8:00 p.m. HST (06:00 UTC August 25) – Hurricane Ioke reaches Category 5 intensity.

August 25

- 5:00 p.m. PDT (00:00 UTC August 26) – Hurricane Ileana weakens to a tropical storm.

August 26

- 2:00 a.m. HST (12:00 UTC) – Hurricane Ioke regains Category 5 intensity following earlier weakening.
- Approximately 8:00 p.m. HST (06:00 UTC August 27) – Hurricane Ioke, while a Category 5 storm, crosses the International Date Line and out of the area of responsibility of the Central Pacific Hurricane Center.

August 27

- 5:00 a.m. PDT (12:00 UTC) – Tropical Storm Ileana weakens to a tropical depression.
- 11:00 a.m. PDT (18:00 UTC) – Tropical Depression Ileana becomes a remnant low.
- 5:00 p.m. PDT (00:00 UTC August 28) – Tropical Depression Eleven-E forms 270 miles (435 km) south of Salina Cruz, Mexico.

August 28

- 5:00 a.m. PDT (12:00 UTC) – Tropical Depression Eleven-E strengthens into Tropical Storm John.

August 29

- 5:00 a.m. PDT (12:00 UTC) – Tropical Storm John strengthens into Hurricane John.
- 11:00 a.m. PDT (18:00 UTC) – Hurricane John reaches Category 2 intensity.
- 5:00 p.m. PDT (00:00 UTC August 30) – Hurricane John reaches Category 3 intensity.
- 5:00 p.m. PDT (00:00 UTC August 30) – Tropical Depression Twelve-E forms 600 miles (965 km) southwest of the southern tip of the Baja California Peninsula.
- 11:00 p.m. PDT (06:00 UTC August 30) – Tropical Depression Twelve-E strengthens into Tropical Storm Kristy.

August 30

- 5:00 a.m. PDT (12:00 UTC) – Hurricane John reaches Category 4 intensity.
- 11:00 p.m. PDT (06:00 UTC August 31) – Tropical Storm Kristy strengthens into Hurricane Kristy.

August 31

- 11:00 p.m. PDT (06:00 UTC September 1) – Hurricane John regains Category 3 intensity following earlier weakening.
- 11:00 p.m. PDT (06:00 UTC September 1) – Hurricane Kristy weakens to a tropical storm.

=== September ===
September 1

- 7:00 p.m. PDT (02:00 UTC September 2) – Hurricane John makes landfall over Cabo del Este, Baja California Sur with 110 mph (175 km/h) winds. (Note: The figures for maximum sustained winds and position estimates are rounded to the nearest 5 units (knots, miles, or kilometers), following the convention used in the National Hurricane Center's operational products for each storm. All other units are rounded to the nearest digit.)

September 2

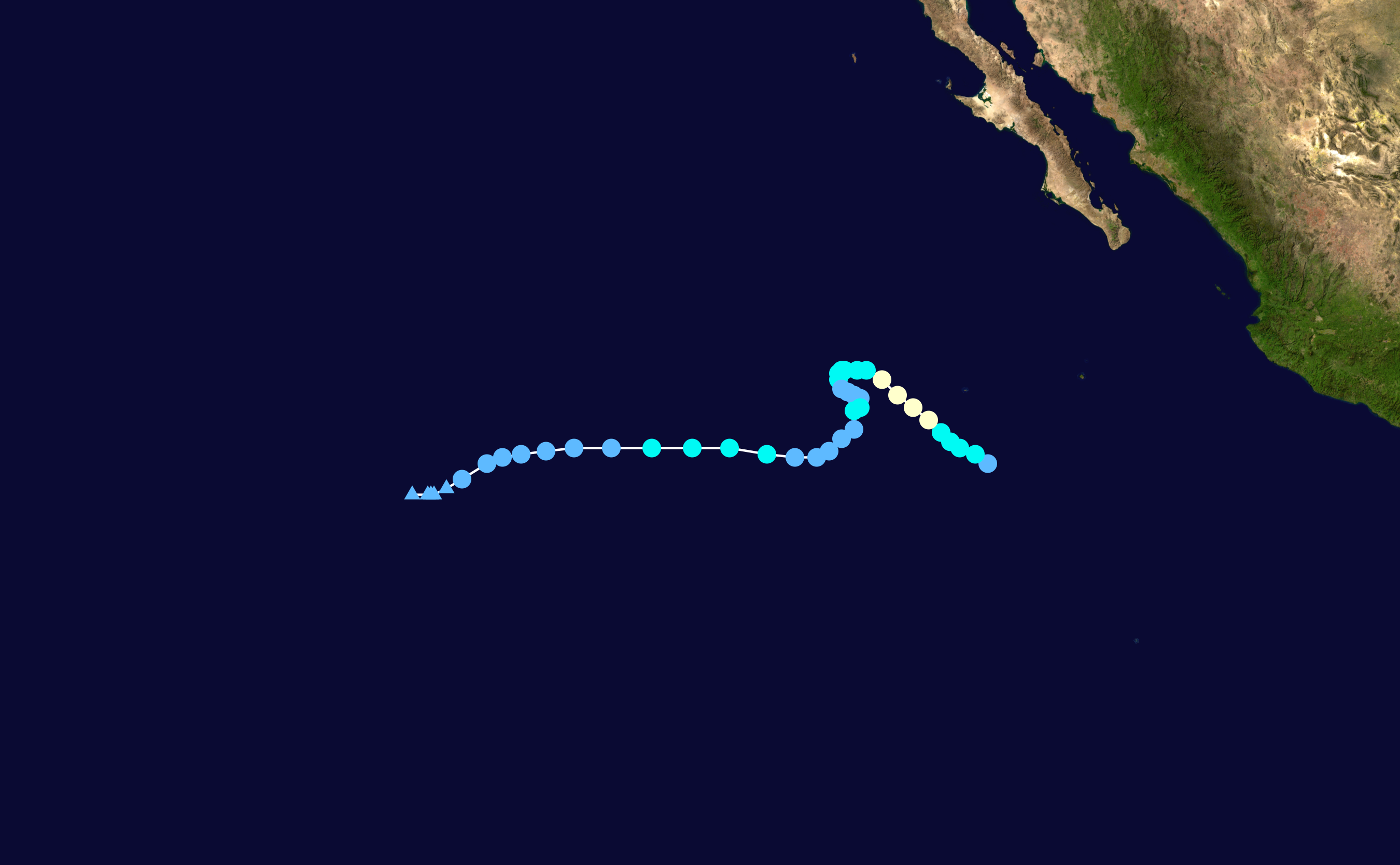
Hurricane Kristy track map

- 11:00 a.m. PDT (18:00 UTC) – Hurricane John weakens to a tropical storm.
- 11:00 a.m. PDT (18:00 UTC) – Tropical Storm Kristy weakens to a tropical depression.

September 3

- 11:00 a.m. PDT (18:00 UTC) – Tropical Depression Kristy restrengthens to a tropical storm.
- 5:00 p.m. PDT (00:00 UTC September 4) – Tropical Storm John weakens to a tropical depression.
- 11:00 p.m. PDT (06:00 UTC September 4) – Tropical Storm Kristy weakens back to a tropical depression.

September 4

- 11:00 a.m. PDT (18:00 UTC) – Tropical Depression John dissipates.

September 5

- 5:00 a.m. PDT (12:0000 UTC) – Tropical Depression Kristy strengthens into a tropical storm for a third time.

September 6

- 5:00 a.m. PDT (12:00 UTC) – Tropical Storm Kristy again weakens to a tropical depression.

September 7

- 11:00 p.m. PDT (06:00 UTC September 8) – Tropical Depression Kristy becomes a remnant low.

September 13

- 11:00 a.m. PDT (18:00 UTC) – Tropical Depression Thirteen-E forms about 115 miles (185 km) southwest of Acapulco, Mexico.
- 11:00 p.m. PDT (06:00 UTC September 14) – Tropical Depression Thirteen-E strengthens into Tropical Storm Lane.

September 15

- 5:00 a.m. PDT (12:00 UTC) – Tropical Storm Lane strengthens into Hurricane Lane.
- 5:00 p.m. PDT (00:00 UTC September 16) – Hurricane Lane reaches Category 2 intensity.
- 5:00 p.m. PDT (00:00 UTC September 16) – Tropical Depression Fourteen-E forms about 510 miles (815 km) southwest of Cabo San Lucas, Mexico.
- 11:00 p.m. PDT (06:00 UTC September 16) – Hurricane Lane reaches Category 3 intensity, becoming the fifth major hurricane of the season.

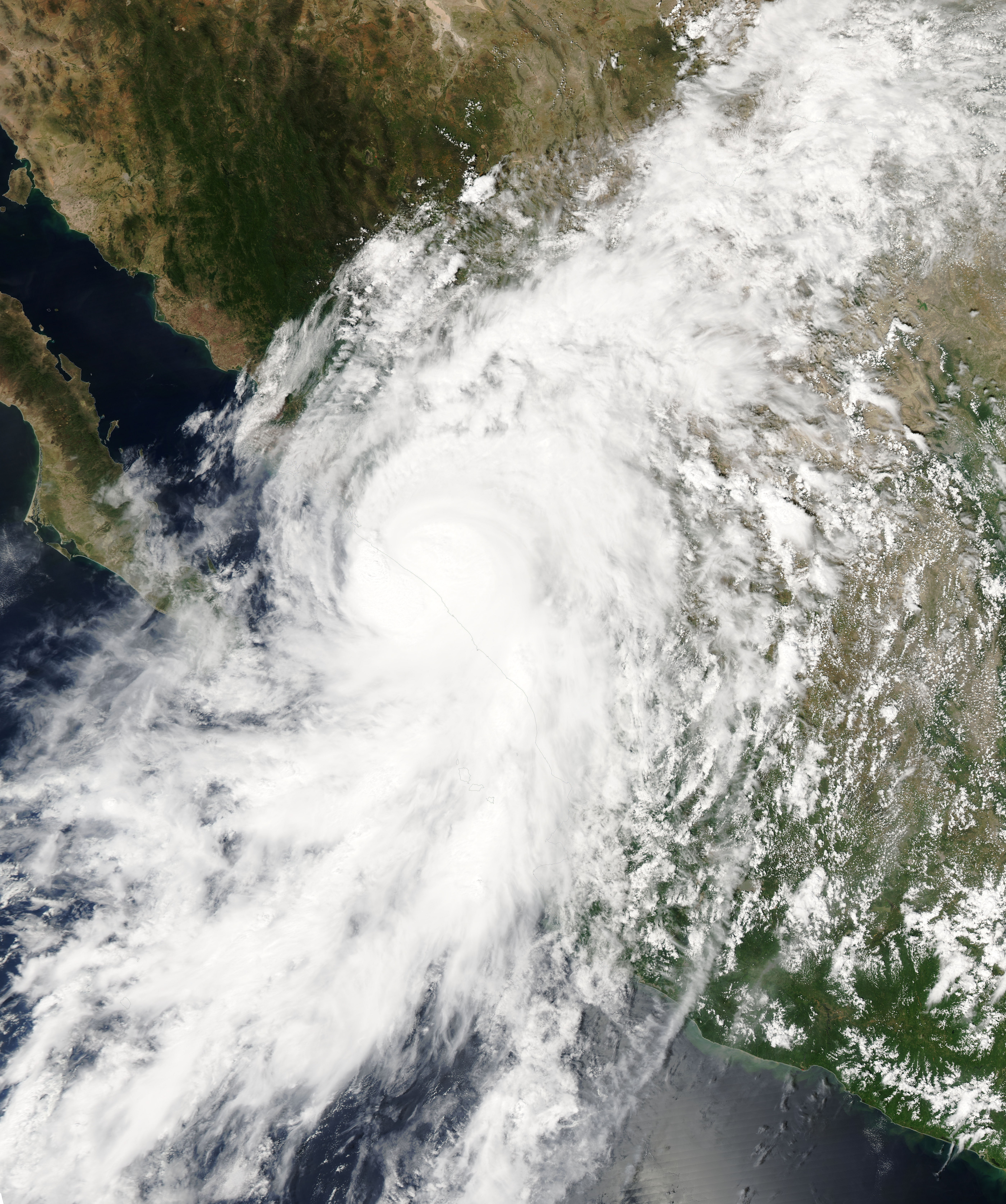
Lane making landfall in Sinaloa

September 16

- 5:00 a.m. PDT (12:00 UTC) – Tropical Depression Fourteen-E strengthens into Tropical Storm Miriam.
- 12:15 p.m. PDT (19:15 UTC) – Hurricane Lane makes landfall on the coast of Sinaloa state along Peninsula de Guevedo, Mexico with 125 mph (205 km/h) winds.
- 11:00 p.m. PDT (06:00 UTC September 17) – Hurricane Lane weakens to a tropical storm.

September 17

- 5:00 a.m. PDT (12:00 UTC) – Tropical Storm Lane weakens to a tropical depression.
- 11:00 a.m. PDT (18:00 UTC) – Tropical Depression Lane dissipates.
- 11:00 p.m. PDT (06:00 UTC September 18) – Tropical Storm Miriam weakens to a tropical depression.

September 18

- 5:00 a.m. PDT (12:00 UTC) – Tropical Depression Miriam weakens into a low.
- 2:00 p.m. HST (00:00 UTC September 19) – Tropical Depression Two-C forms in the Pacific Ocean near 9.8°N 151.5°W.

September 20

- 2:00 p.m. HST (00:00 UTC September 21) – Tropical Depression Two-C degenerates into a tropical disturbance with no low-level circulation center.

September 26

- 8:00 a.m. HST (18:00 UTC) – Tropical Depression Three-C forms 710 miles (1,145 km) west-southwest of Johnston Atoll.
- 8:00 p.m. HST (09:60 UTC September 27) – Tropical Depression Three-C dissipates.

=== October ===
October 8

- 5:00 p.m. PDT (00:00 UTC October 9) – Tropical Depression Fifteen-E forms about 770 miles (1230 km) southwest of Cabo San Lucas.

October 9

- 5:00 a.m. PDT (12:00 UTC) – Tropical Depression Fifteen-E strengthens into Tropical Storm Norman.
- 11:00 a.m. PDT (18:00 UTC) – Tropical Depression Sixteen-E forms 1365 miles (2185 km) west-southwest of the southern tip of Baja California.

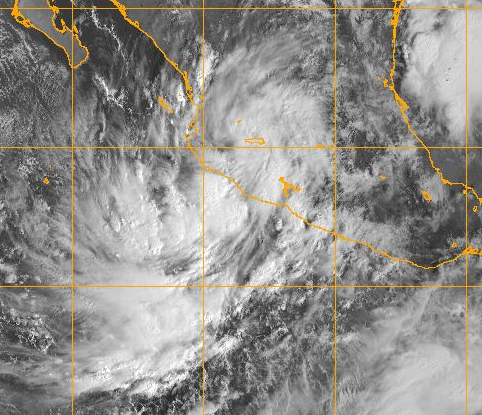
Satellite image of regenerated Norman near the Mexican coast

- 11:00 p.m. PDT (06:00 UTC October 10) – Tropical Depression Sixteen-E strengthens into Tropical Storm Olivia.

October 10

- 11:00 a.m. PDT (18:00 UTC) – Tropical Storm Norman weakens to a tropical depression.

October 11

- 5:00 a.m. PDT (12:00 UTC) – Tropical Storm Olivia weakens to a tropical depression.
- 11:00 a.m. PDT (18:00 UTC) – Tropical Depression Norman weakens into a low.

October 12

- 5:00 p.m. PDT (00:00 UTC October 13) – Tropical Depression Olivia weakens into a low, which is later absorbed by the circulation of Norman.

October 13

- 8:00 a.m. HST (18:00 UTC) – Tropical Depression Four-C forms about 750 miles (1200 km) southwest of Oahu.

October 14

- 8:00 a.m. HST (18:00 UTC) – Tropical Depression Four-C degenerates into a tropical disturbance with low-level cloud swirl.
- 5:00 p.m. PDT (00:00 UTC October 15) – Tropical Depression Norman regenerates 205 miles (325 km) south-southeast of Manzanillo, Mexico.

October 15

- 5:00 p.m. PDT (00:00 UTC October 16) – Tropical Depression Norman dissipates.

October 20

- 11:00 p.m. PDT (06:00 UTC October 21) – Tropical Depression Seventeen-E forms about 265 miles (465 km) south-southwest of Manzanillo, Mexico.

October 21

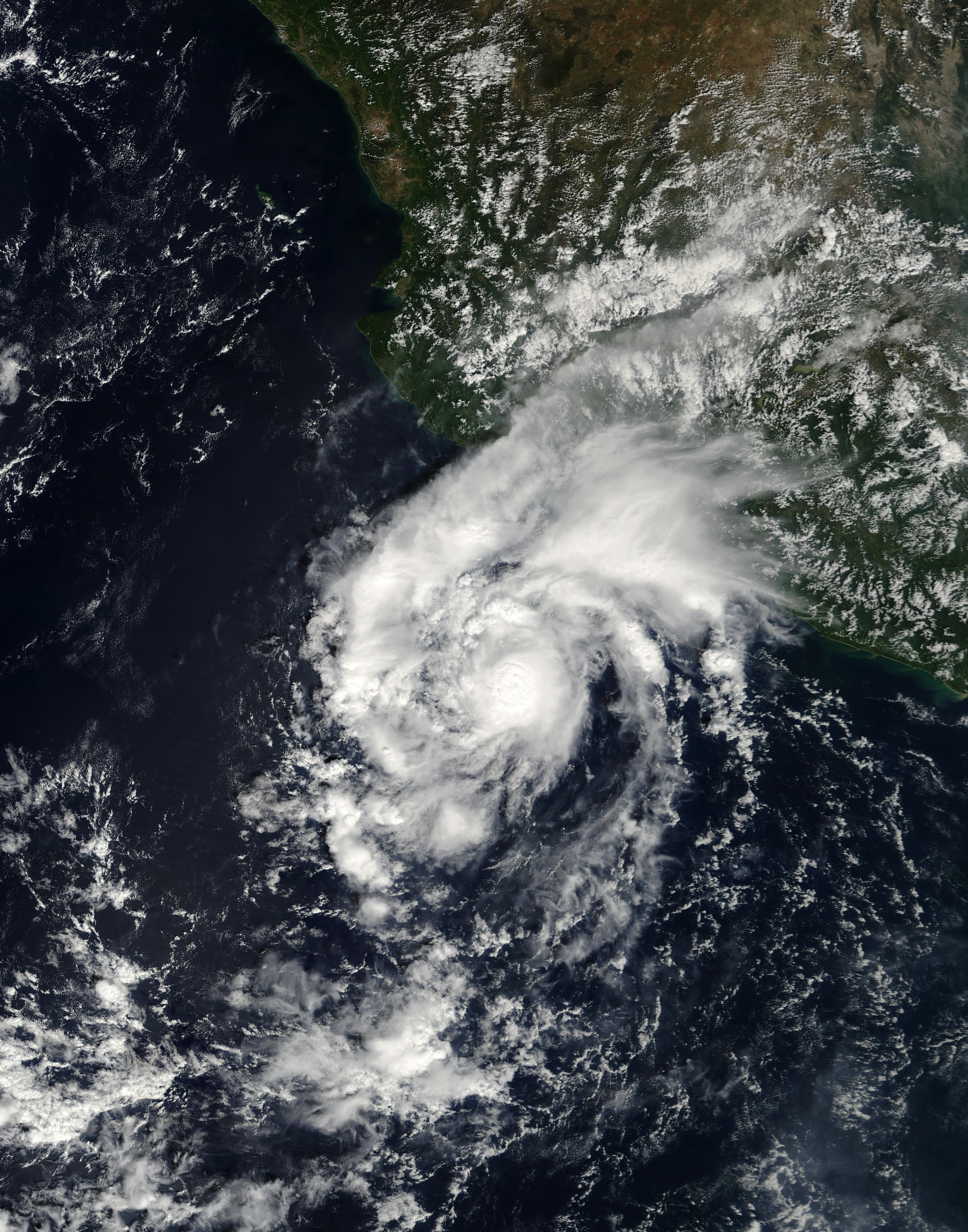
Tropical Depression Seventeen-E

- 5:00 a.m. PDT (12:00 UTC) – Tropical Depression Seventeen-E strengthens into Tropical Storm Paul.

October 22

- 5:00 p.m. PDT (00:00 UTC October 23) – Tropical Storm Paul strengthens into Hurricane Paul.
- 6:00 p.m. PDT (06:00 UTC October 23) – Hurricane Paul reaches Category 2 intensity.

October 24

- 5:00 a.m. PDT (12:00 UTC) – Hurricane Paul weakens to a tropical storm.

October 25

- 5:00 p.m. PDT (00:00 UTC October 26) – Tropical Storm Paul weakens to a tropical depression.
- 9:00 p.m. PDT (04:00 UTC October 26) – Tropical Depression Paul makes landfall near the southern end of Isla Altamura with 30 mph (45 km/h) winds.
- 11:00 p.m. PDT (06:00 UTC October 26) – Tropical Depression Paul becomes a remnant low.

October 26

- 5:00 a.m. PDT (12:00 UTC) – Tropical Depression Eighteen-E forms 155 miles (250 km) south of Manzanillo, Mexico.

October 27

- 5:00 p.m. PDT (00:00 UTC October 28) – Tropical Depression Eighteen-E becomes a remnant low.

=== November ===
November 7

- 10:00 p.m. PST (06:00 UTC November 8) – Tropical Depression Nineteen-E forms 445 miles (715 km) south of Manzanillo, Mexico.

November 8

- 10:00 p.m. PST (06:00 UTC November 9) – Tropical Depression Nineteen-E strengthens into Tropical Storm Rosa.

November 9

- 4:00 p.m. PST (00:00 UTC November 10) – Tropical Storm Rosa weakens to a tropical depression.

November 10

- 4:00 p.m. PST (00:00 UTC November 11) – Tropical Depression Rosa dissipates.
- 4:00 p.m. PST (00:00 UTC November 11) – Tropical Depression Twenty-E forms 655 miles (1,045 km) southwest of Manzanillo.

November 11

- 10:00 a.m. PST (18:00 UTC) – Tropical Depression Twenty-E dissipates.

November 13

- 10:00 a.m. PST (18:00 UTC) – Tropical Depression Twenty-one-E forms about 465 miles (740 km) south of Manzanillo.

November 14

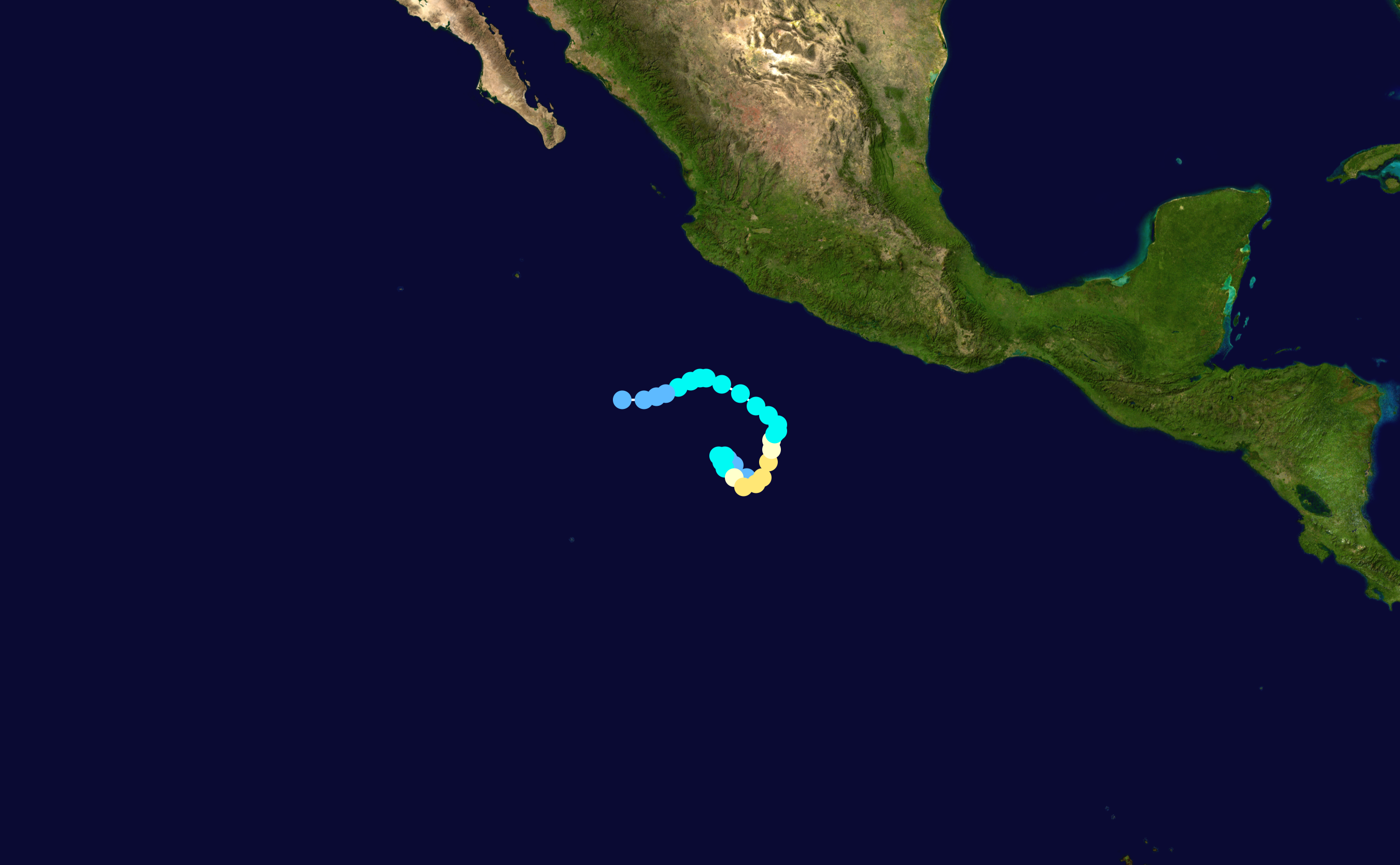
Hurricane Sergio track map

- 4:00 a.m. PST (12:00 UTC) – Tropical Depression Twenty-one-E strengthens into Tropical Storm Sergio.

November 15

- 4:00 a.m. PST (12:00 UTC) – Tropical Storm Sergio strengthens into Hurricane Sergio.
- 10:00 a.m. PST (18:00 UTC) – Hurricane Sergio reaches to Category 2 intensity.

November 16

- 10:00 p.m. PST (06:00 UTC November 17) – Hurricane Sergio weakens to a tropical storm.

November 19

- 4:00 p.m. PST (00:00 UTC November 20) – Tropical Storm Sergio weakens to a tropical depression.

November 20

- 4:00 p.m. PST (00:00 UTC November 21) – Tropical Depression Sergio dissipates.

November 30

- The Eastern and Central Pacific hurricane seasons both officially end.

== See also ==
- Pacific hurricane season
- Timeline of the 2006 Atlantic hurricane season
- Timeline of the 2006 Pacific typhoon season
