= Hurricane Paul (2006) =

Category 2 Pacific hurricane in 2006

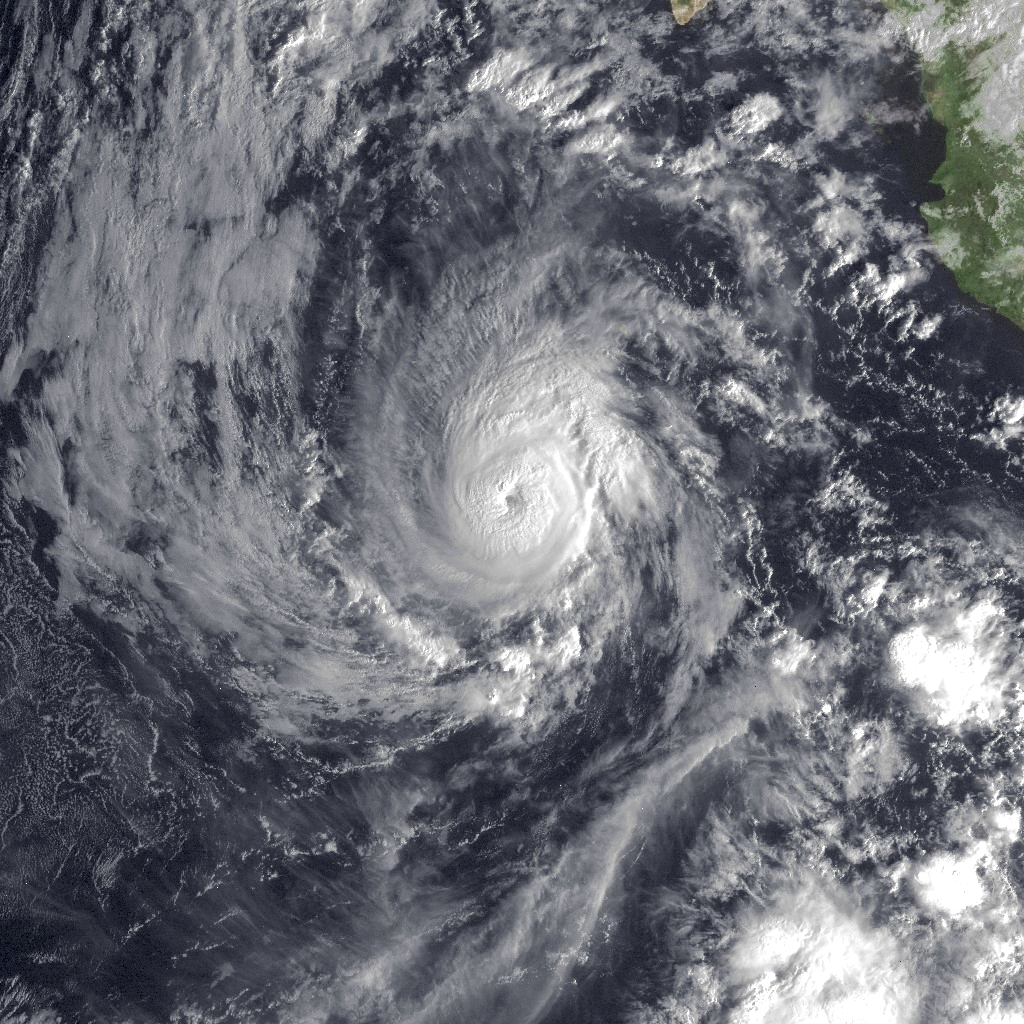
- Hurricane Paul at peak intensity on October 23

Meteorological history
- Formed: October 21, 2006
- Dissipated: October 26, 2006

Category 2 hurricane
- 1-minute sustained (SSHWS/NWS)
- Highest winds: 105 mph (165 km/h)
- Lowest pressure: 970 mbar (hPa); 28.64 inHg

Overall effects
- Fatalities: 4 direct
- Damage: $3.2 million (2006 USD)
- Areas affected: Oaxaca, Guerrero, Baja California Sur, Sinaloa
- IBTrACS
- Part of the 2006 Pacific hurricane season

Hurricane Paul was a Category 2 Pacific hurricane that struck Mexico as a tropical depression in October 2006. The seventeenth named storm and tenth hurricane of the annual hurricane season, Paul developed from an area of disturbed weather on October 21. The cyclone slowly intensified as it moved into an area of warm waters and progressively decreasing wind shear. Paul attained hurricane status on October 23, and later that day the storm reached its peak intensity with maximum sustained winds of 105 mph (169 km/h), a strong Category 2 hurricane on the Saffir-Simpson scale. A strong trough turned the hurricane to the north and northeast into an area of strong vertical shear, and Paul weakened to a tropical storm on October 24. It accelerated northeastward, and after passing a short distance south of Baja California Sur the low level circulation became decoupled from the rest of the convection. Paul weakened to a tropical depression on October 25 a short distance off the coast of Mexico, and after briefly turning away from the coast it made landfall on northwestern Sinaloa on October 26. The depression dissipated shortly thereafter.

Paul was the third hurricane to threaten western Mexico during the season, the others being hurricanes John and Lane. Rough surf killed two people along Baja California Sur, while flooding was reported in Sinaloa. Damage totaled more than $35 million (2006 MXN, $3.2 million 2006 USD) across Mexico.

== Meteorological history ==
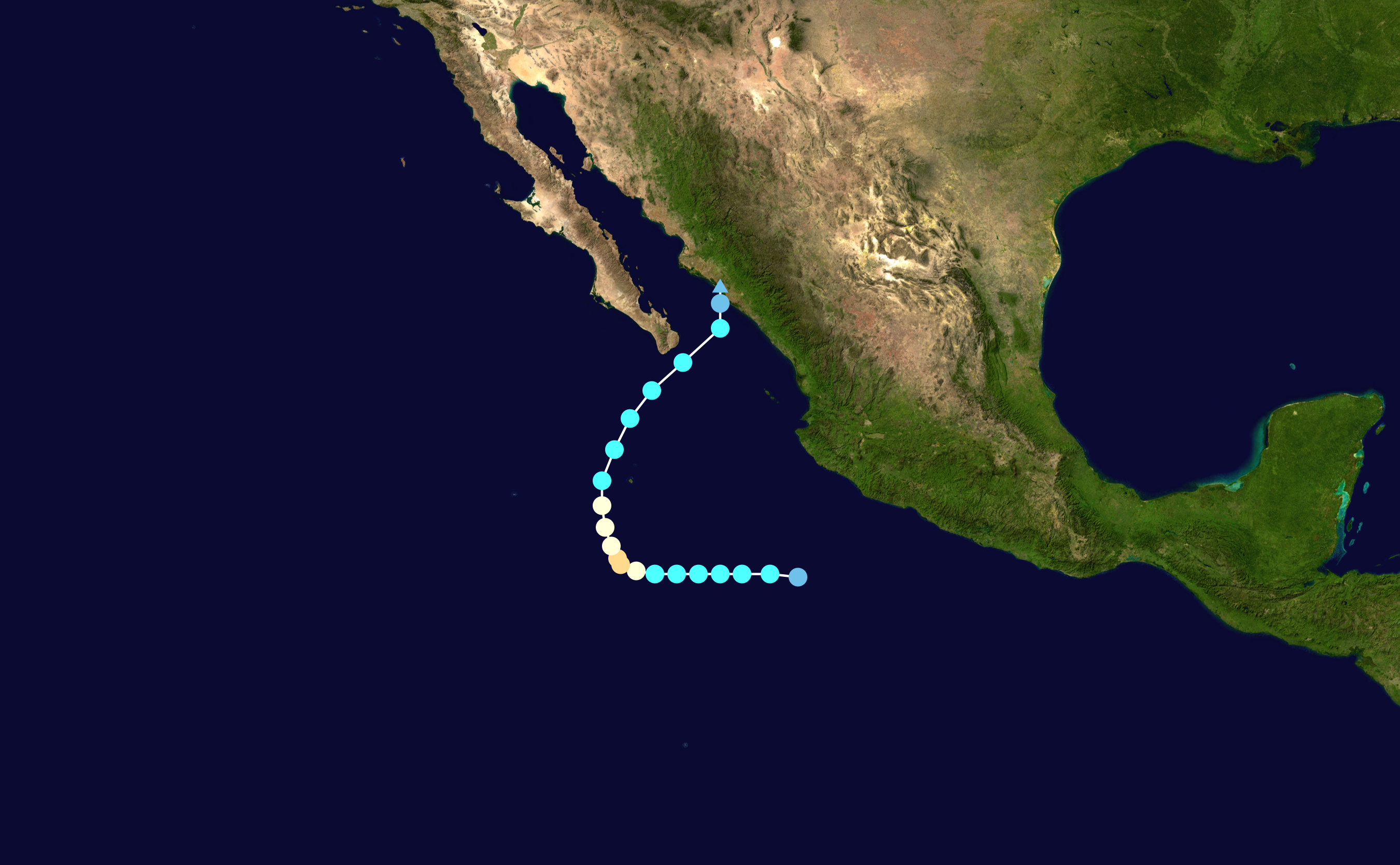
Map plotting the storm's track and intensity, according to the Saffir–Simpson scale Map key Saffir–Simpson scale Tropical depression (≤38 mph, ≤62 km/h) Tropical storm (39–73 mph, 63–118 km/h) Category 1 (74–95 mph, 119–153 km/h) Category 2 (96–110 mph, 154–177 km/h) Category 3 (111–129 mph, 178–208 km/h) Category 4 (130–156 mph, 209–251 km/h) Category 5 (≥157 mph, ≥252 km/h) Unknown Storm type Tropical cyclone Subtropical cyclone Extratropical cyclone, remnant low, tropical disturbance, or monsoon depression

A tropical wave moved off the coast of Africa on October 4. It moved westward across the Atlantic Ocean without development, and entered the eastern Pacific Ocean on October 18. The next day, it combined with a previously existing area of disturbed weather, resulting in a large area of convection extending northward into southern Mexico. The broad and disorganized system moved westward at 10–15 mph (16–24 km/h). On October 20, the system developed an area of low pressure, and began to show signs of organization. It continued to organize, and developed into Tropical Depression Seventeen-E on October 21 while located about 265 miles (426 km) south-southwest of Manzanillo. Upon forming, the depression possessed a small, tight low-level circulation beneath a well-defined mid-level circulation. Easterly wind shear initially restricted upper-level outflow as the cyclone moved to the west, a motion due to a subtropical ridge to its north.

The cloud pattern of the depression quickly became better organized as a curved band developed around intensifying deep convection, and it is estimated the system intensified into Tropical Storm Paul just six hours after forming. Easterly wind shear exposed the low level circulation to the east of the area of deep convection, though Paul continued to intensify as it moved through an area of warm waters and progressively weakening wind shear. The low level circulation gradually became more embedded within the convection as the cloud pattern improved. Computer models had troubles in forecasting the future of the storm early in its life; the GFDL model forecast Paul to reach winds of 119 mph (192 km/h), while global models expected the system to dissipate in 48–72 hours. Early on October 22, wind shear began to decrease, which coincided with an increase of outflow on its eastern side. The storm temporarily degraded in appearance as it turned to the northwest. However, shear sharply abated over Paul late on October 22, resulting in the storm quickly gaining organization and intensifying. An eye began to develop within the convection, and Paul intensified into a hurricane early on October 23.

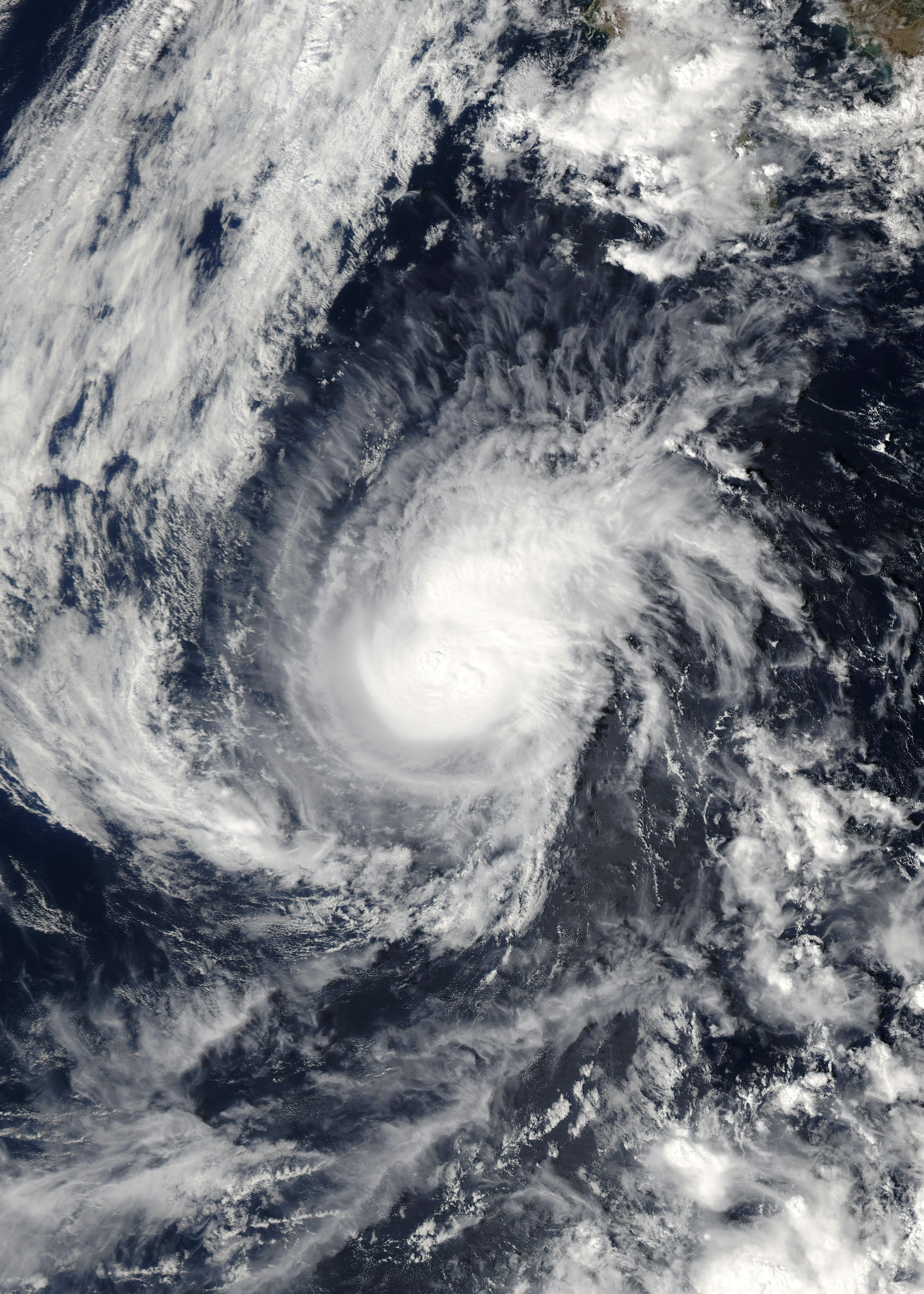
Hurricane Paul shortly after peak intensity

Located in an area of warm water temperatures and light wind shear, Hurricane Paul continued to intensify and organize; its well-defined eye was surrounded by a ring of deep convection while outflow remained strong to the north and south. On October 23, while located 465 miles (748 km) south-southwest of Cabo San Lucas, Paul reached its peak intensity of 105 mph (169 km/h), a Category 2 hurricane on the Saffir-Simpson Scale. A large trough located off the west coast of California turned the hurricane to the north-northwest, and later to the north. The combination of increasing shear and dry air quickly weakened Paul to a tropical storm on October 24 as its low-level circulation became detached from the diminishing convection. The storm then turned to the northeast after passing near Socorro Island. Despite increasing wind shear of over 50 mph (80 km/h), Paul remained a tropical storm while its circulation remained on the southwest side of its developing deep convection. Early on October 25, the storm passed about 100 miles (160 km) south of the southern tip of Baja California. The circulation briefly became involved with the deep convection as it accelerated northeastward, though as it approached the coast of Sinaloa, the center again decoupled from the upper-level circulation. Later that day, Paul weakened to a tropical depression a short distance off the coast of Mexico, and turned to the north. Early the next day, the depression, devoid of any deep convection, made landfall near Isla Altamura in northwestern Sinaloa. Hours later, the National Hurricane Center issued the last advisory on the dissipating tropical depression.

== Preparations ==
As Paul became a hurricane, the government of Mexico issued a hurricane watch for Baja California Sur from Agua Blanca on the west coast to La Paz on the east coast. When a weakening trend was evident as the storm turned to the northeast, the hurricane watch was replaced with a tropical storm warning. 45 hours before the storm struck land, the government of Mexico issued a tropical storm watch from Mazatlán to San Evaristo along the coast of Sinaloa. When Paul was expected to weaken to a tropical depression before landfall, the tropical storm watch for mainland Mexico was discontinued. When Paul retained tropical storm status for longer than expected, and was now expected to make landfall as a tropical storm, a tropical storm warning was issued from Mazatlán to Altata, which was later discontinued as Paul weakened to a tropical depression.

Emergency officials near the southern tip of Baja California closed schools, while rescue workers ordered for the evacuation of more than 1,500 people from shanty towns. Local police officers went door-to-door to inform the potentially affected residents. Buses carried the evacuated citizens to schools temporarily set up as shelters. A hotel in Cabo San Lucas informed its guests of the approaching storm, and organized indoor activities for those that stayed. Several tourists ended their vacations early and left through local airports. The threat of the storm closed the port at Cabo San Lucas, causing delays in a local fishing competition. In Sinaloa, authorities evacuated over 5,000 families in risk of flooding.

== Impact ==
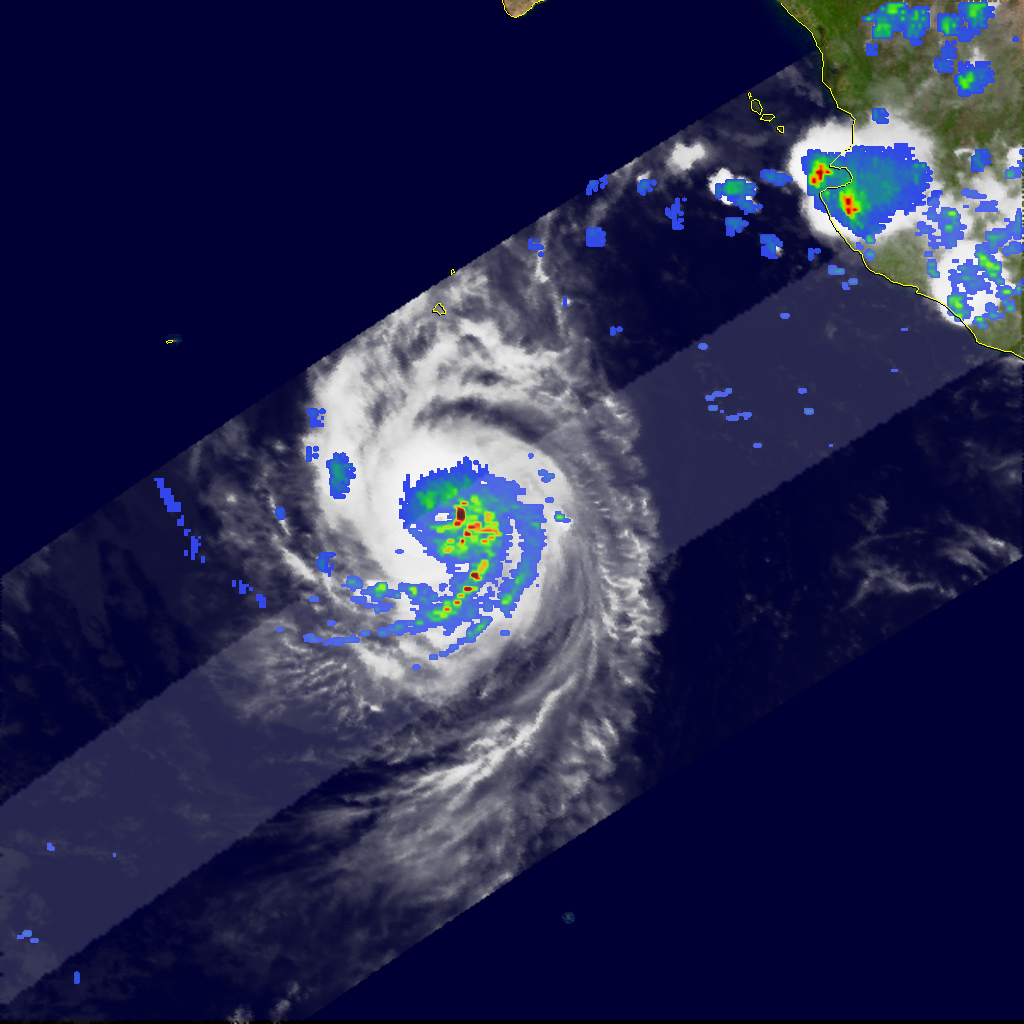
TRMM satellite image of the rainfall from Hurricane Paul

The National Hurricane Center noted that the precursor disturbance had the potential to drop heavy rainfall which could result in life-threatening flash flooding or mudslides in Oaxaca and Guerrero.

In southern Baja California, a fisherman slipped off rocks due to strong seas, while an American tourist was swept out to sea due to rough surf; both were killed. Two others were killed in Sinaloa when their truck was swept away by a swollen river. Paul was the third hurricane in the year to threaten Los Cabos, the others being John and Lane. The hurricane caused little damage in the area, only producing gusty winds and some rainfall. Paul dropped moderate rainfall across mainland Mexico, including a 24-hour total of 2.3 inches (58 mm) in Mazatlán, Sinaloa and over 8 inches (200 mm) in isolated locations. The rainfall led to flooding, the worst of which occurred in Villa Juarez. There, a canal overflowed, while the rainfall flooded streets with up to 3.3 feet (1.0 m) of water. 5,000 houses were damaged from the flooding, displacing 20,000 people. The storm damaged more than 3,700 acres (15 km^{2}) of crop lands, primarily beans and corn. Damage totaled more than $35 million (2006 MXN, $3.2 million 2006 USD).

== See also ==
- Other storms of the same name
- Hurricane Sandra (2015)
