= Tropical Storm Emilia (2006) =

Pacific tropical storm in 2006

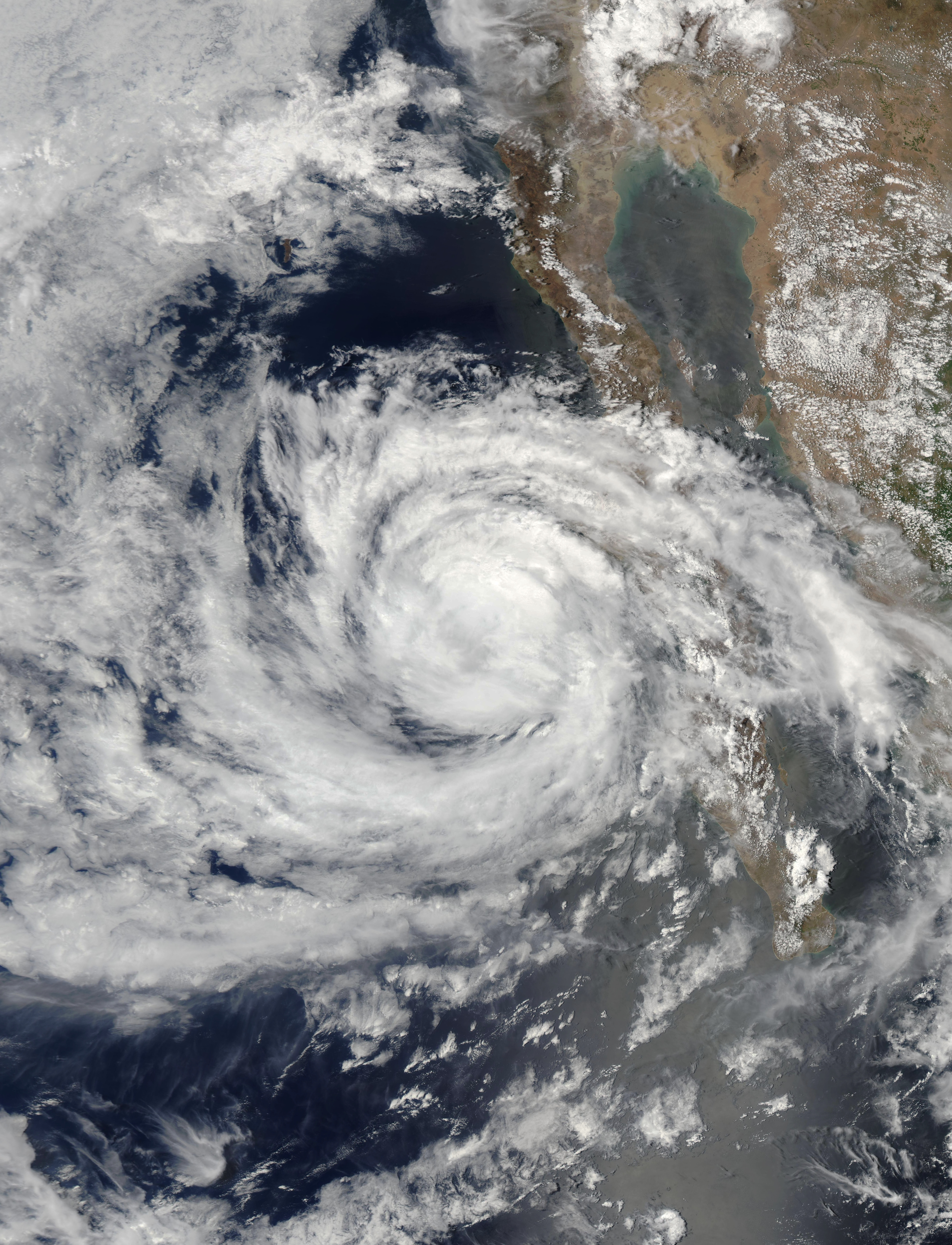
- Tropical Storm Emilia shortly after peak intensity on July 26

Meteorological history
- Formed: July 21, 2006
- Dissipated: July 28, 2006

Tropical storm
- 1-minute sustained (SSHWS/NWS)
- Highest winds: 65 mph (100 km/h)
- Lowest pressure: 990 mbar (hPa); 29.23 inHg

Overall effects
- Fatalities: None
- Damage: Minimal
- Areas affected: Southwestern Mexico, Western Mexico, Baja California Peninsula, Southwestern United States
- IBTrACS /
- Part of the 2006 Pacific hurricane season

Tropical Storm Emilia was a rare tropical cyclone that affected the Baja California Peninsula in July 2006. The sixth tropical depression and fifth tropical storm of the 2006 Pacific hurricane season, it developed on July 21 about 400 miles (640 km) off the coast of Mexico. It moved northward toward the coast, reaching peak winds of 65 mph (105 km/h) before turning westward and encountering unfavorable conditions. Emilia later turned to the north, passing near Baja California as a strong tropical storm. Subsequently, the storm moved further away from the coast, and on July 27 it dissipated.

The storm brought tropical storm force winds and precipitation to the southwestern Mexican coastline. Later, Emilia produced similar conditions in the southern portion of the Baja California peninsula, where its passage caused minor damage and flooding. Moisture from Emilia reached the southwestern United States, producing thunderstorms and flash flooding in Arizona, as well as beneficial rainfall in southern California. No deaths were reported in association with Emilia.

== Meteorological history ==
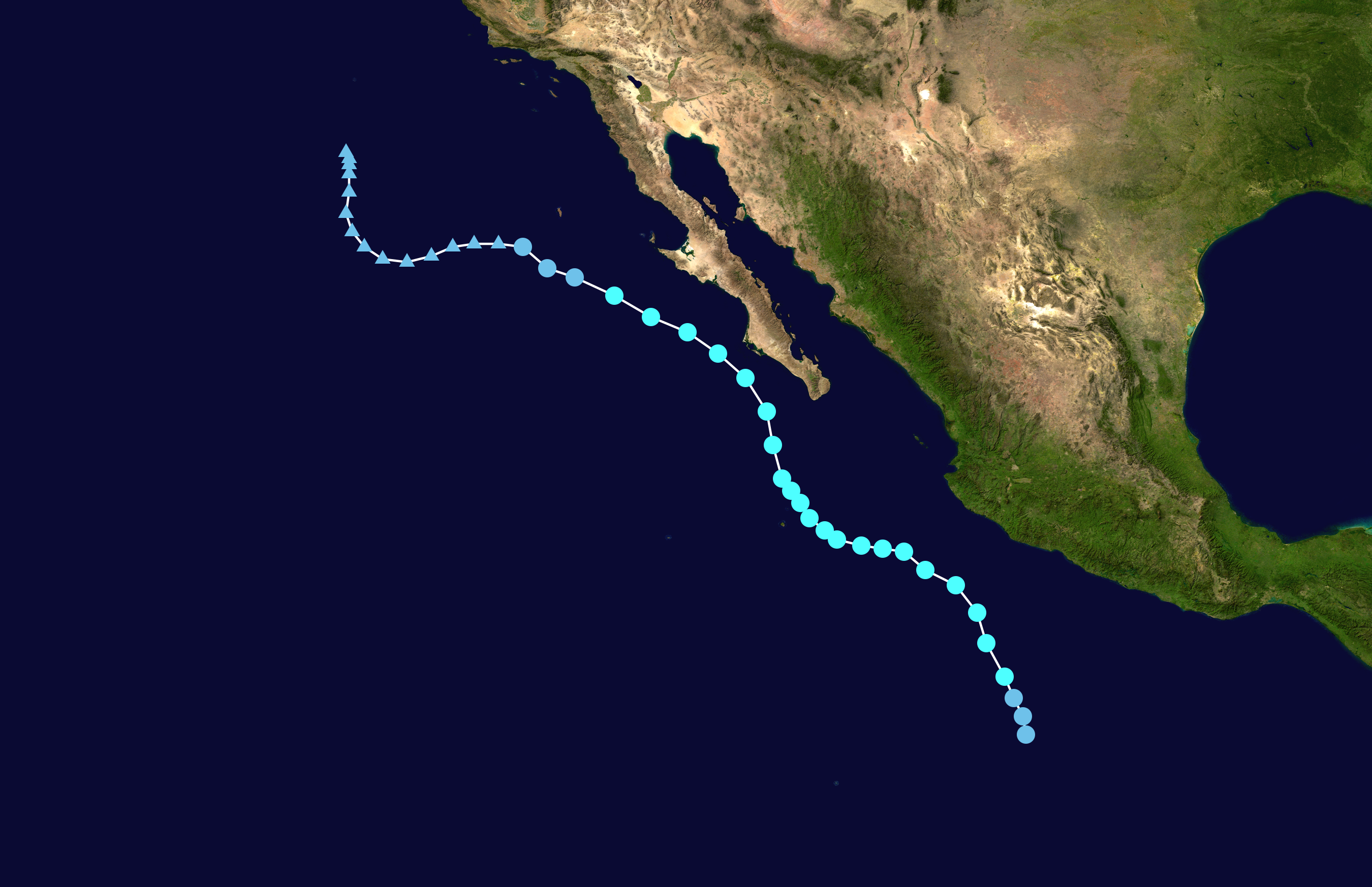
Map plotting the storm's track and intensity, according to the Saffir–Simpson scale Map key Saffir–Simpson scale Tropical depression (≤38 mph, ≤62 km/h) Tropical storm (39–73 mph, 63–118 km/h) Category 1 (74–95 mph, 119–153 km/h) Category 2 (96–110 mph, 154–177 km/h) Category 3 (111–129 mph, 178–208 km/h) Category 4 (130–156 mph, 209–251 km/h) Category 5 (≥157 mph, ≥252 km/h) Unknown Storm type Tropical cyclone Subtropical cyclone Extratropical cyclone, remnant low, tropical disturbance, or monsoon depression

The origins of Emilia can be traced to a tropical wave that crossed northern Central America into the eastern Pacific Ocean on July 16. The system moved westward, developing a well-defined low-pressure area about 525 miles (845 km) southwest of Acapulco by July 19. The next day, its forward motion had shifted to a slow north-northwest track, and with its convection continuing to organize around the low, the National Hurricane Center (NHC) remarked on the potential for tropical cyclogenesis. Early on July 21, its thunderstorm activity organized enough for the NHC to classify it as Tropical Depression Six-E, located to the southwest of Acapulco.

Upon becoming a tropical cyclone, the depression existed in an area of weak steering currents, though a general motion to the north-northwest was influenced by a large subtropical ridge over the southwest United States. The circulation was initially located east of the main convection, due to the presence of wind shear. Convection increased near the center despite the shear, and on July 22 the depression attained tropical storm status about 400 mi (640 km) south of Manzanillo, Colima; it was named Emilia by the NHC. Around the same time, the storm was developing better-defined rainbands, and with favorable conditions expected, Emilia was forecast to attain hurricane status; the NHC noted the potential for rapid deepening as the storm passed near southwestern Mexico.

Early on July 23, the storm briefly became disorganized, with the low-level circulation becoming ill-defined. Around the same time, Emilia passed about 175 mi (282 km) southwest of Manzanillo, which was its closest approach to southwestern Mexico; it is believed to have caused tropical storm force wind gusts along the coastline. Later that day, after turning west-northwestward, the convection increased markedly as an eyewall began to form. Operationally, it was estimated to have reached winds of 70 mph (110 km/h), and it was forecast to continue strengthening to attain Category 2 status on the Saffir–Simpson scale. However, the NHC later re-assessed Emilia as reaching peak winds of 65 mph (105 km/h), since the eye feature was temporary and not well-defined.

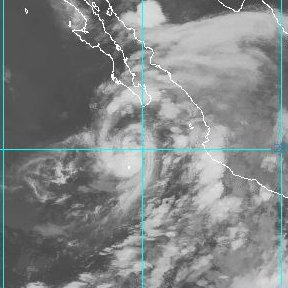
Tropical Storm Emilia passing north of Socorro Island on July 25

Shortly after reaching peak intensity, a sharp increase in wind shear caused Emilia to weaken quickly to winds of 50 mph (80 km/h). Operationally, the NHC initially continued to assess the storm as with winds of 70 mph (115 m/h), with hurricane status predicted. However, the decrease in strength became evident on July 24, when dry air became entrained in the circulation; at the same time, the convection became limited to the southern semicircle of the storm. On July 25, the wind shear decreased as the storm turned toward the Baja California Peninsula, despite that tropical cyclones affecting the Baja California Peninsula in the month of July are rare. Convection increased in coverage, and an eye feature re-appeared early on July 26 as it again attained peak winds of 65 mph (105 km/h).

Emilia maintained peak winds for about 18 hours, during which it passed about 60 mi (97 km) southwest of Cabo San Lázaro, which is a cape located southwest of Ciudad Constitución on the southwestern coast of the Baja California peninsula. After brushing the peninsula with its outer rainbands, Emilia turned away from the coast into cooler waters, and subsequently began to weaken rapidly. On July 27 it deteriorated into a tropical depression, and the next day Emilia degenerated into a convective-less remnant low. The low continued westward until turning northward on July 30, and on July 31 the remnants of Emilia dissipated about 495 mi (797 km) west-southwest of San Diego, California.

== Preparations and impact ==
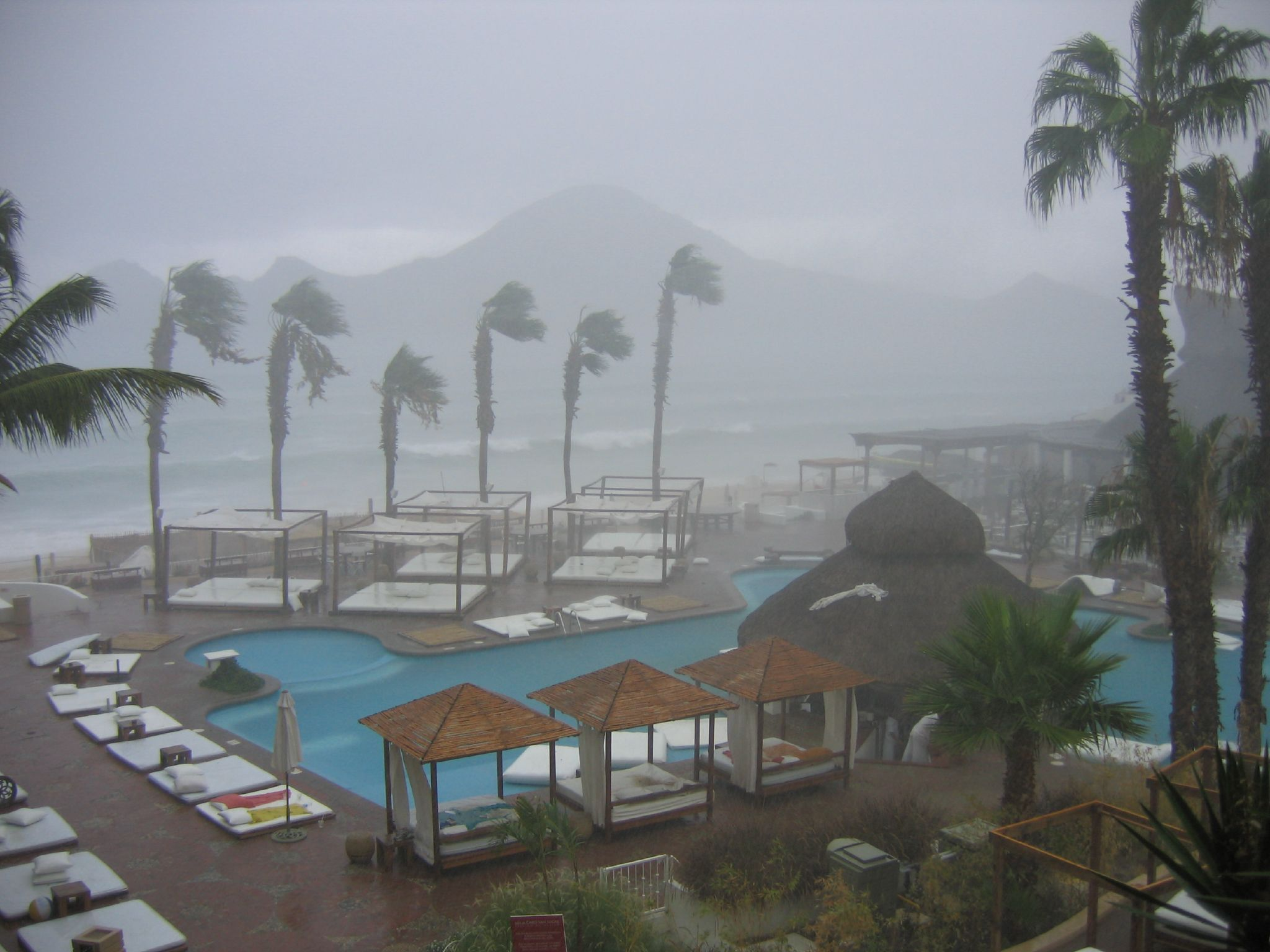
Effects of Emilia in Cabo San Lucas

As Emilia first approached the southwest coast of Mexico, officials issued a tropical storm watch from Manzanillo to Cabo Corrientes, Jalisco; the watch was discontinued 30 hours after it was issued. The storm passed the region on July 22, and is believed to have produced tropical storm force wind gusts along the coastline. A ship recorded 40 mph (64 km/h) winds while Emilia was just off the coast. Further up the coast, in Mazatlán, strong waves from the storm caused beaches to close, while the outer fringes of the storm dropped 4.68 inches (119 mm) of precipitation. Inland, the interaction between Emilia and a tropical wave brought increased moisture and precipitation to southeastern and central Mexico.

When Emilia began turning toward the Baja California Peninsula, the government of Mexico issued a tropical storm watch from Buena Vista along the Gulf of California to Bahía Magdalena along the Pacific coast. The watch was replaced with a tropical storm warning about 12 hours prior to the closest approach of the storm, and additional warnings were issued along the Pacific coastline as the storm passed. All watches and warnings were discontinued by July 27. Officials prepared two schools as emergency shelters in Cabo San Lucas, where 100 people stayed during the storm. In the area, the threat of the storm resulted in the closure of several bars and restaurants.

Across the southern portion of the Baja California peninsula, the storm dropped moderate rainfall, with a total of about 5 inches (130 mm) reported in Cabo San Lucas; the NHC remarked that higher amounts likely occurred in higher elevations. The rainfall caused minor flooding in and around Cabo San Lucas. Along the southern coast of the peninsula, Emilia produced tropical storm force winds; two stations reported sustained winds of 43 mph (69 km/h), with one of those reporting wind gusts to 55 mph (89 km/h). The storm caused minor damage to buildings and utility lines. Waves from the storm left minor damage at several marinas in the region, with several being closed for two days.

The effects of Emilia reached the southwestern United States. In southern Arizona, a surge of moisture from the storm produced scattered thunderstorms, including one severe thunderstorm in Santa Cruz County. The cell dropped heavy rainfall and large hailstones in a short amount of time; one location reported hail of 1.75 inches (44 mm) in diameter. The rainfall, which totaled several inches in some areas, caused flash flooding, with 8 inches (200 mm) of floodwater reported at one location along Interstate 19. Thunderstorms in Graham County produced a wind gust of 64 mph (103 km/h) at the airport in Safford. Unsettled conditions persisted across Arizona for about a week. In southern California, the storm dropped light rainfall, which assisted firefighters in containing a wildfire.

== See also ==
- List of Baja California Peninsula hurricanes
- Other tropical cyclones named Emilia
- Timeline of the 2006 Pacific hurricane season
- List of storms in the 2006 Pacific hurricane season
