= List of storms named Emilia =

The name Emilia has been used for nine tropical cyclones in the East Pacific Ocean and one European windstorm.

In the East Pacific:

- Tropical Storm Emilia (1978) – never affected land.
- Tropical Storm Emilia (1982) – never affected land.
- Tropical Storm Emilia (1988) – never affected land.
- Hurricane Emilia (1994) – Category 5 hurricane, threatened Hawaii but turned away without affecting land.
- Tropical Storm Emilia (2000) – never affected land.
- Tropical Storm Emilia (2006) – came near Baja California but turned away.
- Hurricane Emilia (2012) – strongest storm of the season, churned in the open ocean.
- Tropical Storm Emilia (2018) – never affected land.
- Tropical Storm Emilia (2024) – never affected land.

In Europe:

- Storm Emilia (2025) – caused 37 fatalities in Safi, Morocco.

== See also ==
- Tropical Storm Emilie (1977) – a South-West Indian Ocean tropical cyclone with a similar name.
