= List of storms named Lane =

The name Lane has been used for nine tropical cyclones in the Eastern Pacific Ocean.

- Tropical Storm Lane (1978) – crossed into the Central Pacific without affecting land
- Tropical Storm Lane (1982) – stayed in the open ocean
- Hurricane Lane (1988) – a Category 2 hurricane that moved parallel to Mexico
- Hurricane Lane (1994) – a Category 4 hurricane that moved out into the open ocean
- Hurricane Lane (2000) – a Category 2 hurricane that made a loop off the coast of Mexico, and passed directly over Socorro Island
- Hurricane Lane (2006) – a strong Category 3 hurricane that made landfall in the Mexican state of Sinaloa
- Hurricane Lane (2012) – a short-lived Category 1 hurricane that remained far from land
- Hurricane Lane (2018) – a powerful Category 5 hurricane that weakened as it approached and passed south of Hawaii
- Tropical Storm Lane (2024) – weak storm that remained far from land
