= Hurricane Lane (2006) =

Category 3 Pacific hurricane in 2006

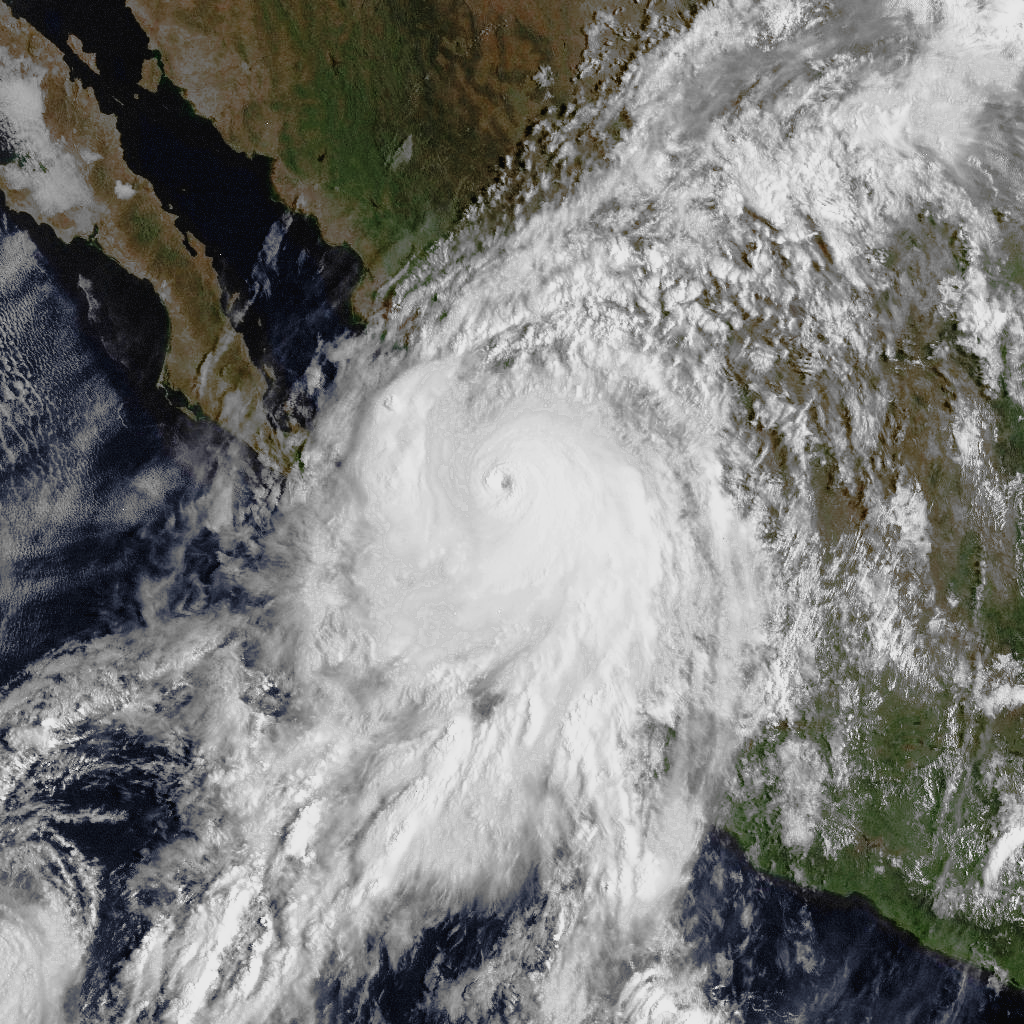
- Hurricane Lane at peak intensity as a Category 3 hurricane, on September 16

Meteorological history
- Formed: September 13, 2006
- Dissipated: September 17, 2006

Category 3 major hurricane
- 1-minute sustained (SSHWS/NWS)
- Highest winds: 125 mph (205 km/h)
- Lowest pressure: 952 mbar (hPa); 28.11 inHg

Overall effects
- Fatalities: 4 direct
- Damage: $203 million (2006 USD)
- Areas affected: Western Mexico, Southwestern United States
- IBTrACS
- Part of the 2006 Pacific hurricane season

Hurricane Lane was a powerful tropical cyclone which is tied as the ninth-strongest Pacific hurricane to make landfall on record. The thirteenth named storm, ninth hurricane, and sixth major hurricane of the 2006 Pacific hurricane season, Lane developed on September 13 from a tropical wave to the south of Mexico. It moved northwestward, parallel to the coast of Mexico, and steadily intensified in an area conducive to further strengthening. After turning to the northeast, Lane attained peak winds of 125 mph (201 km/h), and made landfall in the state of Sinaloa at peak strength. It rapidly weakened and dissipated on September 17, and later brought precipitation to southern part of the U.S. state of Texas.

Throughout its path, Lane resulted in four deaths and moderate damage. Damage was heaviest in Sinaloa, where the hurricane made landfall, including reports of severe crop damage. Across Mexico, an estimated 4,320 homes were affected by the hurricane, with about 248,000 people affected. Moderate flooding was reported in Acapulco, resulting in mudslides in some areas. Damage across the country totaled $2.2 billion (2006 MXN), or $206 million (2006 USD, or $218 million in 2010 USD).

== Meteorological history ==
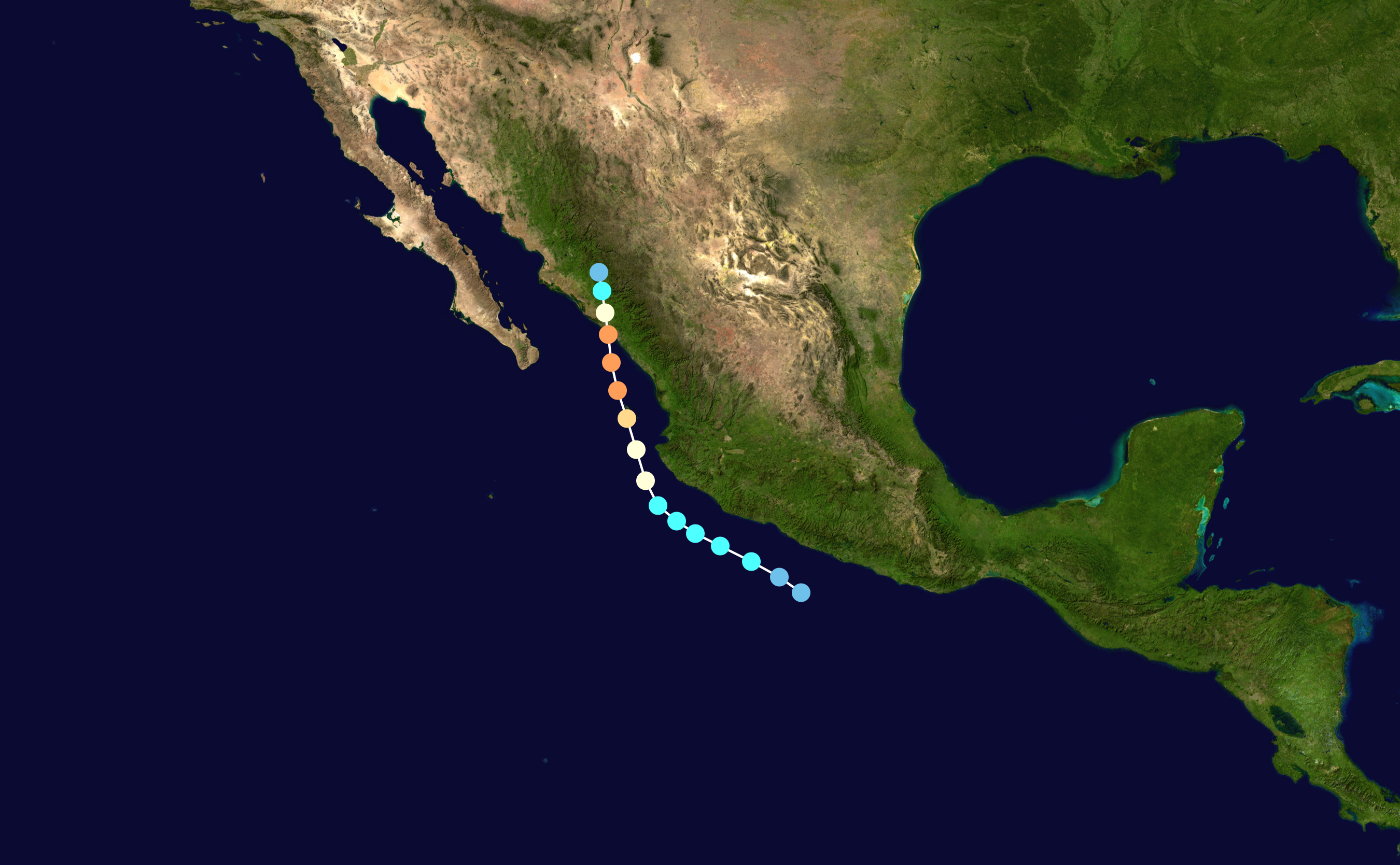
Map plotting the storm's track and intensity, according to the Saffir–Simpson scale Map key Saffir–Simpson scale Tropical depression (≤38 mph, ≤62 km/h) Tropical storm (39–73 mph, 63–118 km/h) Category 1 (74–95 mph, 119–153 km/h) Category 2 (96–110 mph, 154–177 km/h) Category 3 (111–129 mph, 178–208 km/h) Category 4 (130–156 mph, 209–251 km/h) Category 5 (≥157 mph, ≥252 km/h) Unknown Storm type Tropical cyclone Subtropical cyclone Extratropical cyclone, remnant low, tropical disturbance, or monsoon depression

A tropical wave moved off the coast of Africa on August 31, 2006. It moved westward without development, and entered the eastern Pacific Ocean on September 10. An area of convection developed along the wave axis, several hundred miles south of the Gulf of Tehuantepec. It moved slowly westward and steadily organized. Convection and banding features organized around a developing center, and the system developed into Tropical Depression Thirteen-E on September 13. The system continued to organize and strengthened into Tropical Storm Lane early on September 14 about 90 miles (140 km) off the coast of Mexico. Based on a potentially developing anticyclone over the storm and a track over warm water temperatures, the Statistical Hurricane Intensity Prediction Scheme model issued a 46 percent probability for rapid intensification of the storm.

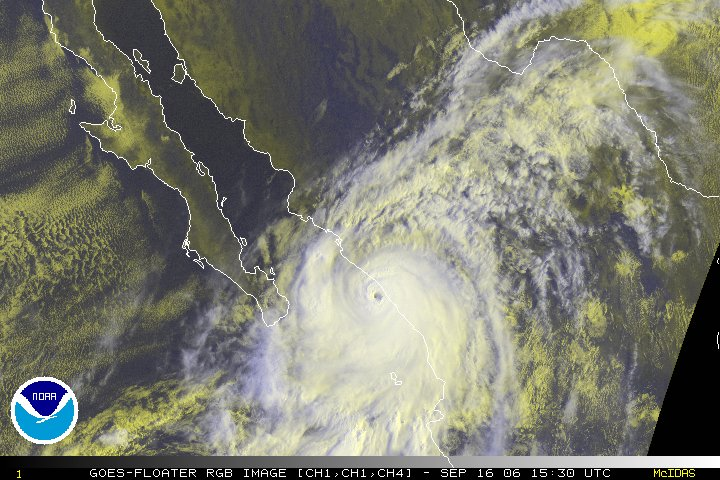
Hurricane Lane at peak intensity shortly before landfall

Lane continued to become better organized, with deep convection developing into a central dense overcast and well-defined outflow in the western half of the storm. Late on September 14, an eyewall began to develop a short distance off the Mexican coastline. Lane continued to strengthen as it turned more to the north-northwest, a motion caused due to the storm moving around the western periphery of a mid-level ridge over Mexico. Based on reports from Reconnaissance Aircraft, Lane was upgraded to hurricane status on September 15, about 40 miles (64 km) west-northwest of Cabo Corrientes, Jalisco. Subsequently, it quickly strengthened, and by six hours afterward, it attained winds of 105 mph (169 km/h), becoming a Category 2 hurricane on the Saffir–Simpson scale. Later that day, the 10 miles (16 km) wide eye crossed over the Islas Marías. Early on September 16, Lane strengthened into a 115 mph (185 km/h) hurricane, just 50 miles (80 km) off the coast of Mexico, becoming the sixth major hurricane of the season.

Hurricane Lane continued to organize with its 9-mile (14 km) wide eye, surrounded by very deep convection, and the storm strengthened further to reach peak winds of 125 mph (201 km/h) by midday on September 16. It turned unexpectedly to the northeast, and at 1915 UTC on the September 16, Hurricane Lane made landfall in a sparsely populated region of Sinaloa, 20 miles (32 km) southeast of El Dorado. This made Lane the most intense hurricane to strike Mexico since Hurricane Kenna in the 2002 season. The combination of the mountainous terrain of Mexico and increasing west-southwesterly wind shear caused the storm to rapidly weaken, and the storm dissipated on September 17. The remnants of Lane later moved into Texas, United States.

== Preparations ==
Due to Lane's projected path near the western coast of Mexico, authorities closed ports to small boats in the cities of Acapulco. Just weeks after Hurricane John took a similar path through the area, several tourists voluntarily left their vacations to fly home. Many residents boarded up buildings and bought hurricane supplies in preparation for the storm. Officials also closed schools across the state of Guerrero. In all, 40,400 tourists were evacuated from the Mexican coastline. According to the Secretaría de Gobernación, under which the Mexican Civil Protection Service operates, there were 5.5 million homes and 21 million people in 21 states threatened by the system in all of Mexico. As a result, authorities evacuated about 2,000 people to emergency shelters.

As Lane came closer to the coastline, all the seaports between Michoacán and Sinaloa were closed, and the Servicio Meteorológico Nacional (Mexico) (National Meteorological Service, in Spanish) warned the general population about the threat of flooding and landslides. When the hurricane made landfall, the government of the state of Sinaloa issued a state of emergency for the municipalities of Ahome, Guasave, Angostura, Salvador Alvarado, Culiacán, Navolato, Elota, San Ignacio and Mazatlán. The arrival of the hurricane forced the closure of several flights at the Mazatlán International Airport in Mazatlán, Sinaloa.

Prior to entering the area, the U.S. National Weather Service issued a Flood Watch for large portions of Texas due to the remnants of Lane.

== Impact ==
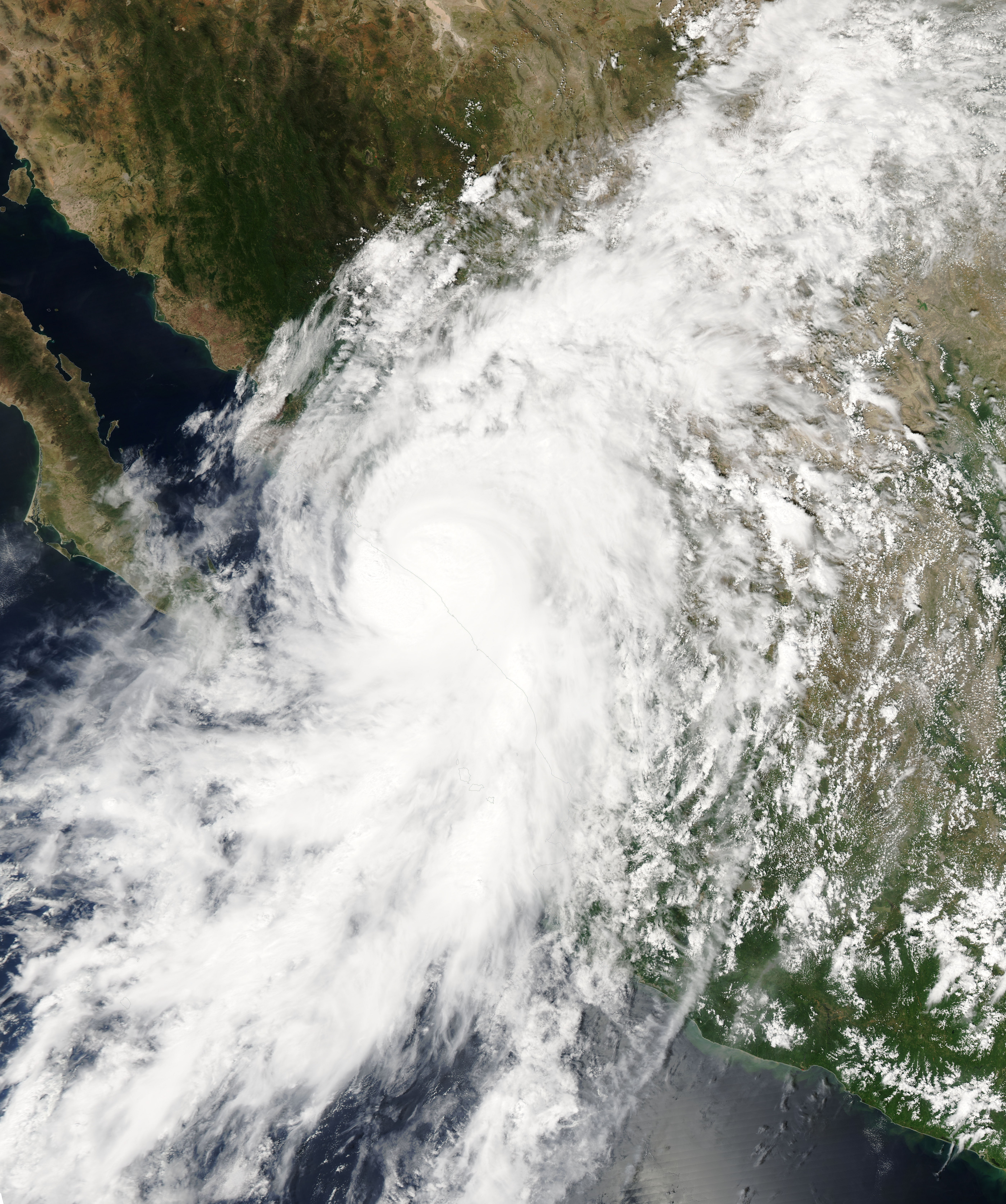
Lane making landfall in Sinaloa

In Acapulco, the storm produced strong waves and heavy rain, leaving coastal streets with up to 16 inches (410 mm) of water. The heavy rainfall flooded 200 houses and caused a mudslide, resulting in the death of a seven-year-old boy. Flooding also occurred at the airport in Acapulco, though service was not interrupted. Offshore, strong waves capsized a boat, leaving one person missing. Heavy rainfall in the port of Lázaro Cárdenas, Michoacán, overflowed a canal, forcing over 500 people to evacuate their homes. 500 acres (2.0 km^{2}) of crops were destroyed by Lane in Michoacán. Road and airport damage in Colima totaled to about $30 million (2006 MXN, $2.7 million 2006 USD). In Cajón de Peña, Jalisco, rainfall totaled to 7.36 inches (187 mm). One man died in Pueblos Unidos after being knocked over by strong winds. Throughout Jalisco, 109 people had to evacuate their homes due to landslides and heavy rainfall.

In El Dorado, Sinaloa, near where the storm made landfall, the hurricane washed out away roads and destroyed many flimsy homes. Strong winds knocked down electricity towers, trees, and traffic signs, leaving many without power. In Mazatlán, to the southeast of where Lane moved ashore, the hurricane produced strong winds and heavy rains, causing street flooding and power outages. The threat of the hurricane forced the cancellation of an Independence Day Parade. Between Mazatlán and the state capital, Culiacán, the hurricane destroyed a bridge, leaving dozens of trucks stranded. In Culiacán, one person died when he drove his car into a river, while several streets were flooded from the storm. Throughout Sinaloa, several damaged roads left many communities cut off from the rest of the country. Lane caused severe agricultural damage in the state, possibly reaching as high as $600 million (2006 MXN, $55 million 2006 USD). The hurricane also damaged water treatment facilities and distribution systems in multiple communities, prompting the Secretariat of Health to declare a sanitary alert in Sinaloa. Damage in Sinaloa totaled to around $1.2 billion (2006 MXN), $109.3 million (2006 USD).

Throughout Mexico, Hurricane Lane killed four people. An estimated 4,320 homes were affected by the hurricane, with about 248,000 people affected. Water systems were damaged in nine municipalities, leaving thousands temporarily without water. A total of 19,200 miles (30,900 km) of roads and highways were damaged to some degree, including some destroyed bridges. In all, the hurricane caused about $2.2 billion (2006 MXN, $203 million 2006 USD) in damage in the country. In the United States, the remnants of Lane brought precipitation to southern Texas.

== Aftermath ==
By the day after Hurricane Lane made landfall, most of the evacuated people returned to their homes to begin the cleanup process. Some tourists who remained in the area for the storm continued their vacations, while others tried to leave the area. The federal government declared a state of emergency for nine municipalities in Sinaloa, allowing emergency funds to give relief support to the affected population. Helicopters were used to distribute foods and locate cut-off residents. The government set up three temporary shelters in Mazatlán for 360 people and three shelters in Culiacán for about 1,000 affected residents. To prevent the spread of Dengue fever, officials sent epidemiologists to 67 communities, with 18 mobile units and 15 Nebulizer units. By a month after the storm, all roads and highways affected by the hurricane were open for transportation.

== See also ==
- Other tropical cyclones named Lane
- Timeline of the 2006 Pacific hurricane season
