= List of storms named Paul =

The name Paul has been used for twelve tropical cyclones worldwide.

In the Eastern Pacific:

- Tropical Storm Paul (1978) – made landfall in western Mexico.
- Hurricane Paul (1982) – killed over 1,000 in Central America.
- Tropical Storm Paul (1994) – never threatened land.
- Tropical Storm Paul (2000) – weak storm that stayed out to sea; remnants brought significant flooding to Hawaii.
- Hurricane Paul (2006) – made landfall in Mexico as a tropical depression.
- Hurricane Paul (2012) – threatened Baja California, but weakened before landfall.
- Tropical Storm Paul (2018) – never threatened land.

In the Western Pacific:

- Tropical Storm Paul (1999) (T9908, 12W)

In the Southern Hemisphere:

- Cyclone Paul (1980)
- Cyclone Paul (2000)
- Cyclone Paul (2010)
- Cyclone Paul (2024)
